= Hala Gąsienicowa =

Pasture and valley area in the Tatra Mountains, Poland

Coordinates: 49°14′37″N 20°00′24″E

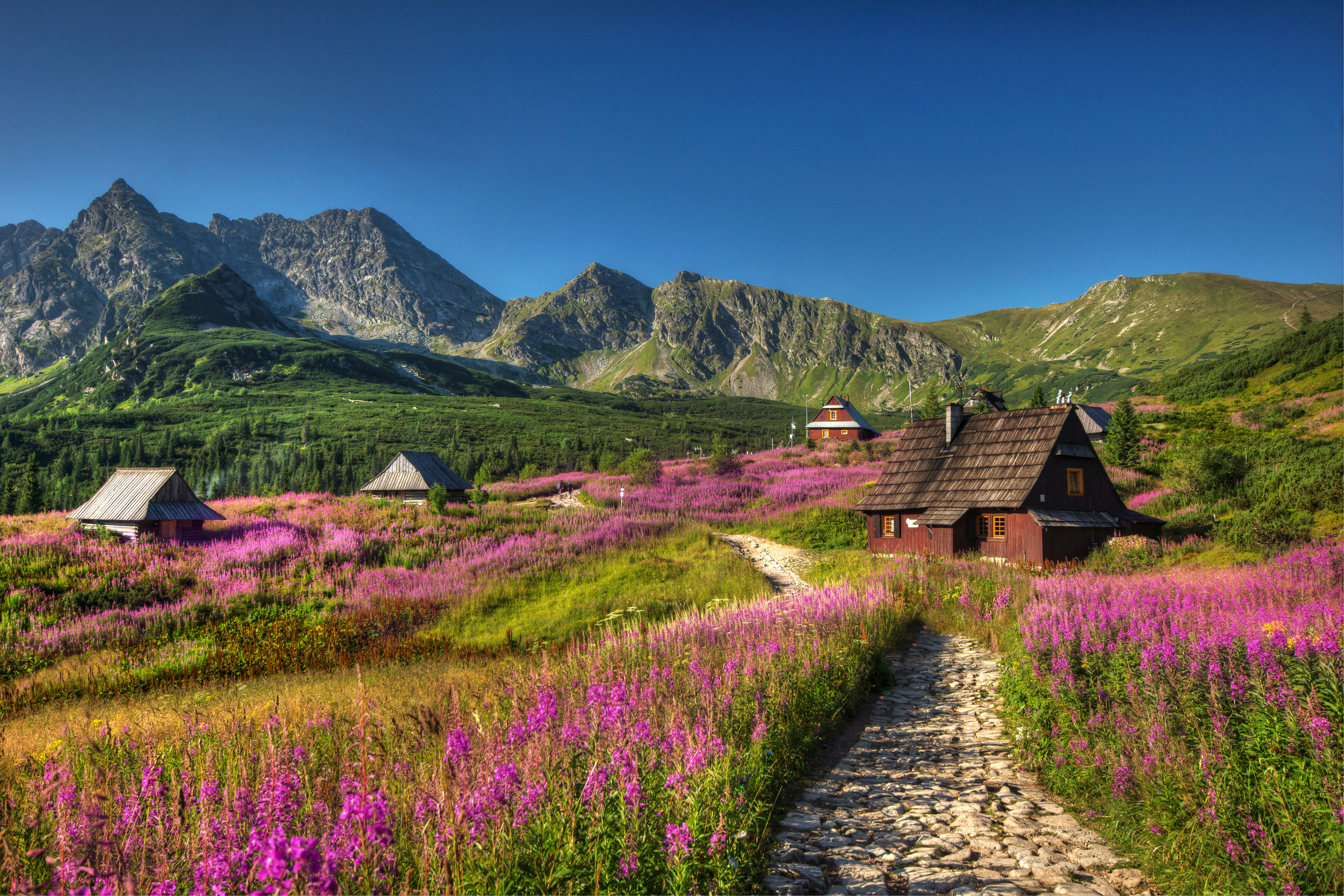
View from the blue hiking trail through Rówienki

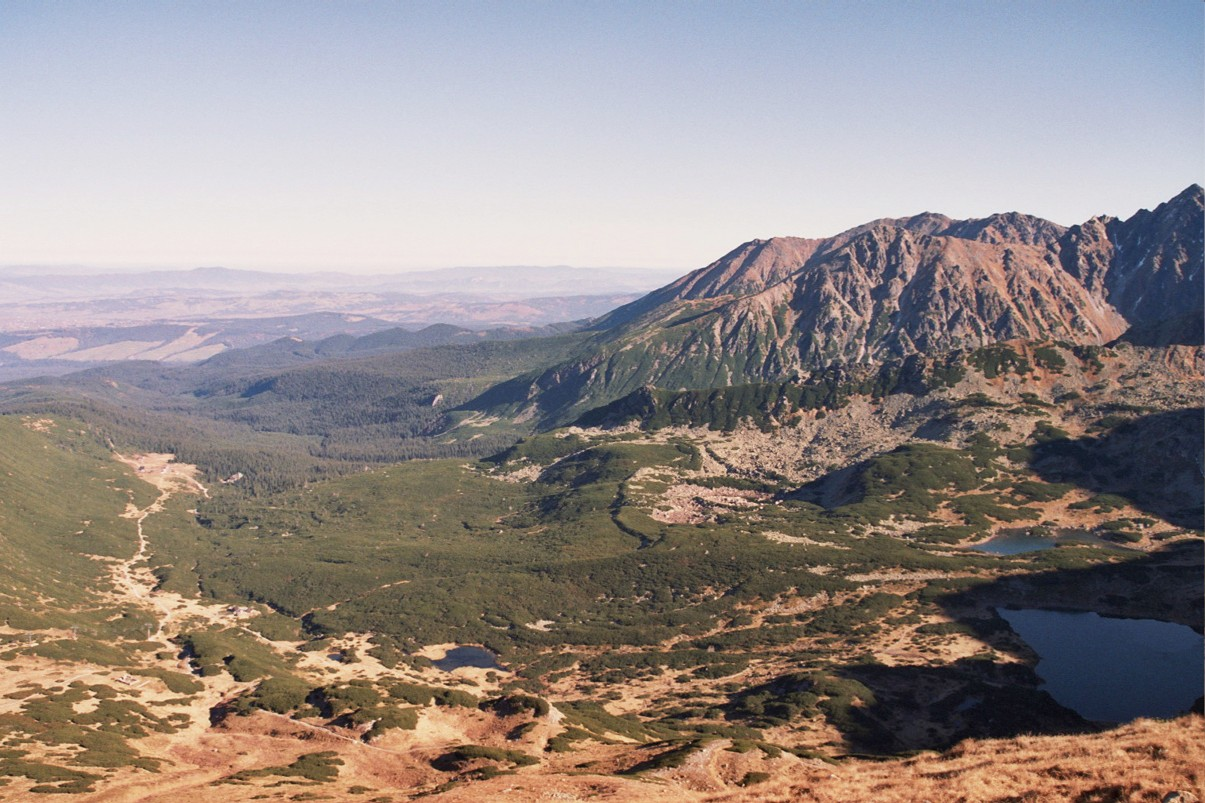
View of Hala Gąsienicowa from near Kasprowy Wierch

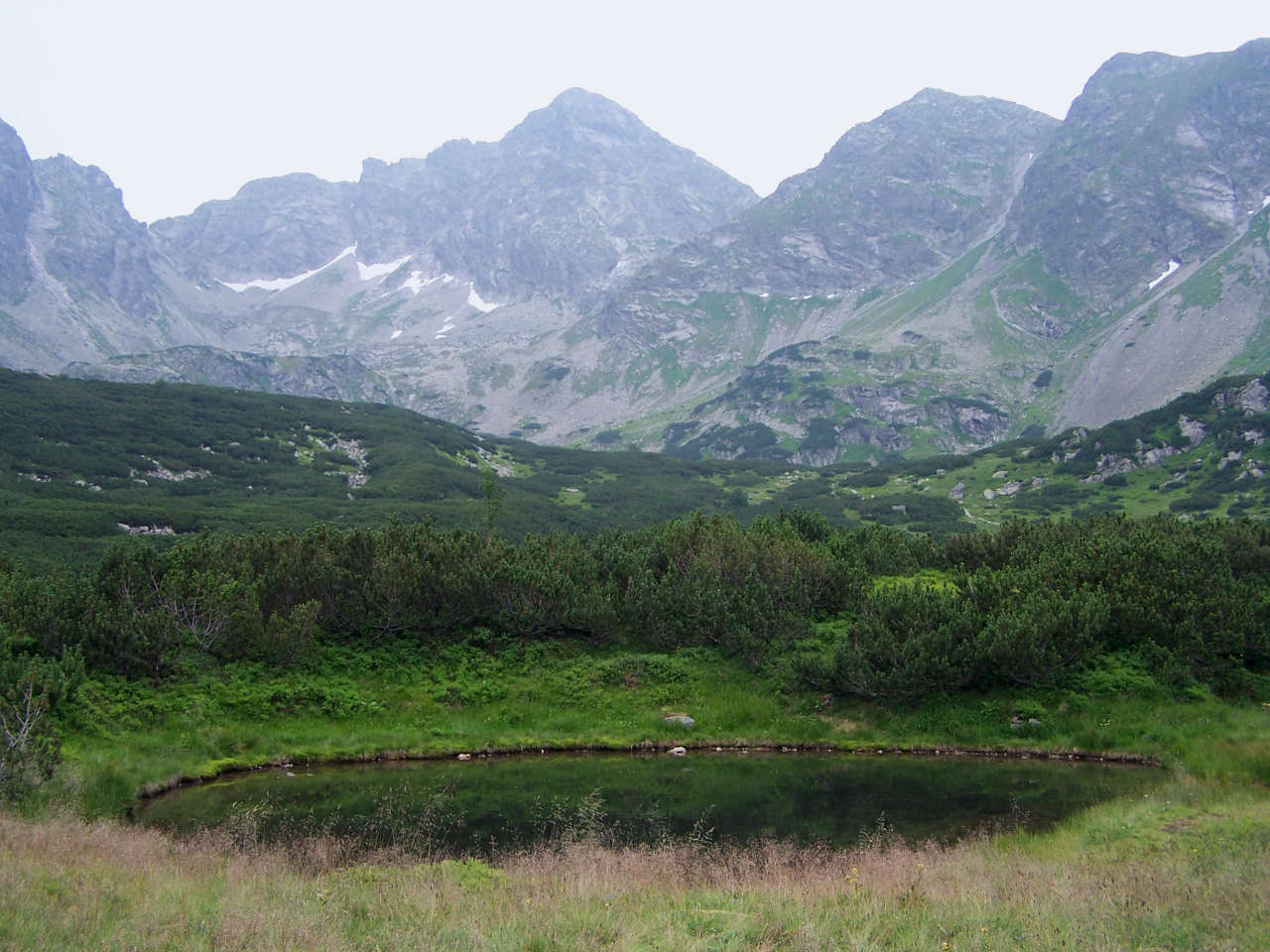
Zielona Gąsienicowa Valley

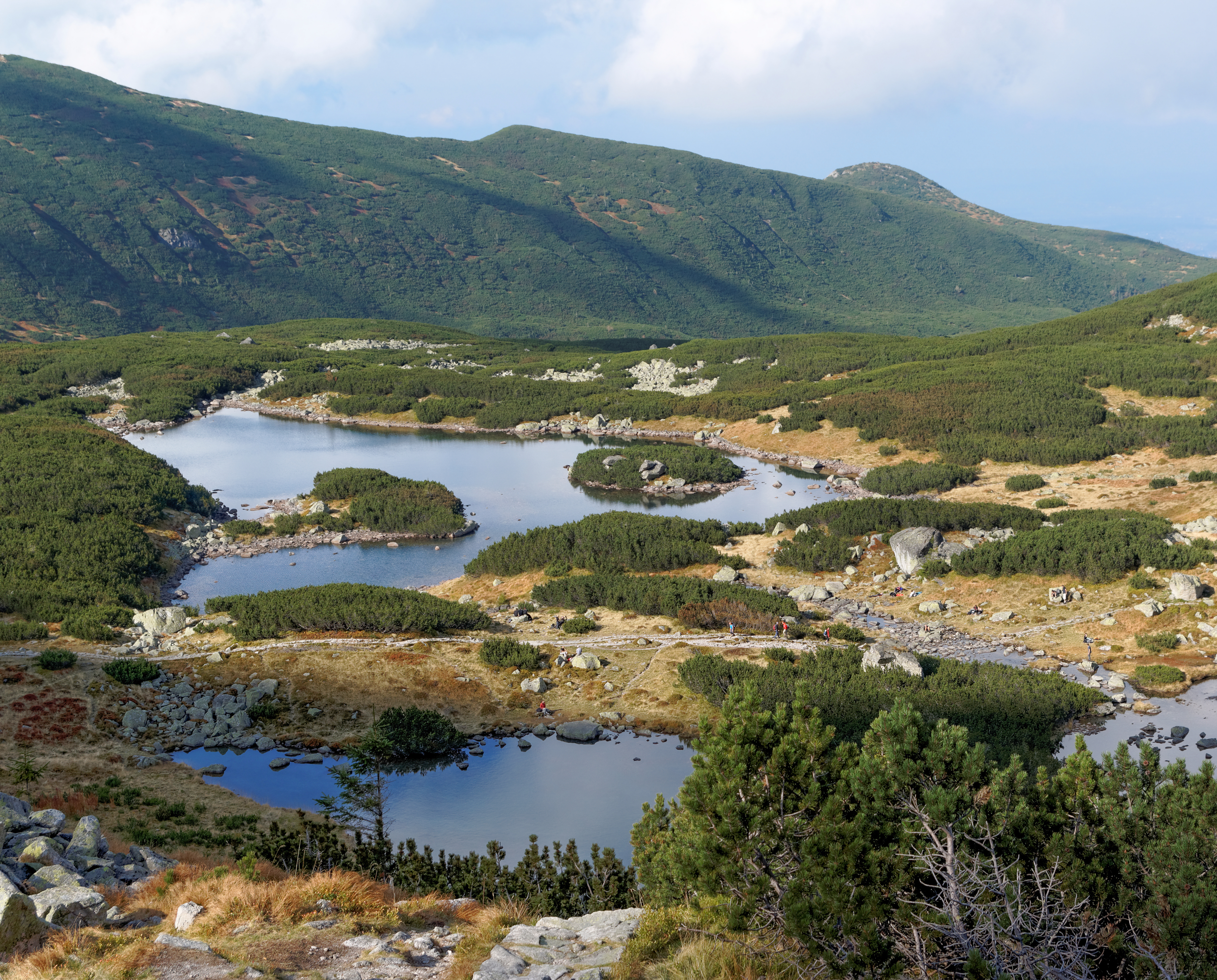
Kurtkowiec Lake and Czerwone Stawki Gąsienicowe

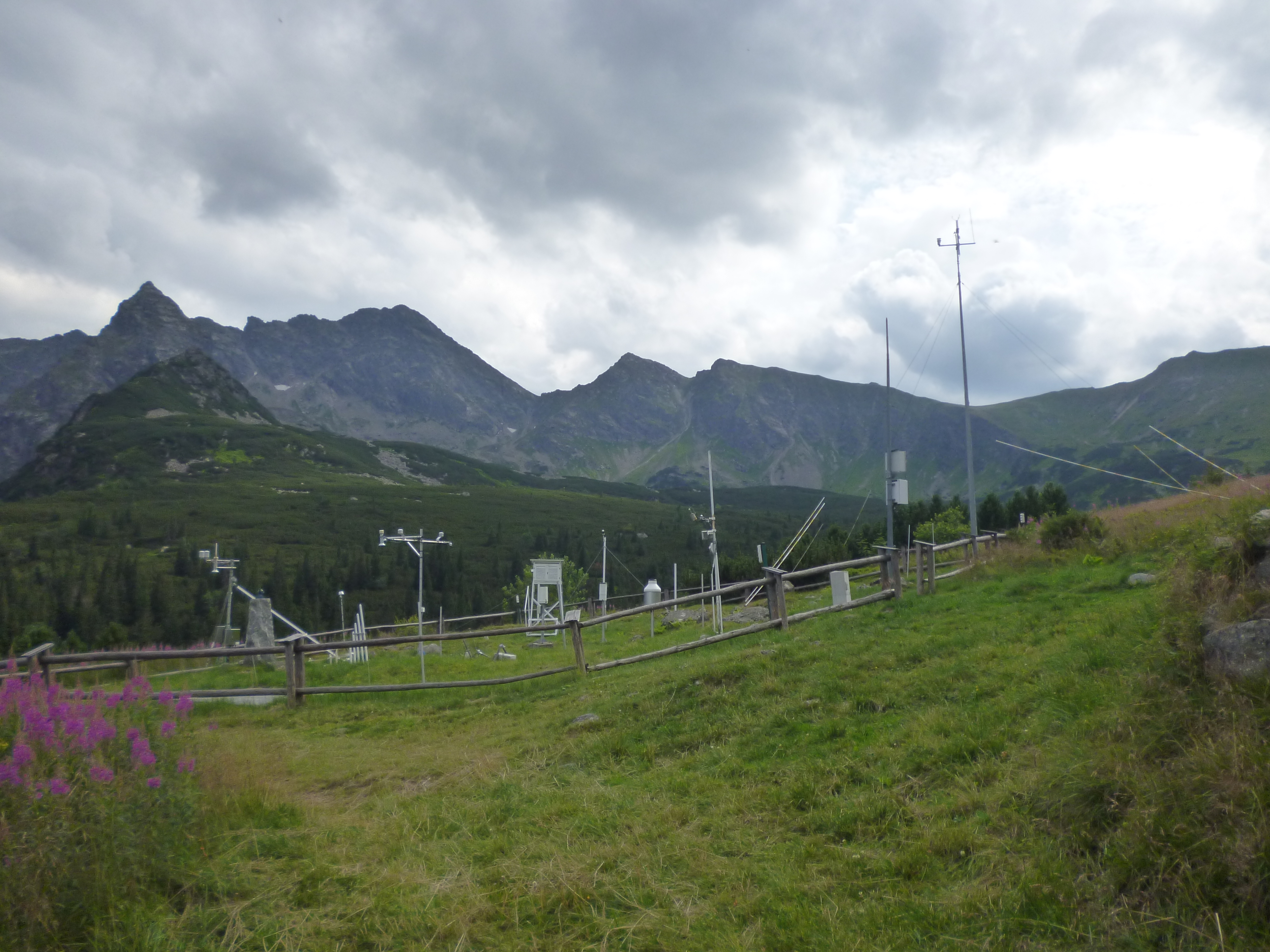
Observation Station of the Institute of Geography and Spatial Organization at Hala Gąsienicowa

Hala Gąsienicowa refers to the northern part of Gąsienicowa Valley in the Tatra Mountains, encompassing Rówienki and the area around the Murowaniec mountain hut. It is accessible from Kuźnice via two trails: a blue trail through Boczań and Skupniów Upłaz or a yellow trail through Jaworzynka Valley. Both trails meet at Przełęcz między Kopami and take approximately the same time. From there, the route continues through Królowa Rówień and Rówienki, totaling just over two hours.

== Naming ==
The name derives from the prominent Gąsienica family, common in Zakopane and nearby areas, who owned the pasture in the 17th century. Originally, the name applied only to the pasture and was not its first designation. Locals called it the Pasture of the Ponds, and those grazing there were known as stawiany. In early 19th-century documents, particularly Austrian ones, it was referred to as the Valley of Seven Ponds or, less commonly, the Valley of Five Ponds. Zofia Hołub-Pacewiczowa noted, "The name Hala Gąsienicowa in its current form became established only in recent times". The name later extended to the valley and various features within it.

== Description ==
The pasture hosts the large and popular Murowaniec mountain hut, along with several other structures, including shepherd huts, a forester's lodge, the Tatra National Park's Gawra ranger station, the Observation Station of the Institute of Geography and Spatial Organization, and the climbers' base, Betlejemka. Warning signs for bears are present in the area. During peak season, when the mountain hut is full, alternative lodging may be available at the meteorological station, climbers' base, or forester's lodge.

Hala Gąsienicowa serves as a base for hikes to Kościelec, Zawrat, Granaty, Świnica, Kozi Wierch, and Kasprowy Wierch. Except for the trail to Kasprowy Wierch, these routes are challenging. A beginner-friendly trail leads to Czarny Staw Gąsienicowy, from where more difficult paths to Zawrat and Kościelec via the Karb Pass begin.

A yellow trail branches left from the Murowaniec mountain hut to Krzyżne pass through Pańszczyca Valley. This trail is relatively easy, with one challenging section near a rocky outcrop on the steep ascent to Krzyżne. Above the mountain hut lies a weather station, the first high-mountain weather station in Polish territory, operating from 1 December 1913 to 1917 as a measurement station for the Natural Sciences Section of the Polish Tatra Society. It is now the Maria and Mieczysław Kłapa Research Station of the Institute of Geography and Spatial Organization of the Polish Academy of Sciences.

In 1926, Stanisław Pardyak died here.

== Pastoral history ==
Historically, Hala Gąsienicowa was a major pastoral center in the Tatra Mountains. Its grassy areas are not natural but were created by shepherds clearing vast tracts of dwarf pine. After grazing ceased, the pasture has been gradually reclaimed by dwarf pine. The pasture spanned 797.45 hectares, with only 3.8 hectares used as pastures, 521.2 hectares as wastelands, 105 hectares as dwarf pine, and 47.45 hectares as forest. It encompassed Czarna Gąsienicowa Valley and Zielona Gąsienicowa Valley, and even the upper, forested part of Suchej Wody Gąsienicowej Valley. The Rówienki terrace was divided between two pastures: the smaller southern part belonged to Hala Gąsienicowa, while the larger northern part belonged to Hala Królowa. Shepherd huts and sheds once stood here.

This high-mountain pasture, strewn with large boulders and dwarf pine, is surrounded by towering rock massifs and numerous ponds. It was a vibrant pastoral hub, visited by bandits, and, according to legend, a recruitment site for Aleksander Kostka Napierski's uprising.

In 1700, the Gąsienica family traded Hala Gąsienicowa to the Szaflarski family from Czarny Dunajec for Hala Kryta in Chochołowska Valley, but a 1796 court ruling restored the original ownership. Later, through inheritance, the pasture was divided among numerous owners from nearby villages, including Ząb, Olcza, Gliczarów Dolny, Nowe Bystre, Biały Dunajec, and Szaflary. In 1960, grazing was equivalent to 494 sheep. When the State Treasury purchased the pasture in 1961, it had 381 owners.

== Hiking trails ==
The Murowaniec mountain hut is a major hub for marked hiking trails:

- Blue trail from Kuźnice through Boczań and Skupniów Upłaz to Murowaniec, continuing to Czarny Staw Gąsienicowy and Zawrat.
  - Time from Kuźnice to Murowaniec: 2 h, ↓ 1 h 35 min
  - Time from Murowaniec to Zawrat: 2 h 20 min, ↓ 1 h 50 min
- Black trail to Brzeziny via Psia Trawka. Time: 1 h 45 min, ↑ 2 h 15 min
- Green trail to Wierchporoniec via Rówień Waksmundzka, Gęsia Szyja, and Rusinowa Polana. Time: 3 h 50 min, ↓ 4 h 15 min
- Yellow trail from Kasprowy Wierch via Gienkowe Mury and Roztoka Stawiańska to Murowaniec, then through Pańszczyca Valley to Krzyżne pass.
  - Time from Kasprowy Wierch to Murowaniec: 1 h 5 min, ↑ 1 h 25 min
  - Time from Murowaniec to Krzyżne: 2 h 45 min, ↓ 2 h 5 min
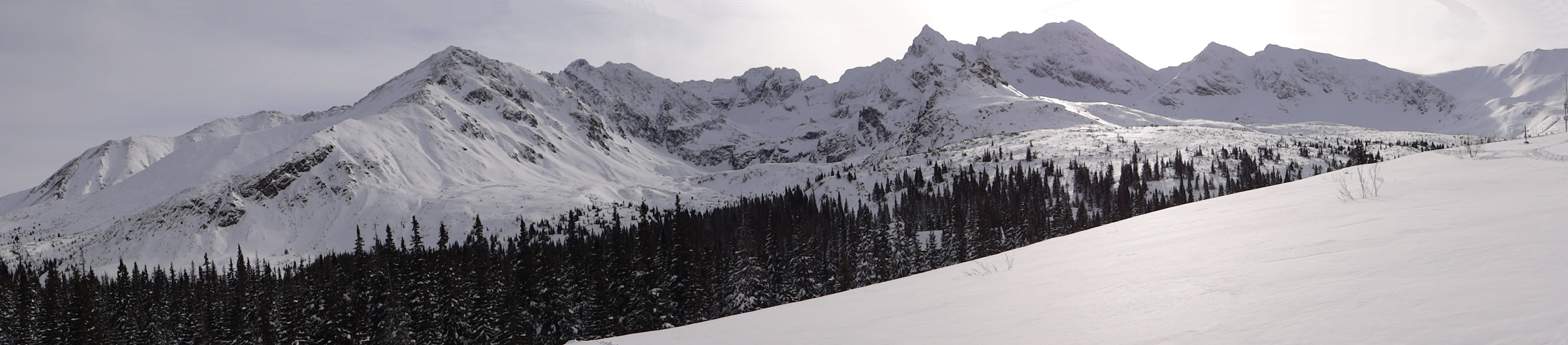
Panorama of the Tatra Mountains from Hala Gąsienicowa
