= Tatra pastures =

Pastoral and economic land units in the Tatra Mountains

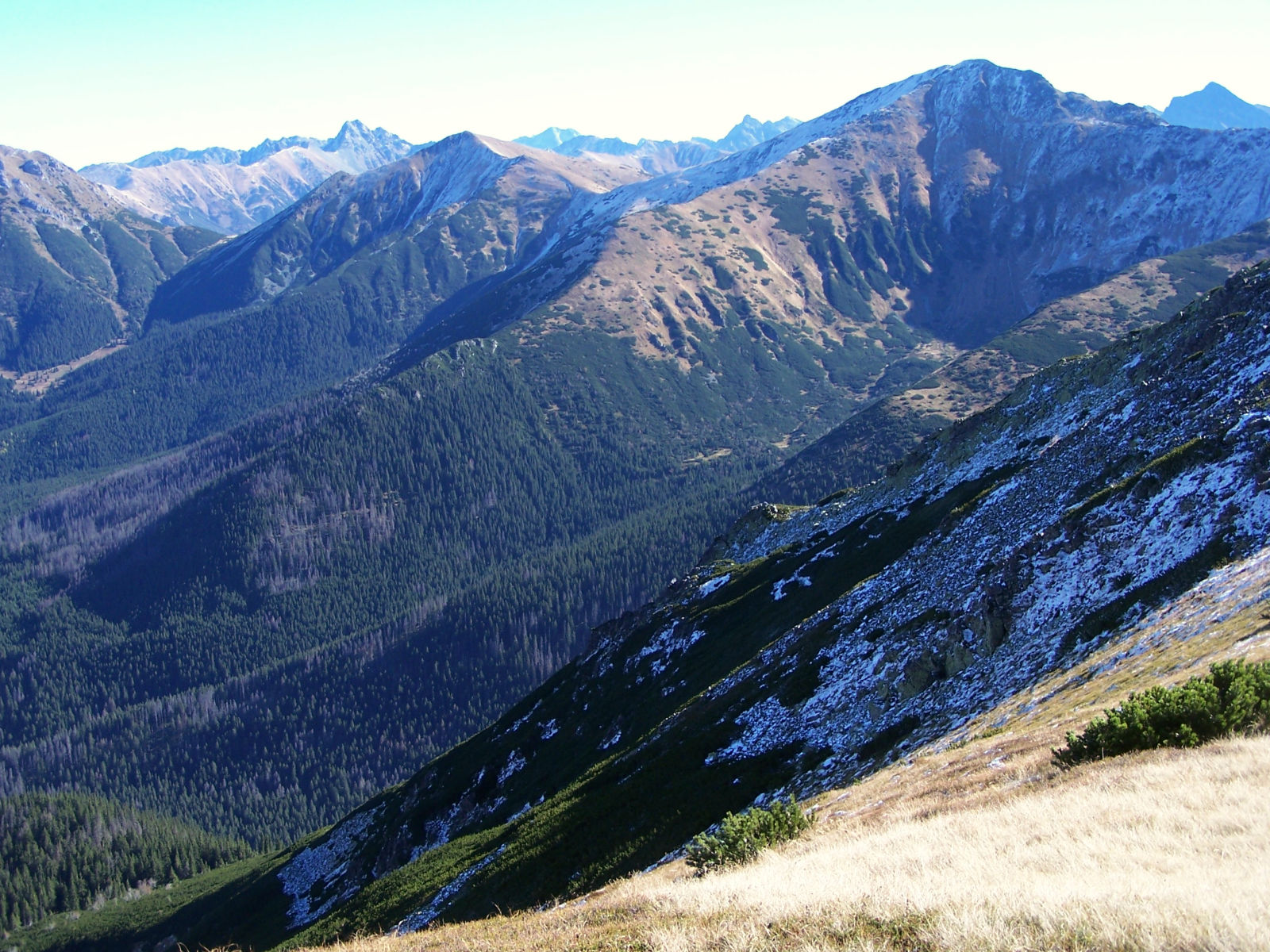
Former areas of Hala Tomanowa and Hala Smreczyny

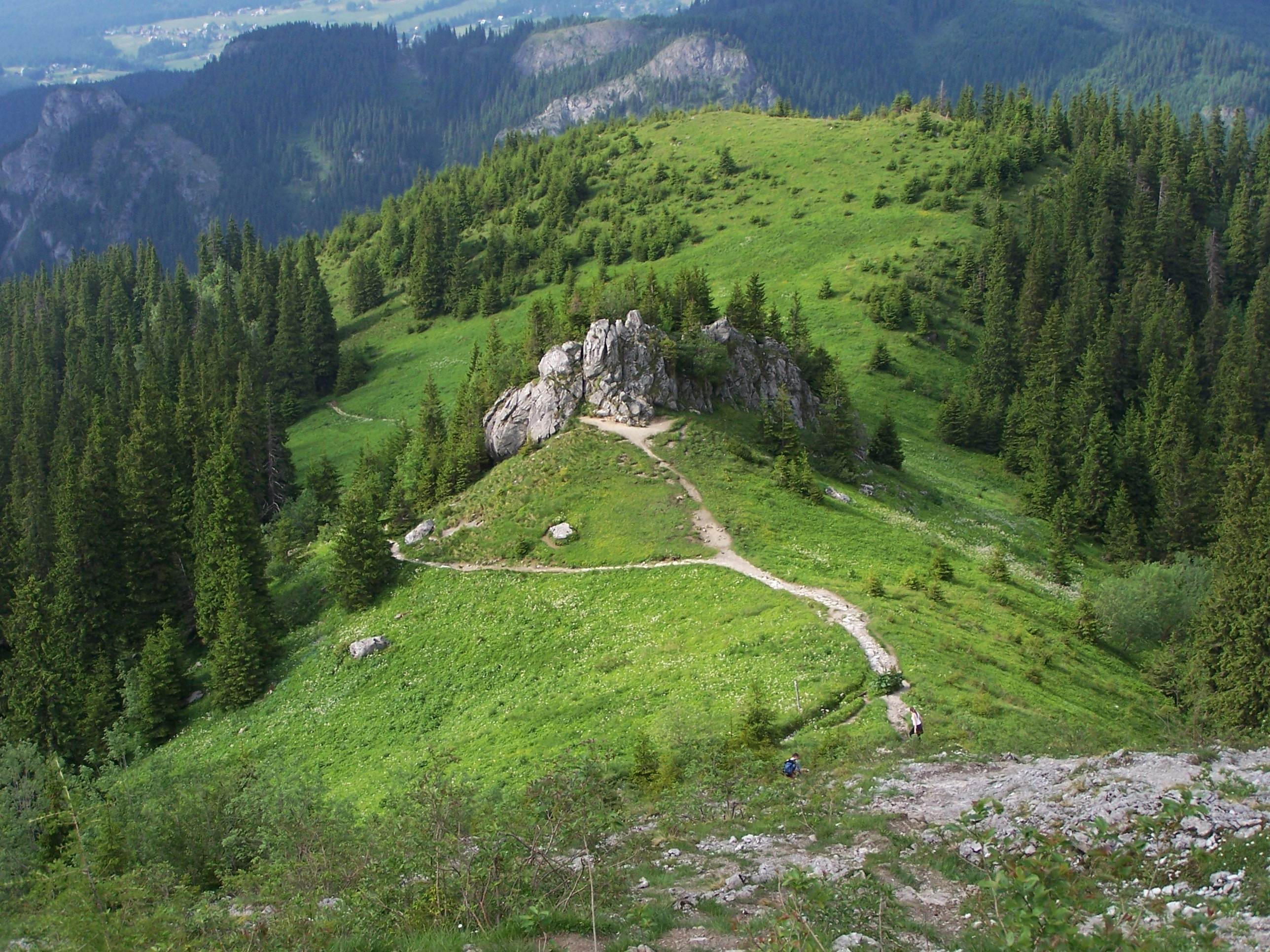
Part of Hala Upłaz near Piec rock

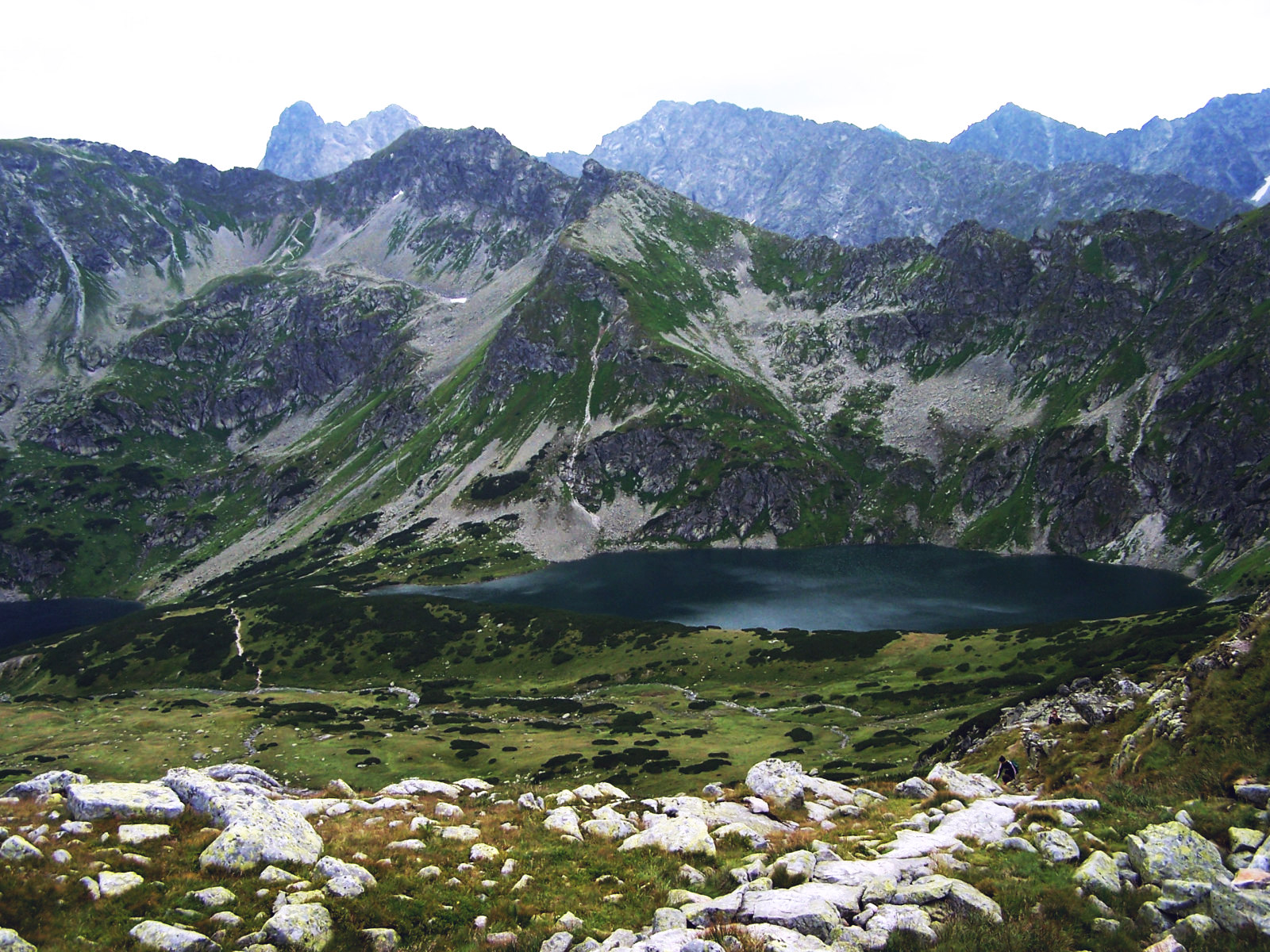
High-altitude pasture in Five Polish Lakes Valley

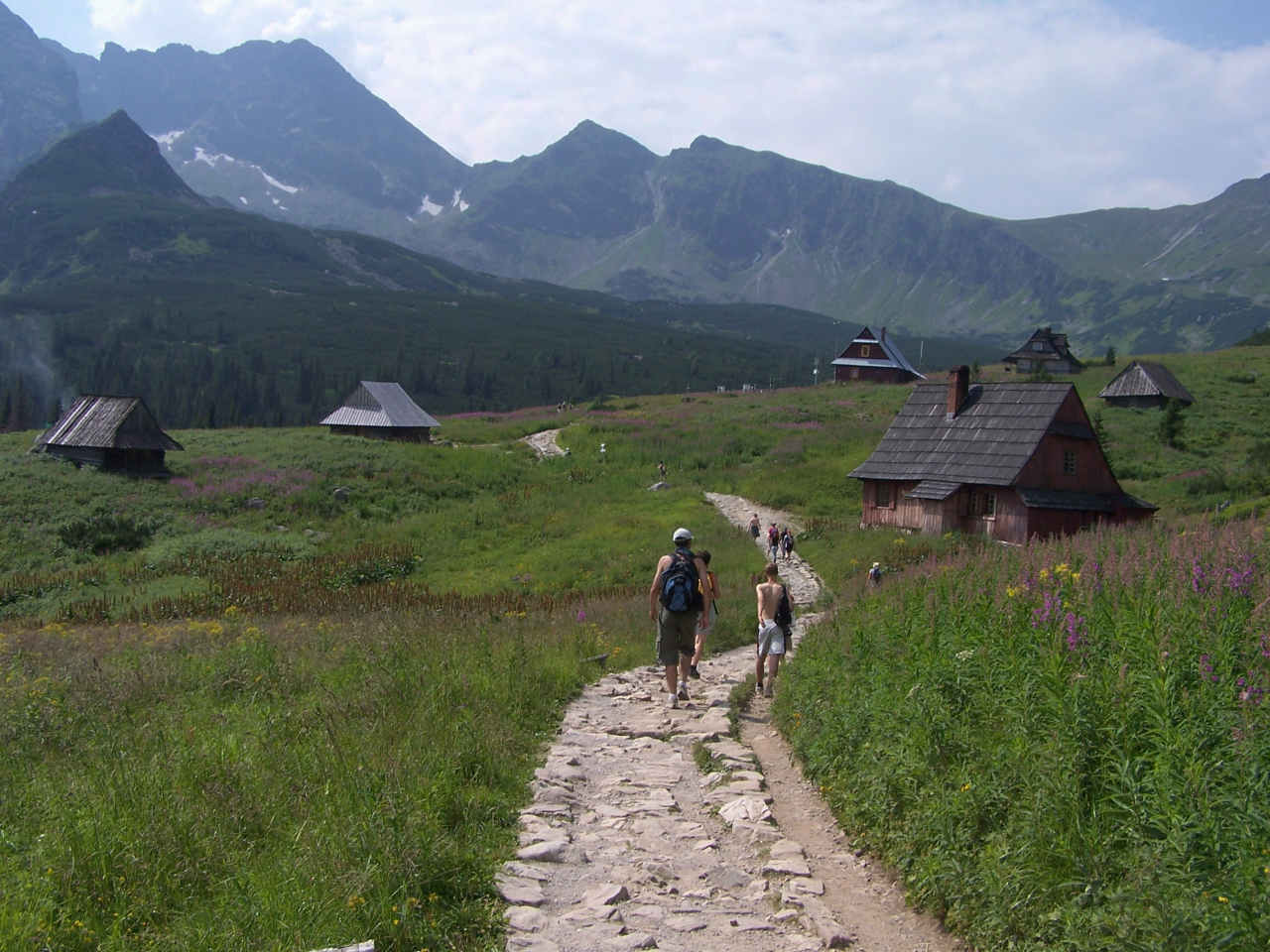
Hala Gąsienicowa

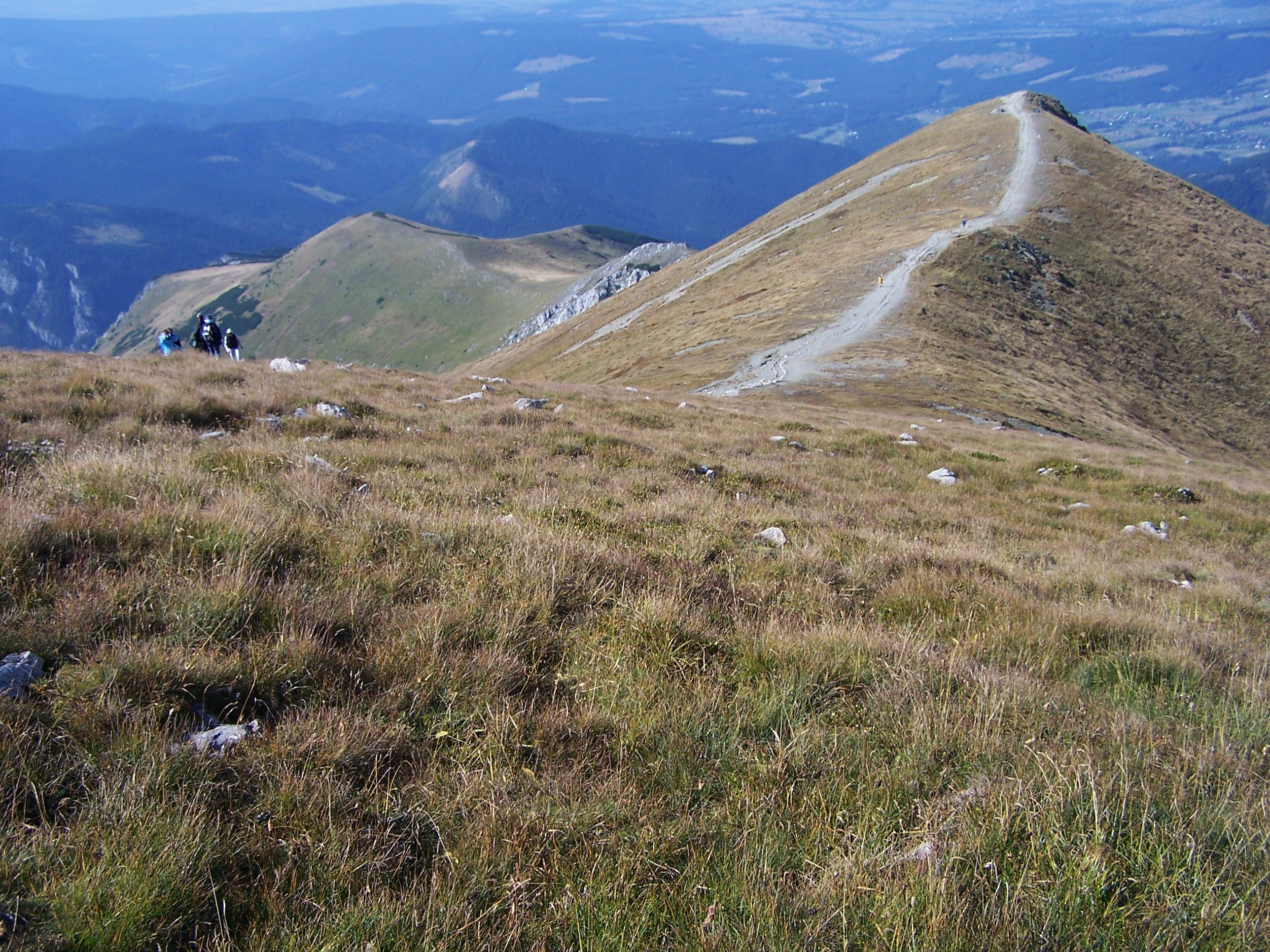
High-altitude pastures on Ciemniak in the Tatra Mountains

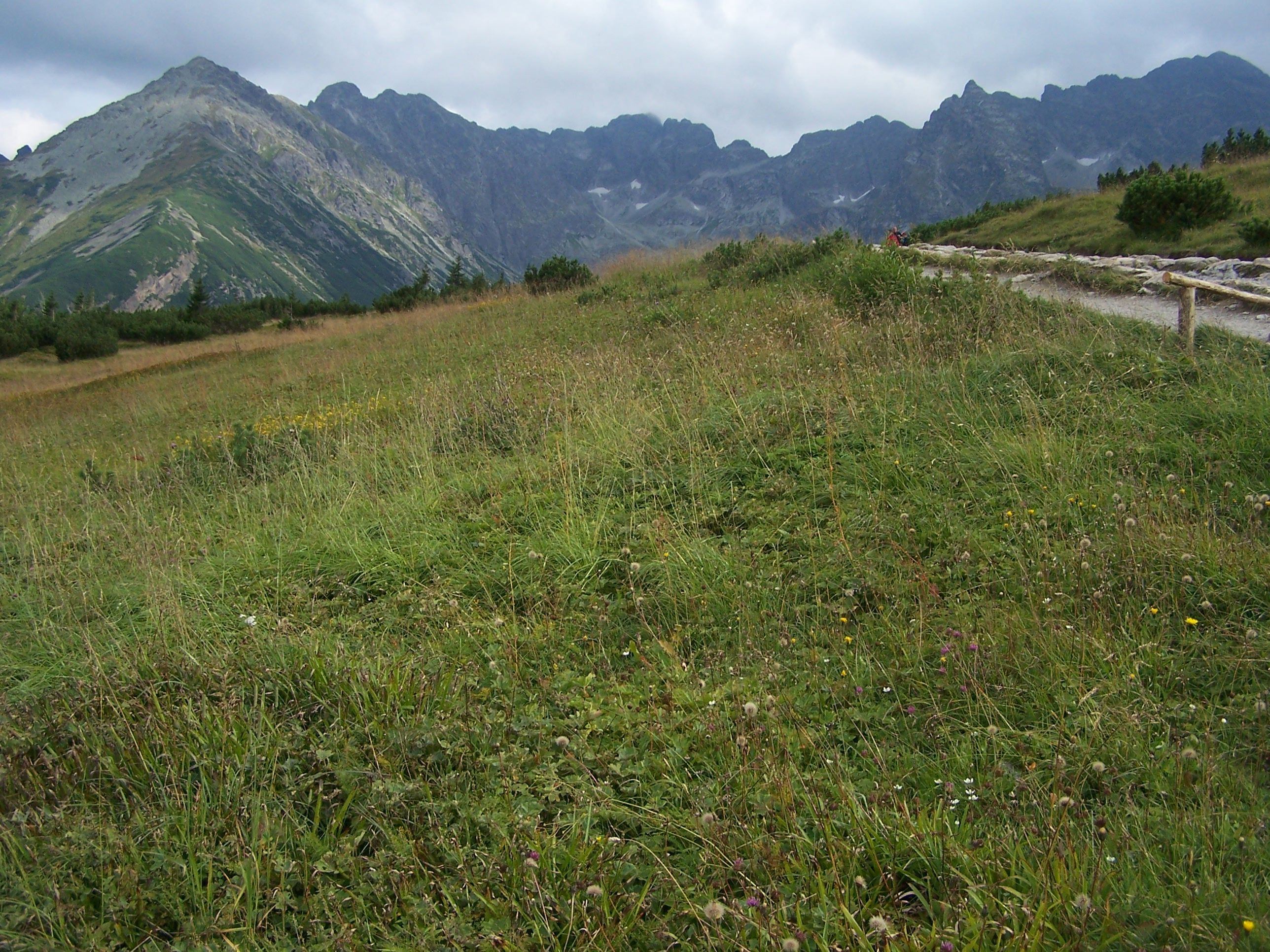
Hala Królowa

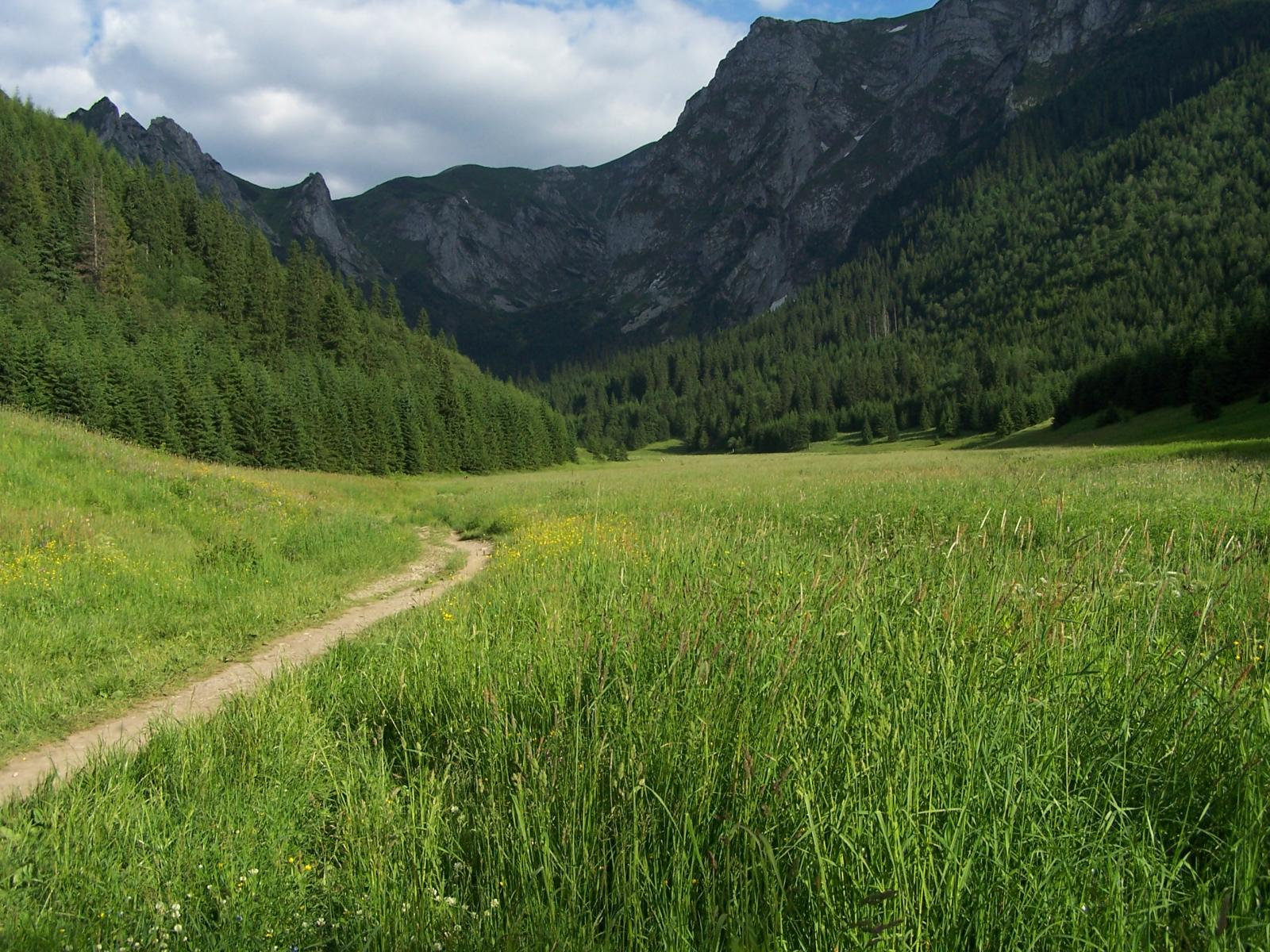
Hala Mała Łąka

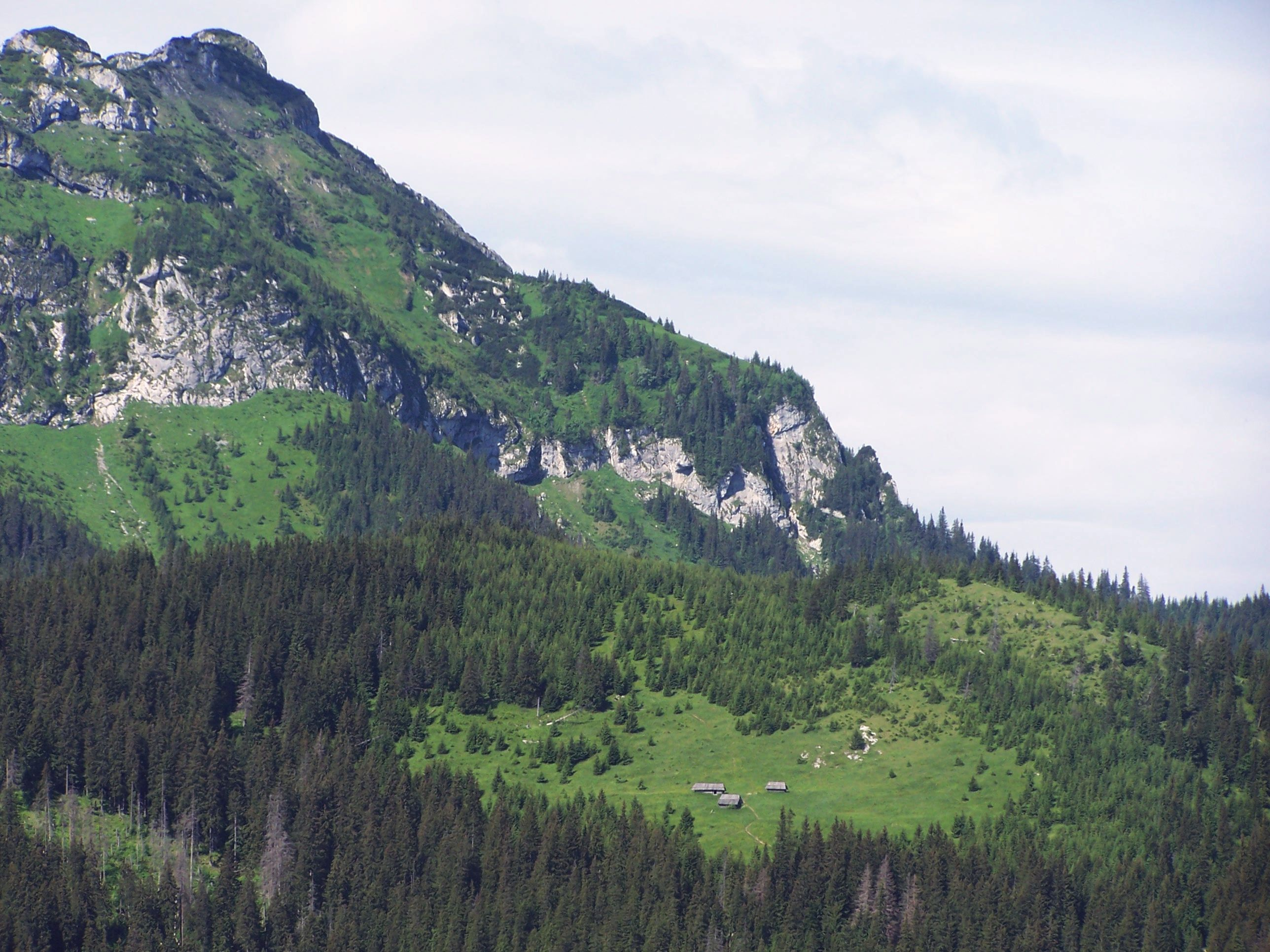
Hala Stoły

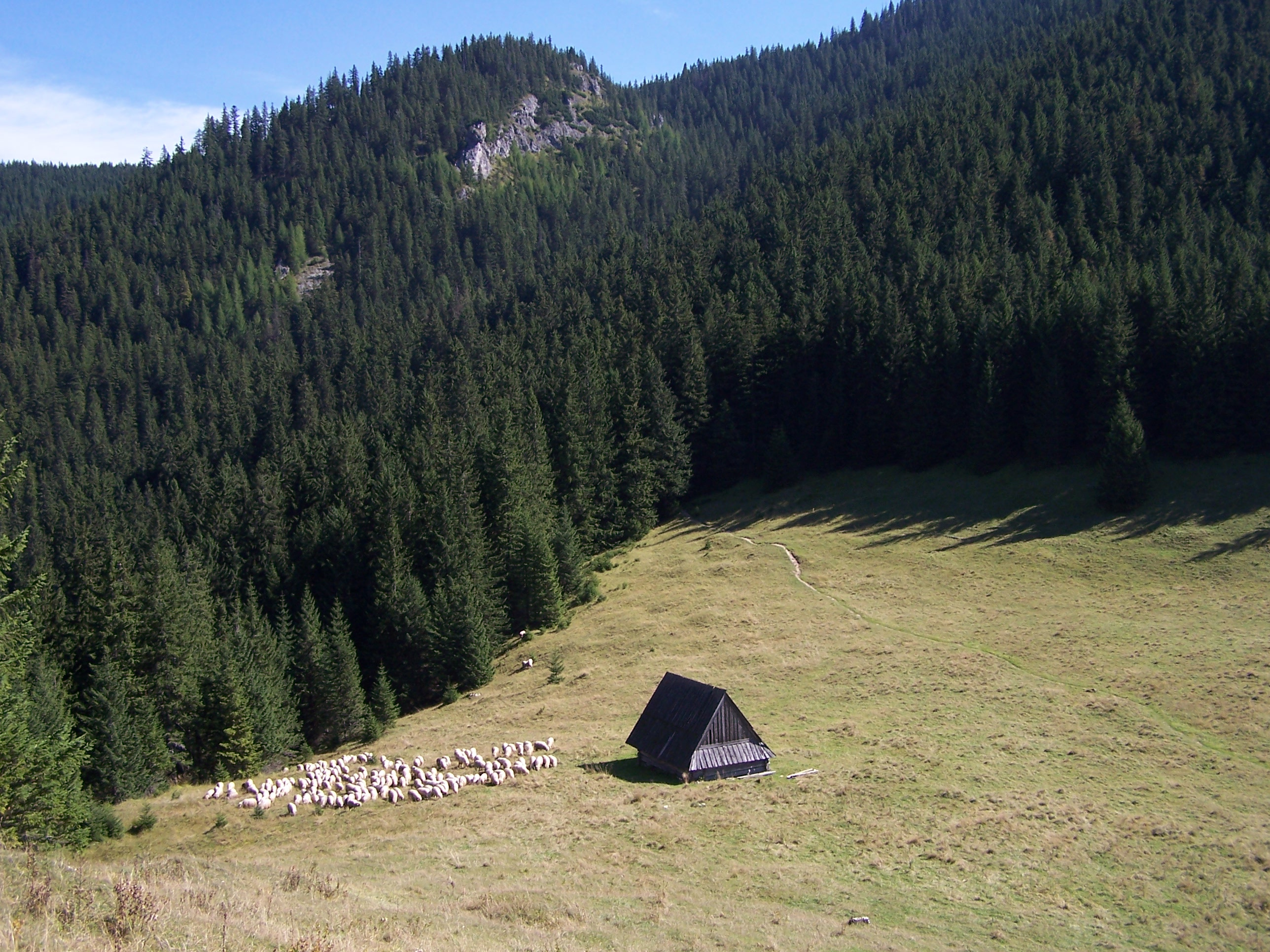
Cultural grazing on Polana Jamy (part of the former Hala Kominy Dudowe)

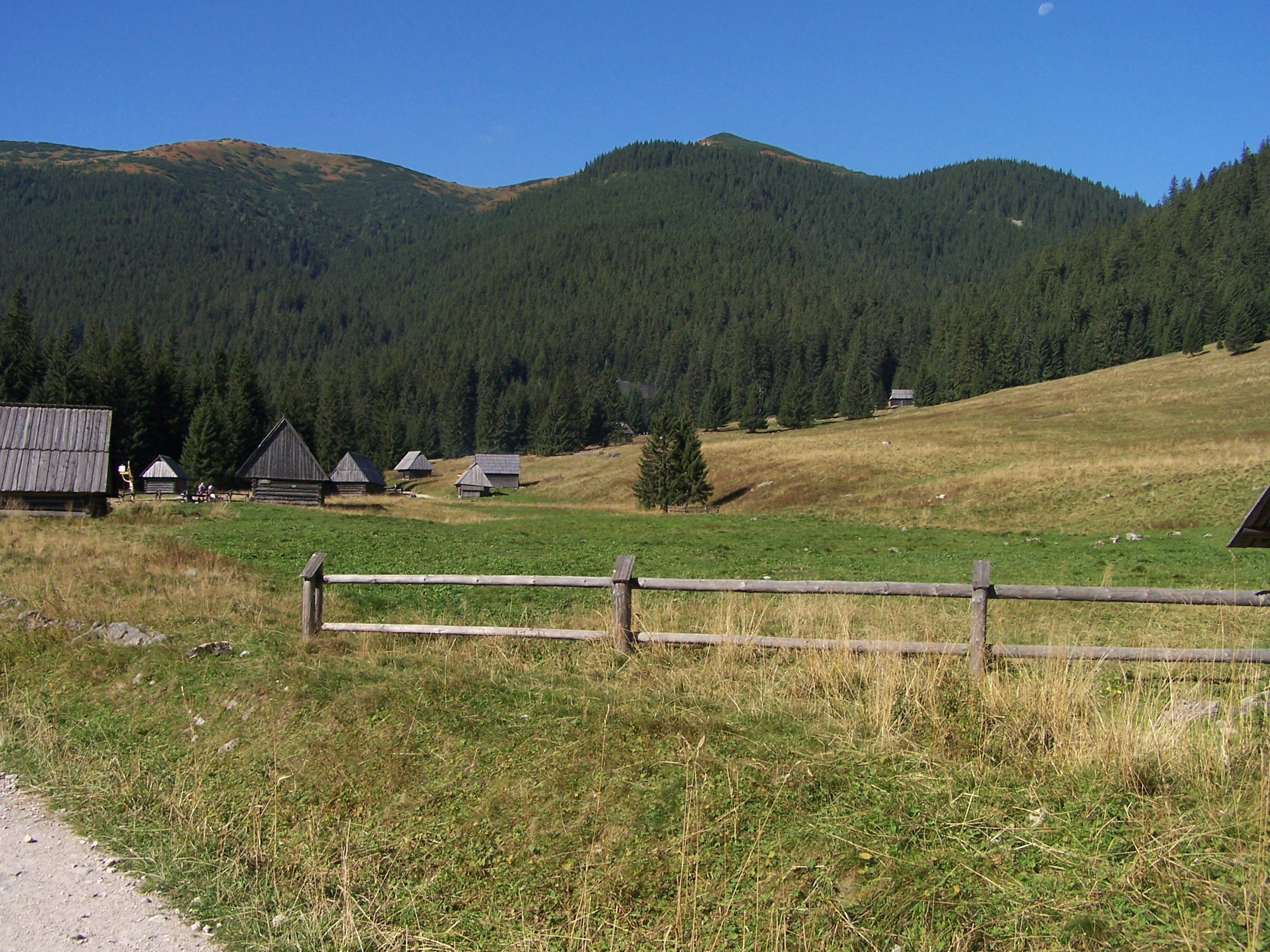
Still-grazed Polana Chochołowska with shepherd huts

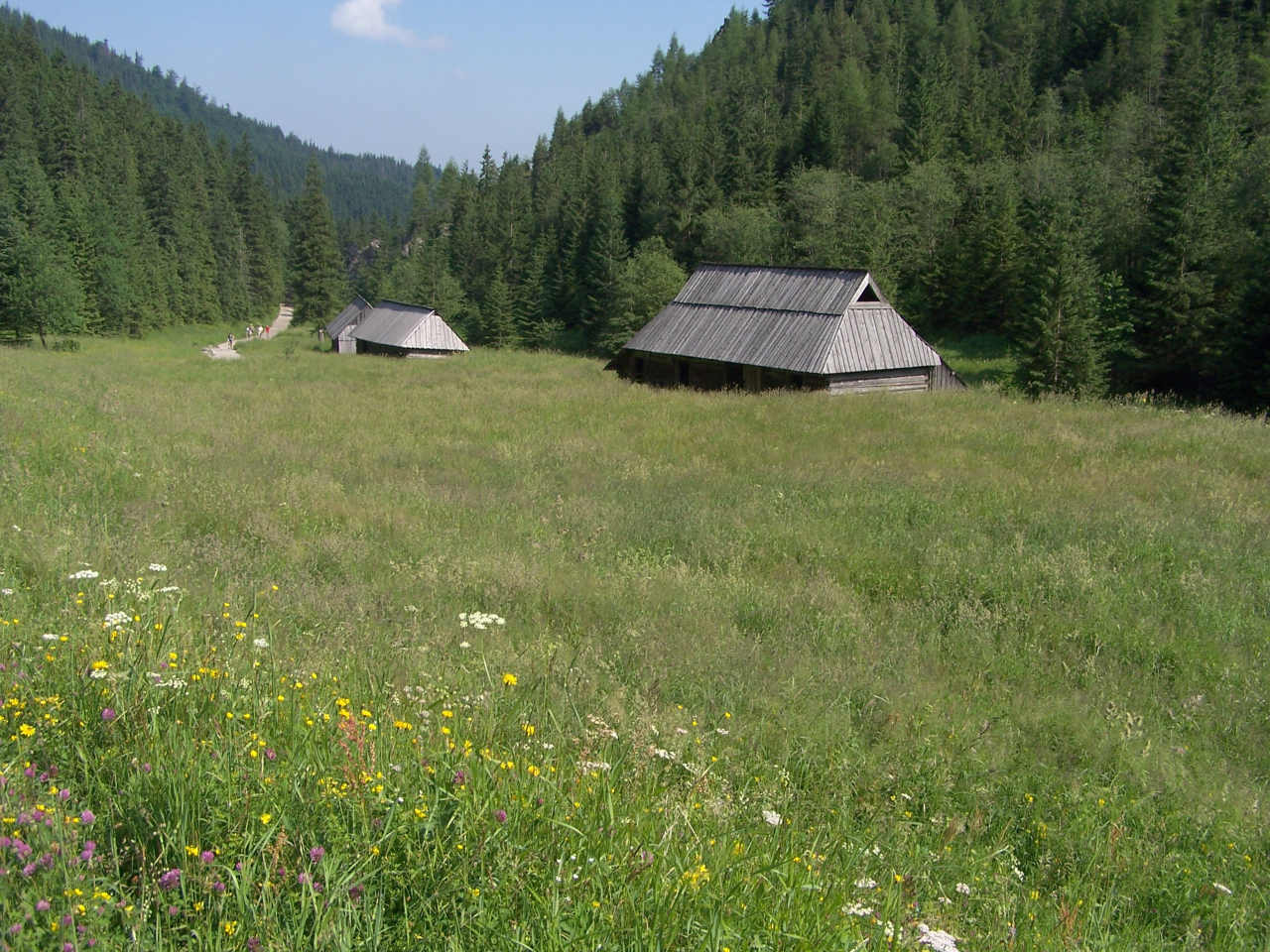
Tree and shrub regrowth is removed on Polana Jaworzynka to prevent forest encroachment

Tatra pastures (Polish: hale tatrzańskie) refer to pastoral and economic land units in the Tatra Mountains used for grazing. In this context, a hala encompassed all mountain terrain suitable for grazing, owned by an individual or group, often named after the owner, such as Hala Goryczkowa, Hala Gąsienicowa, or Hala Skupniowa. These pastures should not be directly equated with high-altitude meadows forming the alpine tundra zone.

== Scope of a pasture ==
A Tatra pasture included not only glades but also sloping meadows, flat meadows, slopes, screes, areas covered with dwarf mountain pine, and even forest. Additionally, highlanders held special grazing privileges, known as easements, in adjacent forest areas. For example, Hala Pisana (Upper and Lower) covered 95.24 ha, with only 12.50 ha as actual pasture, while the rest comprised rocky-grassy slopes (18.00 ha), forests (9.42 ha), mountain pine (3.40 ha), and barren vegetation (51.92 ha). Its servitude area spanned 123.88 ha. Pastures extended from the lower subalpine zone to mountain peaks, such as Hala Upłaz, stretching from just over 1,000 m above sea level to the summit of Ciemniak (2,096 m).

A pasture could encompass an entire valley (e.g., Hala Mała Łąka) or part of one (e.g., Hala Smytnia or Hala Pisana in Kościeliska Valley). It might include one or more meadows, flat areas, or slopes with shepherd huts. Highlanders considered a pasture as terrain suitable for grazing but not mown, unlike a glade, which was mown. If part of a pasture was mown, it was also called a glade, even if not fully surrounded by forest. Tourists often mistakenly call any mountain meadow or glade a hala, or limit the term to grassy areas with huts. While glades were typically part of a pasture, some, like Siwa Polana, existed independently.

In the northern (Polish) Tatra Mountains, pastures were more consistently defined and long-lasting compared to the southern (formerly Hungarian) side, where ownership changed more frequently. The number of pastures varied over time, increasing as new areas were used for grazing, then decreasing as some were abandoned. At the peak of pastoral activity (late 19th to early 20th century), over 40 pastures existed in the Polish Tatras. Some lower pastures, like Hala Toporowa, were converted to farmland, while others, like Hala Wołoszyńska, were subdivided. Hala Trzydniówka was acquired for forestry, and Hala Pyszna was purchased before World War II and turned into the Tomanowa-Smreczyny nature reserve.

== Formation of pastures ==
In the 13th century, the Tatra Mountains and Podhale region were covered by primeval forest. Early settlement in the valleys was sparse. The first pastures emerged through the pastoral activities of the Vlachs, who arrived in waves along the Carpathians from the Balkan Peninsula in the 15th and 16th centuries. Over time, the Vlachs were absorbed by the more numerous local population, who adopted their efficient mountain pastoral practices, traditions, and customs. Initially, grazing occurred above the dwarf mountain pine zone in the alpine tundra, with meadows later created by cutting or burning forests.

The Tatras were then royal property. In exchange for tributes and rents, locals received permits to create meadows, graze pastures, and exercise privileges (servitudes) for collecting firewood, grazing in royal forests, harvesting timber for construction, and hunting. These privileges were typically granted to headman families from specific villages. Historical records show that in 1595, King Sigismund III Vasa granted Tomasz Miętus, a settler of Ciche, grazing rights in "the mountains in Dolinka and Przysłop". These areas form Miętusia Valley, named after Miętus, as are the pasture, meadow, and pass (Przysłop Miętusi). When the Tatras became private property, servitudes were limited to collecting brushwood, fallen timber, fruits, and mushrooms.

The Vlachs also paid tributes for pasture use. Their settlement significantly influenced Podhale's customs and nomenclature. Vlach-derived names include villages like Murzasichle, Olcza, and Zubsuche. Eastern Romance roots are found in terms like bryndza (cheese), ciupaga (axe), gieleta (shepherd's tool), and peak names like Wołoszyn and Kiczora.

== Pastoral challenges ==
Initially, with a small population, grazing had minimal impact on the Tatras. In spring, livestock grazed in villages, moving to pastures only when grass grew on meadows and slopes. Early grazing damage healed quickly. However, as the population grew, so did livestock numbers. By the late 19th century, the situation became critical. Village farmland, fragmented through inheritance, was insufficient to sustain sheep and cattle, with most land needed for crops. Grazing in the Tatras became essential for family survival. Pastures, originally owned by one family, became shared by hundreds across multiple villages through inheritance. For instance, when the Polish State Treasury purchased Hala Gąsienicowa in 1961, it had 381 owners, some entitled to graze only one sheep or even one sheep every four years. Lacking alternatives, highlanders sent livestock to shepherds early in spring, who drove them to the Tatras before the grass had grown. Highlanders claimed, "This is our heritage, granted by Polish kings". Often, shepherds couldn't secure lowland meadows to hold livestock until pasture grass matured, leading to illegal grazing on others' meadows or state forests, causing conflicts. Some shepherds grazed pastures before the grass could establish.

Mowing meadows were excluded from grazing. Pastures primarily consisted of rocky-grassy slopes, slopes, ridges, and servitude forests. By the late 19th century, no patch of slopes or forest escaped repeated grazing by shepherds, despite forestry bans. Even steep slopes with small ledges were grazed by free-roaming rams or goats. The number of sheep, cows, oxen, and goats exceeded the Tatras' capacity.

During World War II, grazing went unregulated. In 1946, 22,402 sheep and 1,115 cattle were grazed, causing erosion on steep slopes. Soil trampled by sharp hooves, especially when wet, was washed away during heavy rains, turning areas like Jaworzynka Valley, Wielki Kopieniec, and Skupniów Upłaz into rocky wastelands. Grazing in forests reduced dwarf mountain pine coverage, increasing winter avalanches. Shepherds hunted marmots, and their dogs scared chamois and other wildlife. Addressing pastoral impacts became urgent.

== Pastures today ==
Post-World War II, alternative grazing areas in the Bieszczady, Pieniny, and Beskid Sądecki – regions vacated by displaced Lemkos – offered better grazing conditions, but few highlanders took advantage. Resistance to grazing restrictions for nature conservation led the Council of Ministers, on 8 December 1960, to mandate the compulsory purchase or exchange of all private Tatra lands between 1960 and 1964. These lands, including pastures and their servitude forests, were incorporated into the Tatra National Park, ceasing to exist as distinct pastoral units.

Cultural grazing persists under strict regulations on select meadows. Pasture names, once central to Podhale's economy, are now historical but have shaped the region's geographic nomenclature, influencing names of valleys, slopes, peaks, and more. Abandoned pastures undergo ecological succession, reverting to forest or dwarf mountain pine appropriate to their altitudinal zonation. Only areas above the natural range of dwarf mountain pine or very steep crags remain treeless. This is evident on Ornak, where once-grassy slopes are increasingly covered by mountain pine, and in Starorobociańska Valley and Pyszniańska Valley, where spruce forests are expanding. Ending grazing has reduced slope erosion, restored forests and mountain pine, and improved wildlife protection. However, it has reduced tourism appeal (as scenic meadows become forested) and biodiversity, as diverse pasture flora is replaced by forest and mountain pine. Studies from between 1955 and 2004 show a 46% reduction in meadow area.

To preserve biodiversity, the Tatra National Park actively manages non-forested areas, covering about 350 ha of former pastures, meadows, and fields under active conservation. These efforts include removing tree regrowth, mowing, grazing, and organic fertilization (e.g., through sheep penning). Cultural grazing of sheep and cattle, totaling 1,000–1,250 animals over 150 ha in 2008, is considered the most effective and eco-friendly way to maintain meadows while preserving pastoral traditions. About 60 ha of meadows undergo tree removal, while pasture forests are managed under separate forest ecosystem programs. Some shepherd huts have been restored.
