= Leszczyny, Tatra County =

Leszczyny
- Village
- Location within Poland
- Coordinates: 49°22′12″N 19°58′27″E
- Country: Poland
- Voivodeship: Lesser Poland
- County: Tatra
- Gmina: Biały Dunajec
- Highest elevation: 1,010 m (3,310 ft)
- Lowest elevation: 920 m (3,020 ft)
- Population: 290

Leszczyny [lɛʂˈt͡ʂɨnɨ] is a village in the administrative district of Gmina Biały Dunajec, within Tatra County, Lesser Poland Voivodeship, in southern Poland.
