= Bustryk =

- Village
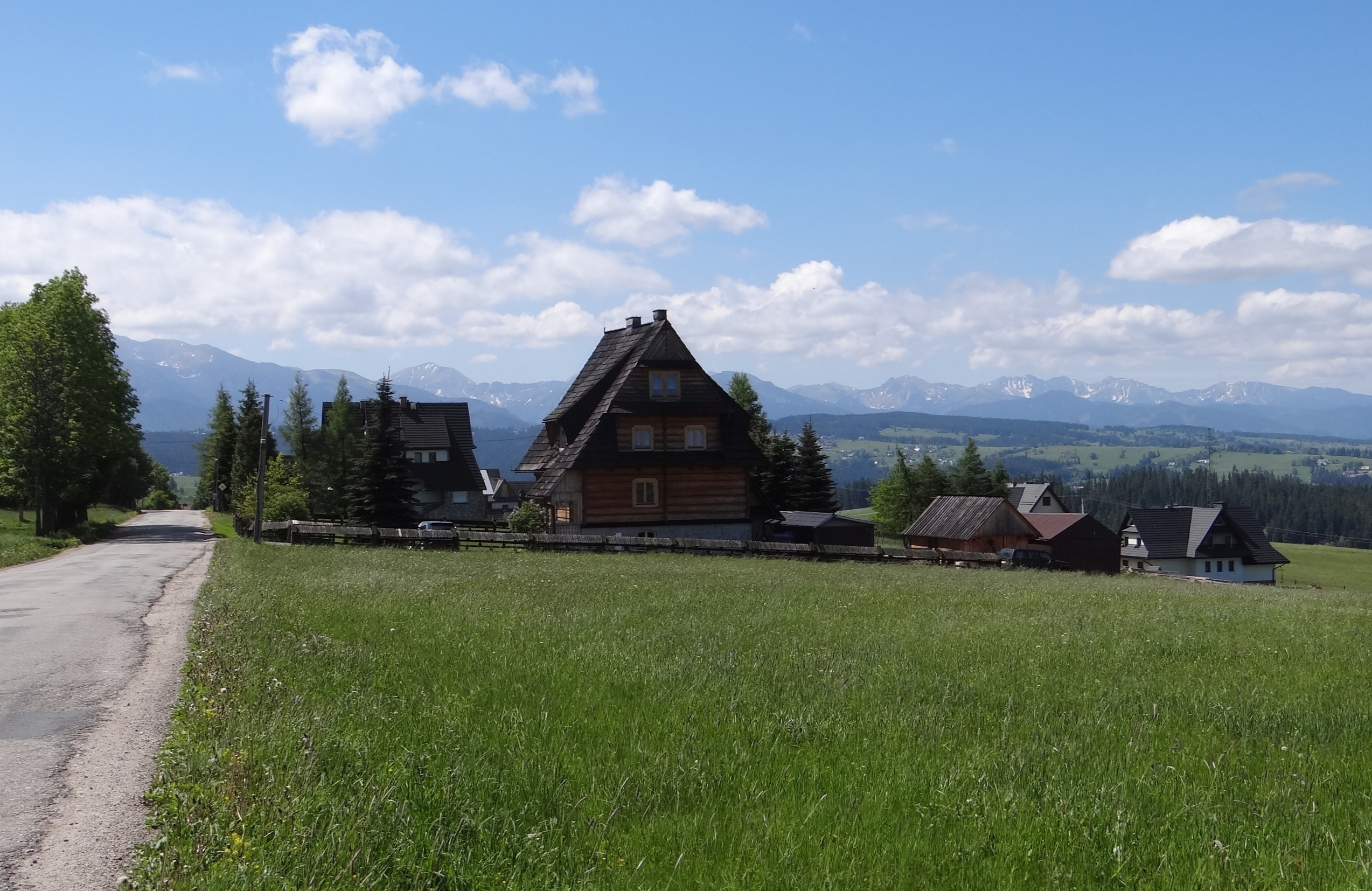
- Houses in Bustryk. Tatra Mountains in the background.

- Location within Poland
- Coordinates: 49°21′19″N 19°57′57″E
- Country: Poland
- Voivodeship: Lesser Poland
- County: Tatra
- Gmina: Poronin

Population
  - Total: 720

Bustryk [ˈbustrɨk] is a village in the administrative district of Gmina Poronin, within Tatra County, Lesser Poland Voivodeship, in southern Poland.
