= Poronin =

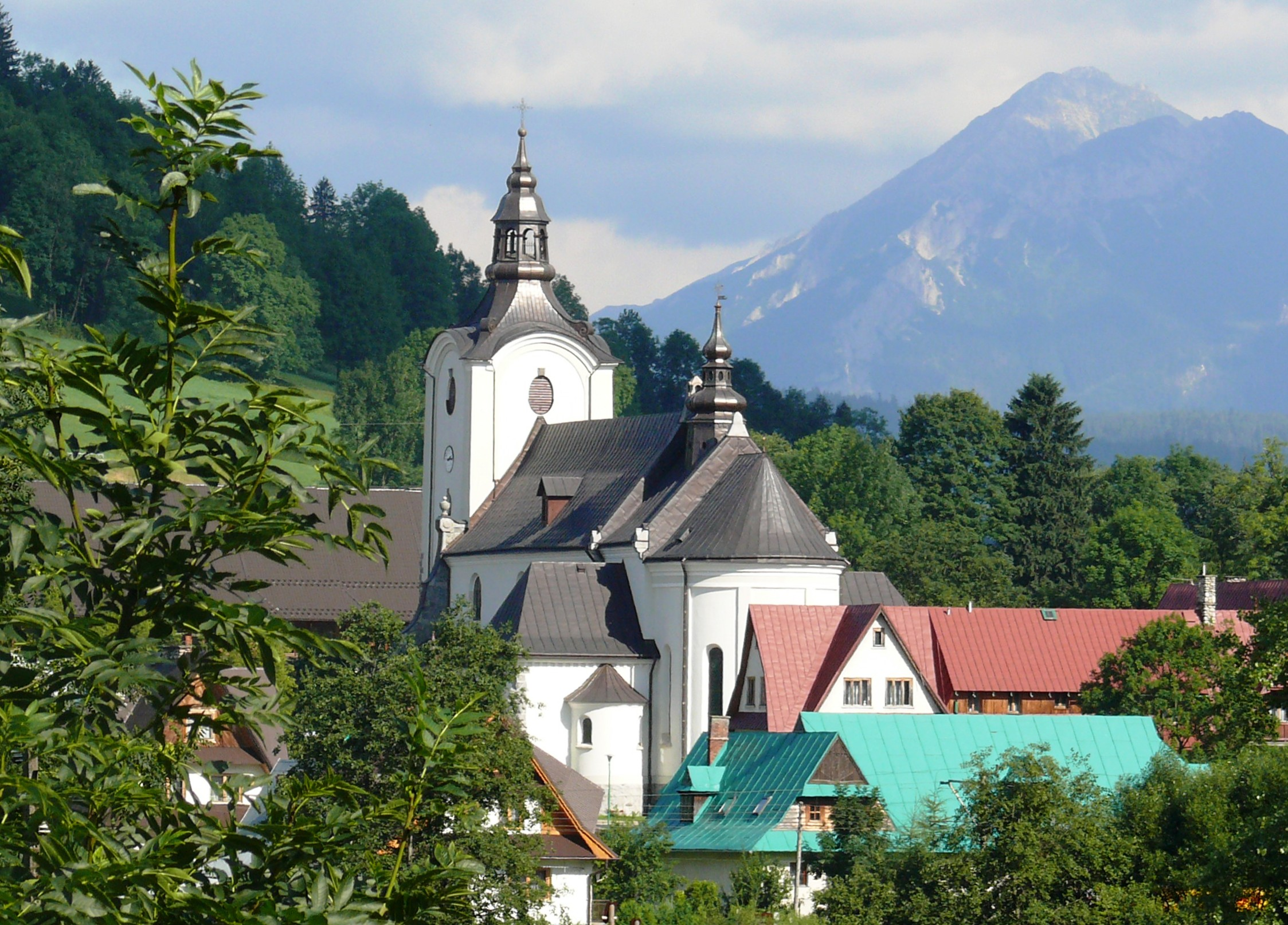
- Mary Magdalene Church

- Coat of arms

- Location within Poland
- Coordinates: 49°20′40″N 20°0′23″E
- Country: Poland
- Voivodeship: Lesser Poland
- County: Tatra
- Gmina: Poronin
- Elevation: 740 m (2,430 ft)

Population (2006)
  - Total: 3,900
- Time zone: UTC+1 (CET)
  - Summer (DST): UTC+2 (CEST)
- Postal code: 34-520
- Area code: +48 18
- Car plates: KTT
- Website: http://www.poronin.pl

Poronin (Polish pronunciation: [pɔˈrɔnin]) is a village in southern Poland. From 1999 it formed part of Tatra County of the Lesser Poland Voivodeship (it was previously in Nowy Sącz Voivodeship from 1975 to 1998).

Poronin sits on the confluence of rivers Zakopianka and Poroniec, which gives rise to the river Biały Dunajec.

In the summers of 1913 and 1914 Vladimir Lenin and Nadezhda Krupskaya rented a holiday home in nearby Biały Dunajec and often stayed in a Poronin inn. The area formed part of Austria-Hungary at that time (as a result of the Partitions of Poland), and when World War I broke out in mid-1914 the Austrian authorities arrested Lenin on suspicion of spying for Russia (August 1914), but deported him to Switzerland soon after (September 1914).

During 1947-1990 there used to be a Lenin Museum in Poronin and a statue of Lenin. The statue was transferred to the Socialist Realism Art Gallery (Polish: Galeria Sztuki Socrealizmu, also known as the "Museum of Socialist Realism") in the Kozłówka Palace complex in the Lublin Voivodeship.
