= Sierockie =

- Village
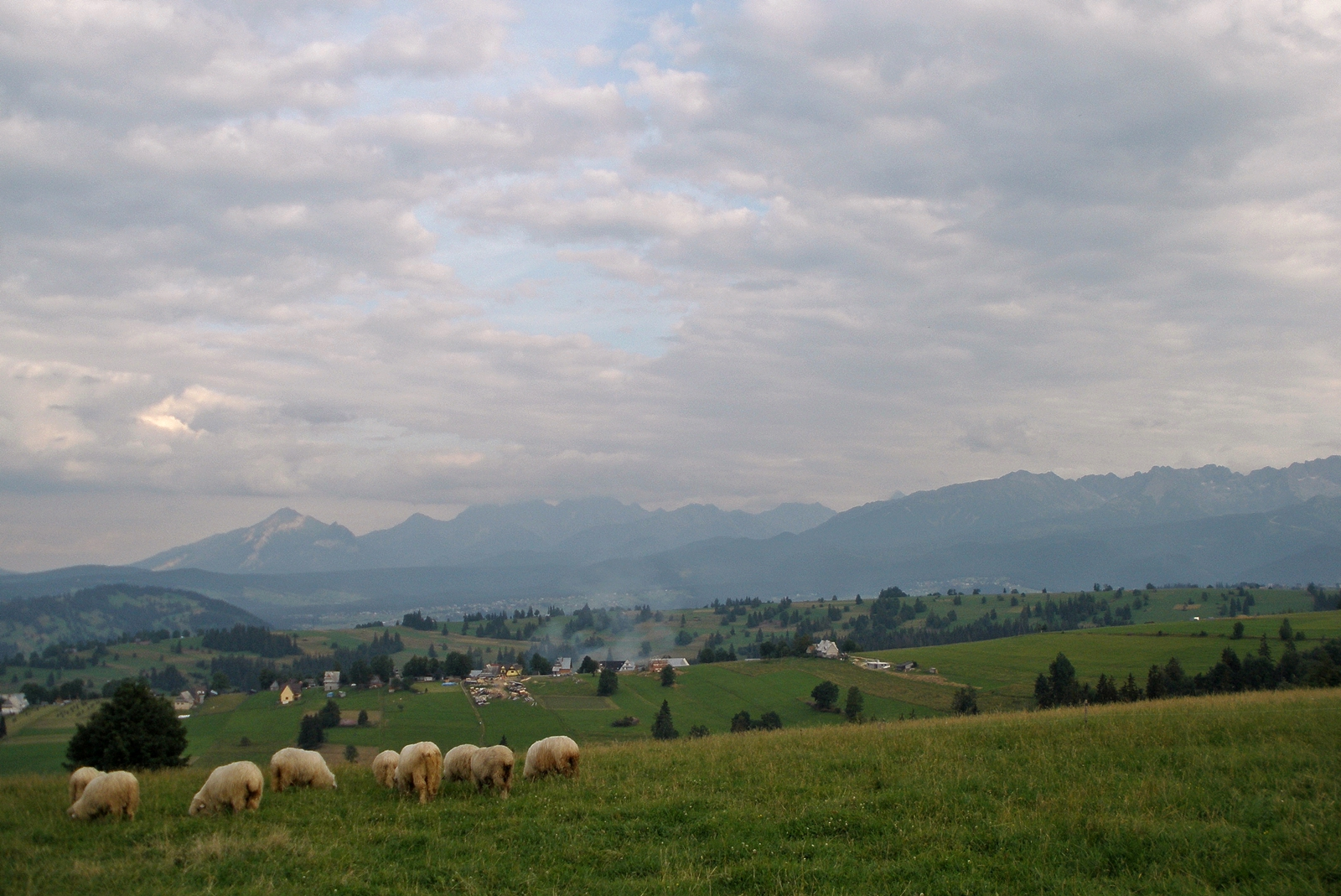
- View from the pastures around Sierockie

- Location within Poland
- Coordinates: 49°22′36″N 19°57′37″E
- Country: Poland
- Voivodeship: Lesser Poland
- County: Tatra
- Gmina: Biały Dunajec
- Highest elevation: 1,010 m (3,310 ft)
- Lowest elevation: 920 m (3,020 ft)
- Population: 550

Sierockie [ɕɛˈrɔt͡skʲɛ] is a village in the administrative district of Gmina Biały Dunajec, within Tatra County, Lesser Poland Voivodeship, in southern Poland.
