= Suche, Lesser Poland Voivodeship =

Suche
- Village
- Location within Poland
- Coordinates: 49°20′13″N 19°58′58″E
- Country: Poland
- Voivodeship: Lesser Poland
- County: Tatra
- Gmina: Poronin
- Population: 1,200

Suche [ˈsuxɛ], (Slovak: Suché) is a village in the administrative district of Gmina Poronin, within Tatra County, Lesser Poland Voivodeship, in southern Poland.
