= Siwa Polana =

Glade in the Tatra Mountains, Poland

- Glade
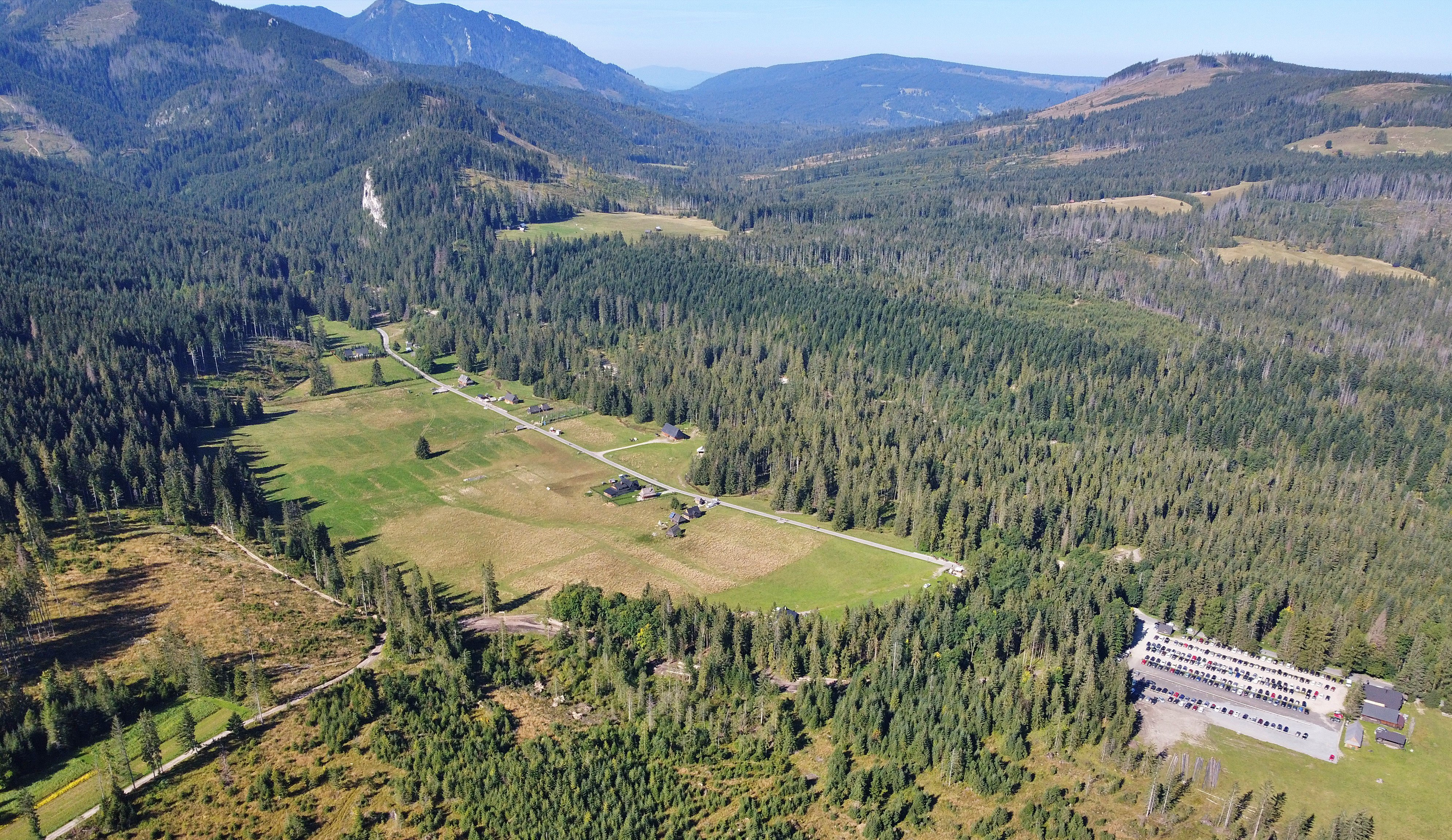
- View of Siwa Polana from the northeast

- Coordinates: 49°16′45″N 19°50′19″E
- Location: Western Tatras, Tatra County, Lesser Poland Voivodeship, Poland
- Range: Tatras
- Elevation: 922 m (3,025 ft)

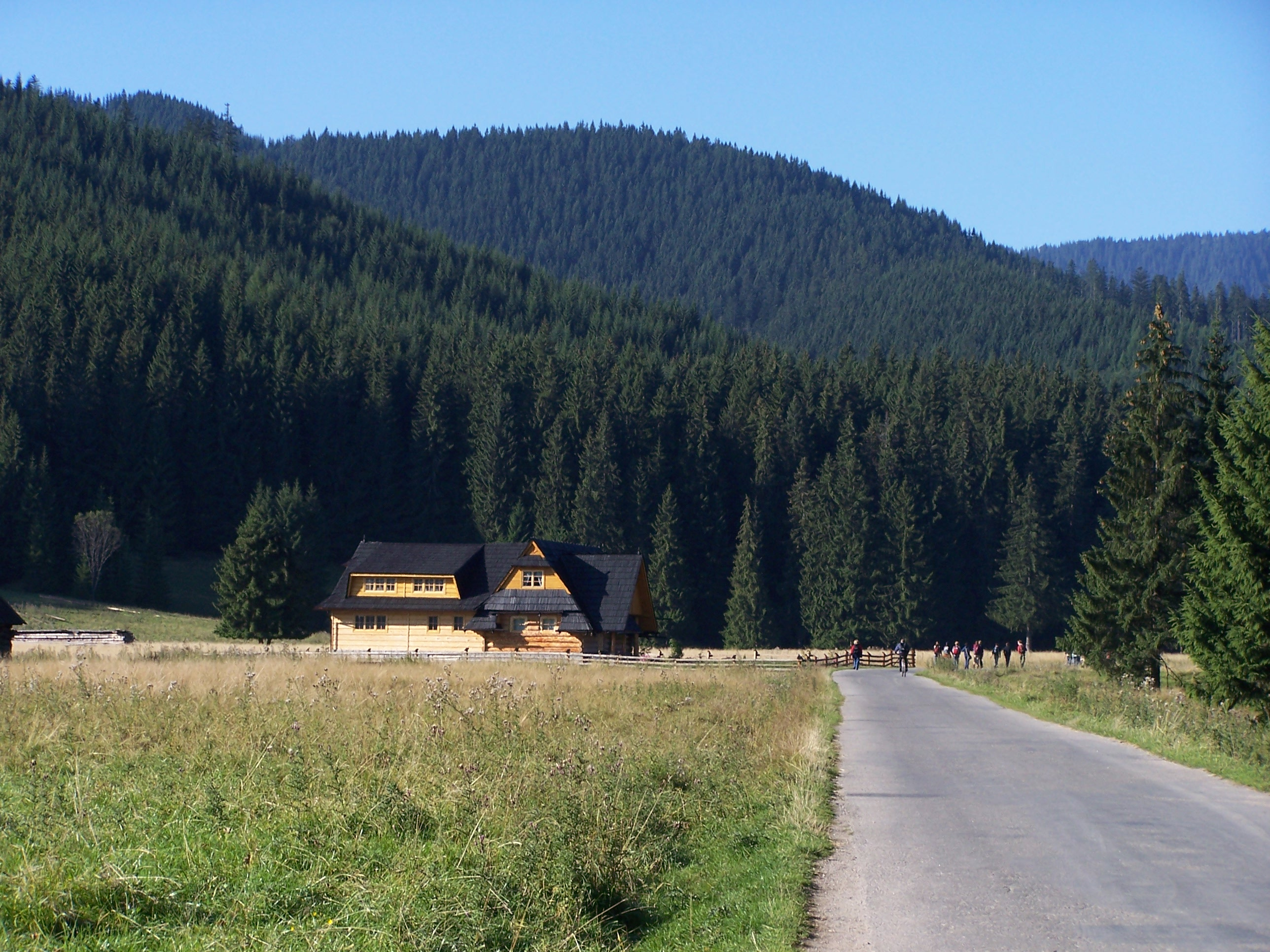
Southern end of the glade

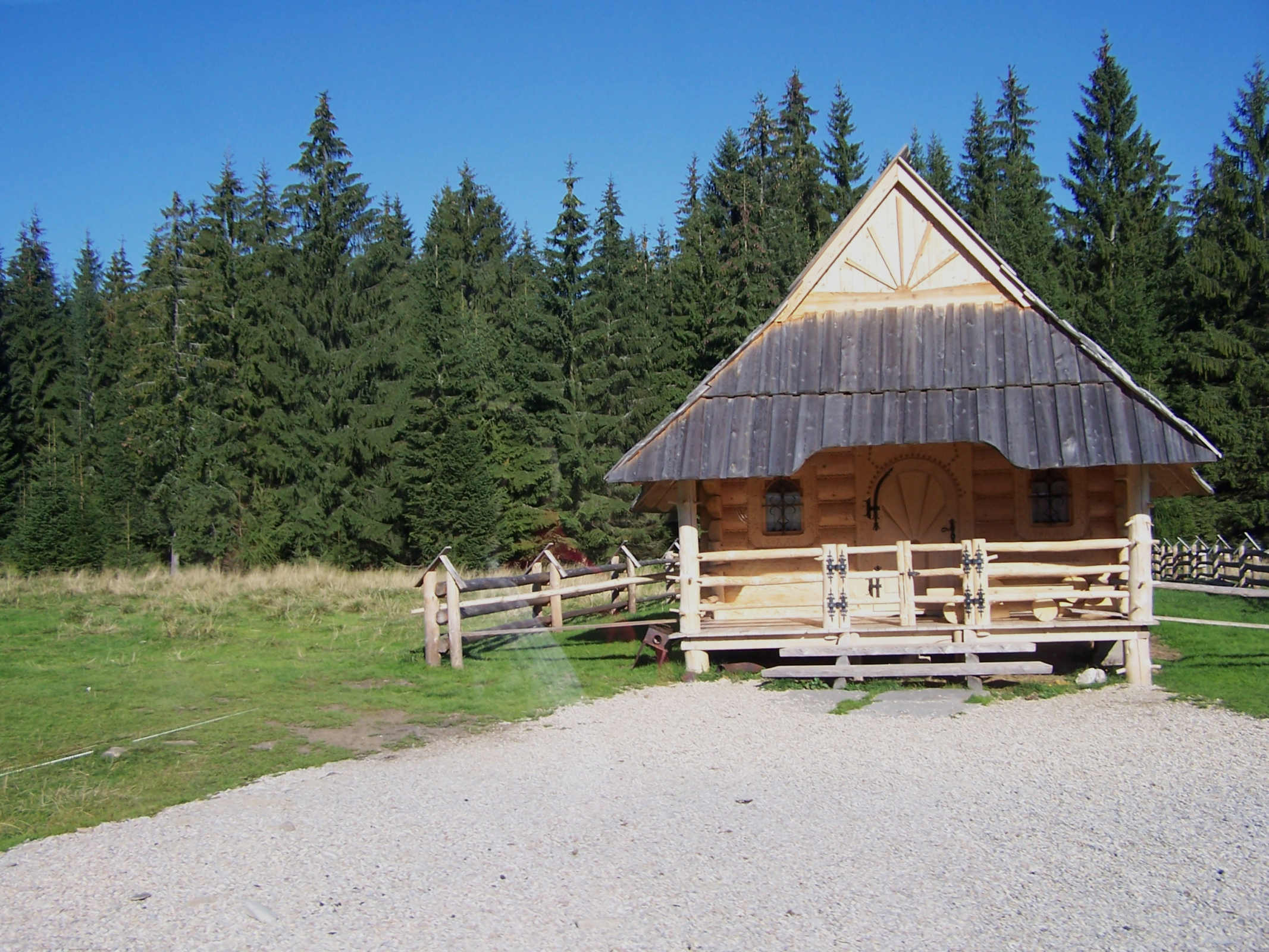
Hut on the glade

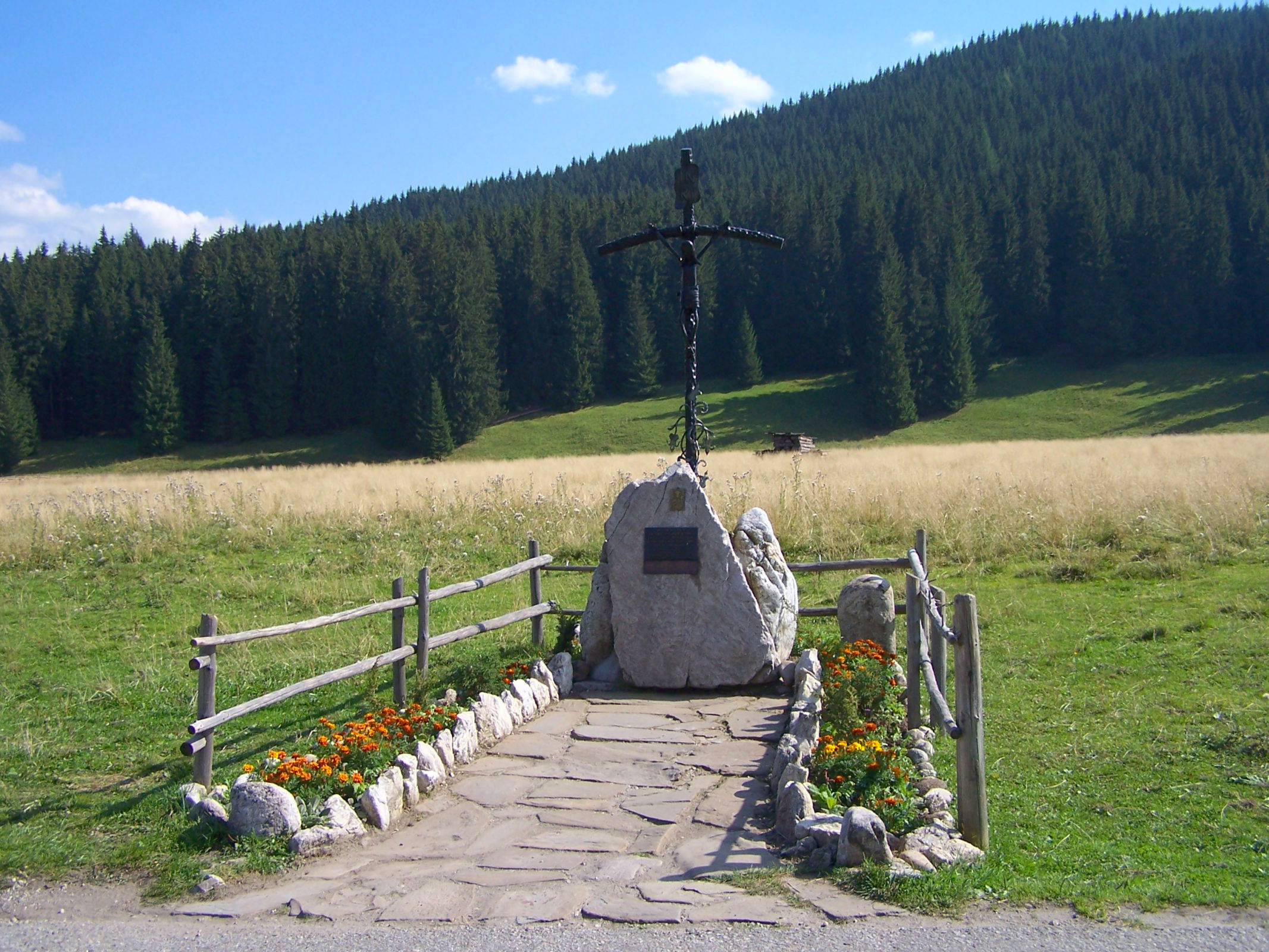
Cross commemorating the pilgrimage of Pope John Paul II

Siwa Polana is a forest glade located at an altitude of 910–935 meters above sea level at the entrance to Chochołowska Valley, on the edge of the Western Tatras in the microregion known as Kościelisko Trench. It is situated 1 km from the road junction in Roztoki, through which runs the road connecting Zakopane, Witów, and Czarny Dunajec. A narrow paved road leads to the glade from this junction, with a forester's lodge and houses along the way.

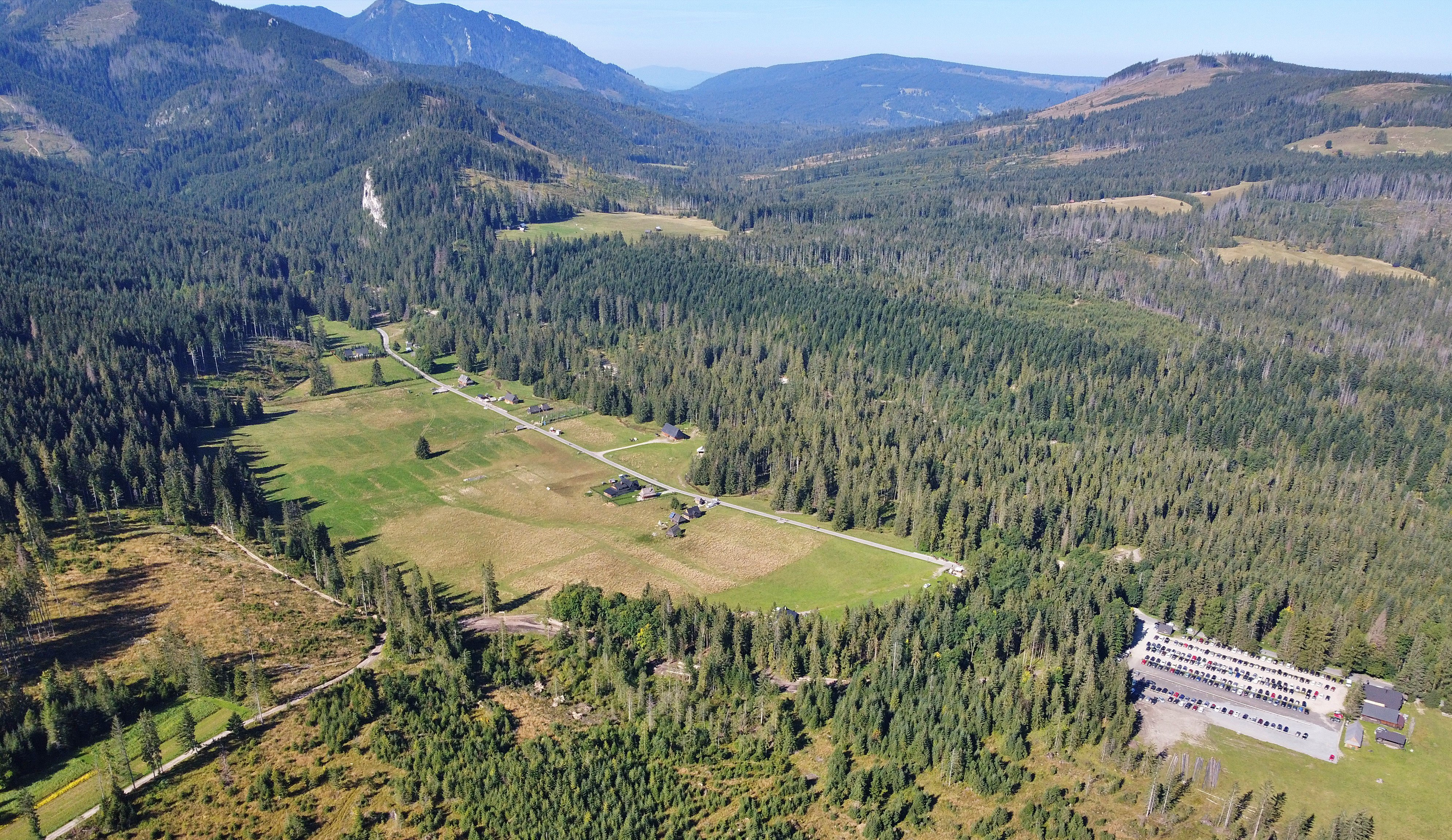
Siwa Polana (view from the northeast)

== History and heritage ==
Siwa Polana was once an independent glade (i.e., not part of any mountain pasture). It was mowed and heavily grazed. Sheep flocks driven to higher pastures in Chochołowska Valley would stop here to rest. The glade was communally owned, primarily by farmers from Czarny Dunajec. Around 1800, it had 24 owners. In 1809, one of them, Jan Łusczek, erected a wooden cross inscribed with: "Fundator Jan Łusczek A.D. 1809".

Siwa Polana also witnessed tragic events. On 27 December 1939, German occupiers executed nine Poles here. A boulder and memorial plaque at the southern end of the glade commemorate this event.

During John Paul II's second pilgrimage to Poland on 23 June 1983, his helicopter landed on Siwa Polana. To commemorate this, local highlanders restored an early 19th-century iron cross embedded in stone, located in the center of the glade on the left side of the road, and added a plaque marking the event.

Several original buildings from the pastoral era remain on Siwa Polana, including shelters, barns, stables, and summer cabins, forming a "summer village". Many new wooden buildings have since been constructed.

== Flora ==
In spring, crocuses bloom on the glade, followed by autumn crocuses in fall. Siwa Polana is the lowest elevation in Poland where the rare Tatra plant, Trollius altissimus, grows naturally.

== Tourism ==
Siwa Polana continues to be used for pastoral farming, with cultural grazing of sheep and cattle. Visitors can purchase oscypek cheese and bundz. However, its primary role today is as a tourist hub, serving as the starting point for exploring Chochołowska Valley. It is accessible by car or bus, with further motorized vehicle access prohibited. Facilities include a paid parking lot, a bus terminal, mountain bike rentals, food stalls, a tavern, a shop, the Rakoń tourist train, and a ticket booth for the Tatra National Park. Tickets are sold by the Community Forest of Eight Villages, based in Witów, which owns the Chochołowska and Lejowa Valley areas, rather than the park authority. Travel options include:

- On foot: to Chochołowska Polana (7.5 km) in 1 hour 55 minutes.
- By the Rakoń tourist train: runs every 30 minutes to Huciska glade.
- By bicycle: rentals allow travel beyond the train to the forester's lodge.
- By horse-drawn carriage: reaches Chochołowska Polana.

== Hiking trails ==
A green trail runs along the upper edge of the glade, on the forest border, from Kiry past the entrance to Lejowa Valley to the southwestern edge of Siwa Polana, where it joins the paved road entering the Tatra National Park and continues along the Chochołowska Valley floor to the Polish Tourist and Sightseeing Society's shelter on Chochołowska Polana. The trail extends the Droga pod Reglami trail.

- Time from Kiry to Siwa Polana: 50 minutes round trip.
- Time from Siwa Polana to the shelter: 1 hour 55 minutes, ↓ 1 hour 30 minutes.
- Time from the trail-road junction to the parking and ticket booth: 15 minutes round trip.
