= Gliczarów Górny =

- Village
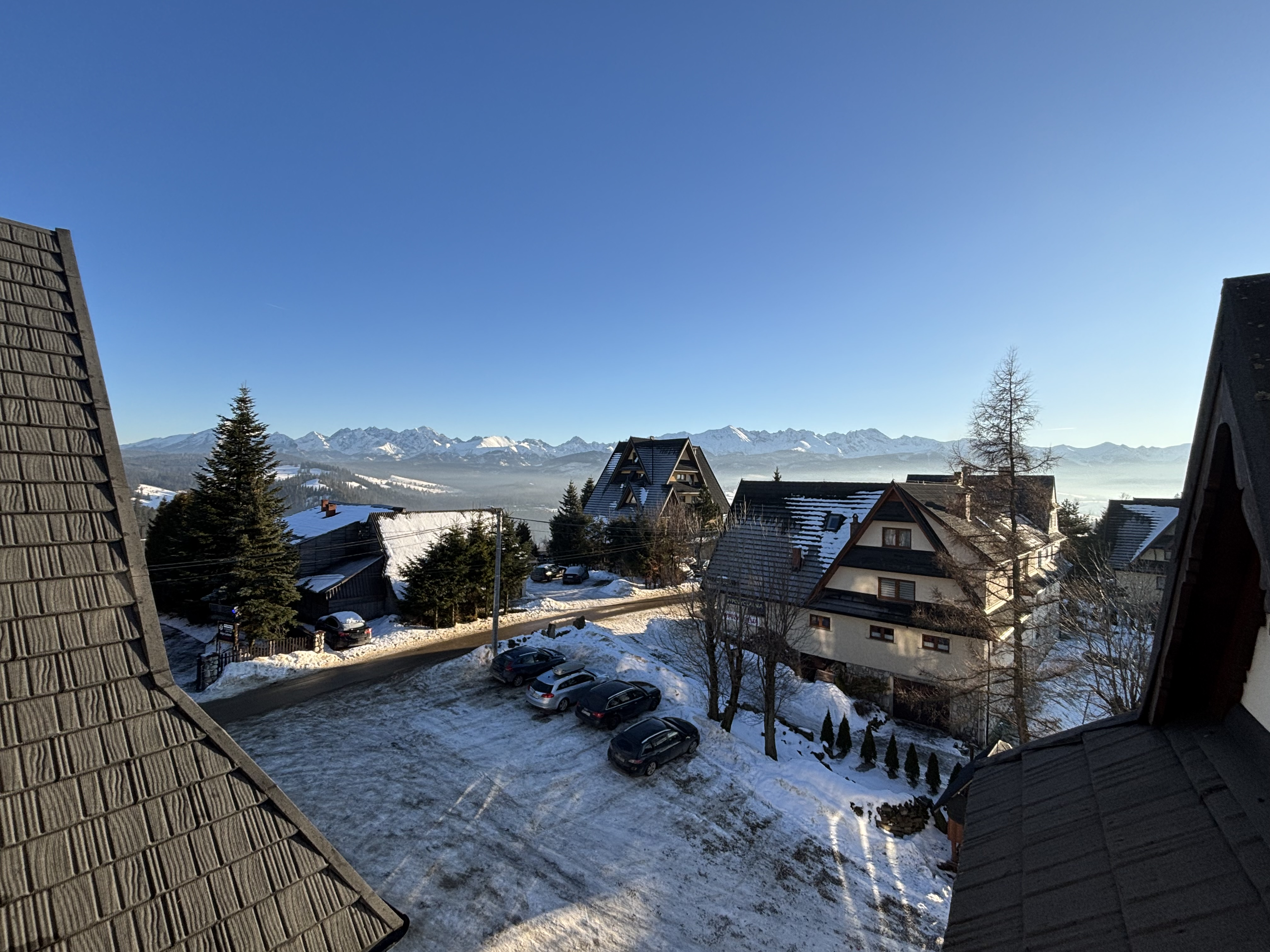

- Location within Poland
- Coordinates: 49°21′N 20°3′E
- Country: Poland
- Voivodeship: Lesser Poland
- County: Tatra
- Gmina: Biały Dunajec
- Highest elevation: 1,006 m (3,301 ft)
- Lowest elevation: 900 m (3,000 ft)
- Population: 818
- Website: https://gliczarow-gorny.pl

Gliczarów Górny [ɡliˈt͡ʂaruf ˈɡurnɨ] is a village in the administrative district of Gmina Biały Dunajec, within Tatra County, Lesser Poland Voivodeship, in southern Poland.
