= Twinkle Brothers =

Jamaican reggae band

- Origin: Falmouth, Jamaica
- Genres: Reggae, Dub
- Years active: 1962–present
- Labels: Virgin Records, Twinkle Records
- Members: Norman Grant; Ralston Grant; Dub Judah; Black Steel; Jerry Lions; Demondo; Barry Prince; Aron Shamash
- Past members: Eric Barnard; Karl Hyatt; Albert Green
- Website: twinklebrothersmusic.com

The Twinkle Brothers are a Jamaican reggae band formed in 1962, and still active in the 21st century under Norman Grant's lead.

== History ==
The Twinkle Brothers were formed in 1962 by brothers Norman (vocals, drums) and Ralston Grant (vocals, rhythm guitar) from Falmouth, Jamaica. The band was expanded with the addition of Eric Barnard (piano), Karl Hyatt (vocals, percussion), and Albert Green (congas, percussion).

After winning local talent competitions, they recorded their first single, "Somebody Please Help Me," in 1966 for producer Leslie Kong. This was followed by sessions for other top Jamaican producers such as Duke Reid, Lee "Scratch" Perry, Sid Bucknor, Phil Pratt, and Bunny Lee. The band worked in the late 1960s and early 1970s on the island's hotel circuit, playing a mixture of calypso, soul, pop, and soft reggae, and in the early 1970s, they began producing their own recordings. Their debut album, Rasta Pon Top, was released in 1975, featuring strongly-Rastafari-oriented songs such as "Give Rasta Praise" and "Beat Them Jah Jah".

As well as producing Twinkle Brothers work, Norman Grant also produced other artists since the mid-1970s, including several albums by E.T. Webster. In 1977, the band were signed to Virgin Records' Frontline label, leading to the release of the Love, Praise Jah, and Countrymen albums. When the band were dropped by Virgin Records in the early 1980s, Norman Grant moved to the United Kingdom, and carried on effectively as a solo artist, but still using the Twinkle Brothers name, and continued with regular releases well into the 2000s, mainly on his own Twinkle label.

Since the early 1990s Twinkle Brothers have been regularly collaborating with the Polish band Trebunie-Tutki, in which they fuse reggae and traditional music from the Tatra Mountains. An analysis of this collaboration can be found in the popular world music textbook, Worlds of Music and in more detail in the musical ethnography Making Music in the Polish Tatras.

Currently led by founding member Norman Grant - as well as bass player Dub Judah, Black Steel and Jerry Lions on guitar, Aron Shamash on the keyboards, Barry Prince on drums, and their engineer Derek "Demondo" Fevrier - the Twinkle Brothers are widely considered to be one of the best live foundation reggae bands in circulation, and they continue to play regularly all over the world to a loyal fanbase.

== Albums ==
- Rasta Pon Top (1975) Grounation
- Love (1977) Front Line
- Praise Jah (1979) Front Line
- Countrymen (1980) Front Line
- Me No You (1981) Twinkle
- Underground (1982) Twinkle
- Dub Massacre part 1 (1982) Twinkle
- Burden Bearer (1983) Twinkle
- Enter Zion (1983) Twinkle
- Crucial Cuts (1983) Virgin
- Dub Massacre Part 2 (1983) Twinkle
- Live From Reggae Sunsplash (1984) Twinkle
- Right Way (1985)
- Kilimanjaro (1985) Twinkle
- Anti-Apartheid (1985) Twinkle
- Dub Massacre Part 3 (1985) Twinkle
- Respect and Honour (1987) Twinkle
- Twinkle Love Songs (1987) Twinkle
- All The Hits From 1970-88 (1988) Twinkle
- New Songs For Jah (1989) Twinkle
- Rastafari Chant (1989) Twinkle
- Dub Massacre Part 4 (1989) Twinkle
- All Is Well (1990) Twinkle
- Free Africa (1990) Front Line
- Live In Warsaw (1990) Twinkle
- Unification (1990) Twinkle
- Wind of Change (1990) Twinkle
- Dub Massacre Part 5 - Lion Head (1990) Twinkle
- Old Cuts (1991)
- Don't Forget Africa (1992) Twinkle
- Twinkle Love Songs volume 2 (1992) Twinkle
- Dub With Strings (1992) Twinkle
- Babylon Rise Again (1992) Twinkle
- Higher Heights (1992) Twinkle Music (with Polish folk band Trebunie-Tutki)
- Comeback Twinkle 2 (1994) Ryszard (with Polish folk band Trebunie-Tutki)
- Dub Massacre Part 6 - Dub Feeding Program (1994) Twinkle
- Chant Down Babylon (1995) Twinkle
- Dub Plate (1995) Twinkle
- Dub Salute Part 5 (1996) Jah Shaka
- Final Call (1997) Twinkle
- Greatest Hits (1997) Kahamuk (with Trebunie Tutki)
- Twinkle Love Songs, Vol. 3; Heart to Heart (2000) Twinkle
- Live At Maritime Hall: San Francisco (2001) 2B1
- Old Time Something (2002) Twinkle
- Will This World Survive (2002) Twinkle
- Give The Sufferer A Chance (2004) Twinkle
- The Youthful Warrior (2004) Twinkle
- Songs of Glory/Pieśni chwały (Warsaw 2008) - (with Trebunie Tutki)
- Repent (2008), Sip a Cup
- Praises to the King (2009) Reggae on Top
- Culture Defender (2011) Gussie P Music
- Gift of Jah (2011) Twinkle
- Bribery And Corruption (2012) Twinkle
- Bunker Buster (2012) Twinkle
- Glimmer Of Hope (2012) Twinkle
- Do It Again (2019) Twinkle
- Pass It On (2019) Twinkle

== Members ==
Current members

- Norman Grant – Vocals (1962–present)
- Ralston Grant – Vocals, Rhythm guitar (1962–present)
- Dub Judah – Bass (1990–present)
- Black Steel – Guitar (1986–present)
- Jerry Lions – Guitar (1987–present)
- Derek "Demondo" Fevrier – Engineer (1986–present)
- Barry Prince – Drums (2004–present)
- Aron Shamash – Keyboards (2004–present)
