= Gmina Biały Dunajec =

Gmina Biały Dunajec Biały Dunajec Commune
- Gmina
- Coat of arms
- Interactive map of Gmina Biały Dunajec
- Coordinates (Biały Dunajec): 49°22′28″N 20°0′32″E
- Country: Poland
- Voivodeship: Lesser Poland
- County: Tatra
- Seat: Biały Dunajec

Area
  - Total: 35.51 km^{2} (13.71 sq mi)

Population (2006)
  - Total: 6,780
  - Density: 191/km^{2} (495/sq mi)

Gmina Biały Dunajec is a rural gmina (administrative district) in Tatra County, Lesser Poland Voivodeship, in southern Poland. Its seat is the village of Biały Dunajec, which lies approximately 10 kilometres (6 mi) north-east of Zakopane and 77 km (48 mi) south of the regional capital Kraków.

The gmina covers an area of 35.51 square kilometres (13.7 sq mi), and as of 2006 its total population is 6,780.

== Villages ==
Gmina Biały Dunajec contains the villages and settlements of Biały Dunajec, Gliczarów Dolny, Gliczarów Górny, Leszczyny and Sierockie.

== Neighbouring gminas ==
Gmina Biały Dunajec is bordered by the gminas of Bukowina Tatrzańska, Czarny Dunajec, Poronin and Szaflary.
