= Małe Ciche =

- Village
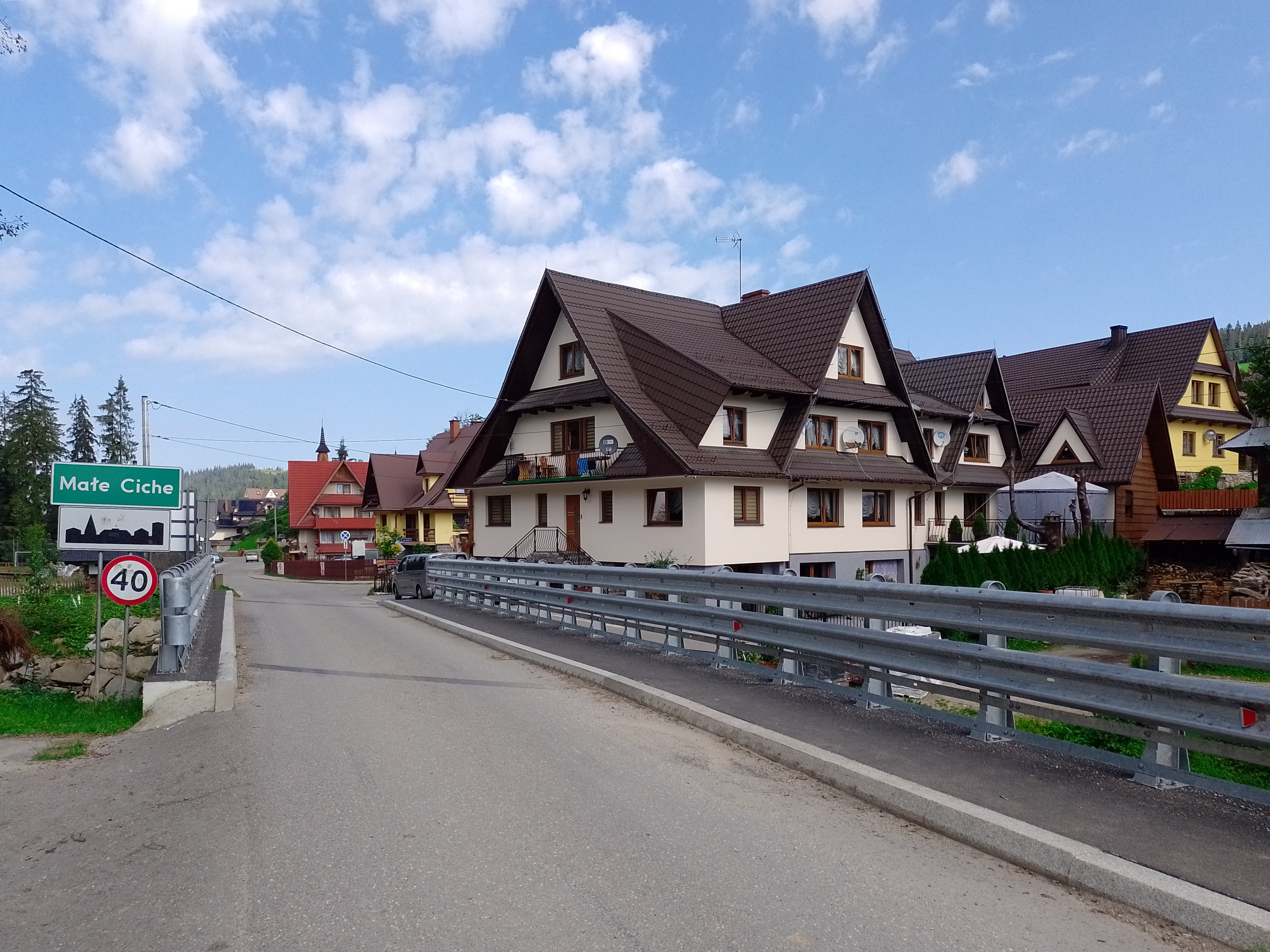
- General view
- Interactive map of Małe Ciche
- Location within Poland
- Coordinates: 49°18′12″N 20°4′22″E
- Country: Poland
- Voivodeship: Lesser Poland
- County: Tatra
- Gmina: Poronin
- Elevation: 830 m (2,720 ft)
- Population: 400

Małe Ciche [ˈmawɛ ˈt͡ɕixɛ], (Slovak: Malé Tiché) is a village and a ski resort, in the administrative district of Gmina Poronin, within Tatra County, Lesser Poland Voivodeship, in southern Poland.

The village has a population of 400.

== See also ==
- Podhale
