= Trebunie-Tutki =

Polish folk music group

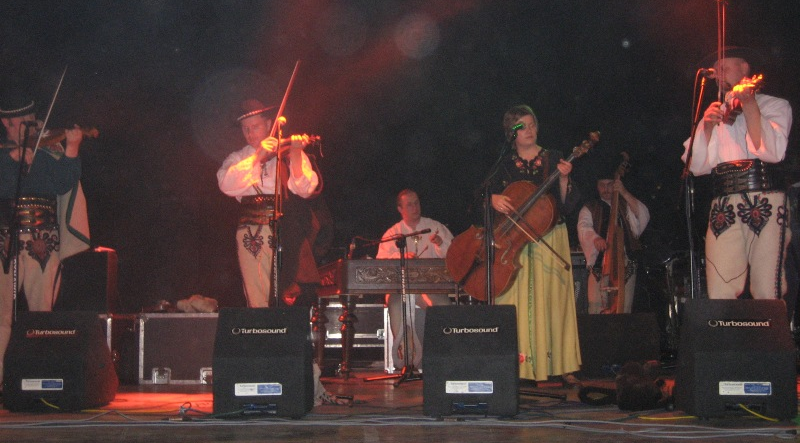

Background information
- Origin: Biały Dunajec, Poland
- Genres: Polish folk
- Members: Krzysztof Trebunia-Tutka; Anna Trebunia-Tutka; Other members of the extended memory
- Website: trebunie.pl

Trebunie-Tutki is a folk musical group consisting of a family of musicians originating from Biały Dunajec village near Zakopane, Poland. Though there are many members of the extended family that play music, the core musicians are Krzysztof (violin & vocals) and Anna (basy & vocals).

They collaborated with the Jamaican reggae band Twinkle Brothers, in which the two groups combine traditional mountain music of the Polish górale with reggae.

The group calls their music style "disco z pola" ("disco from the fields"), a pun with the name of the Polish pop-music style disco polo.

== Recognition ==
In 2008 the members of the band received the title of "Honorary Ambassadors of the Polish Language" from the Council of the Polish Language.

In 2010 their album Pieśni chwały (Songs of Glory) was certified gold in Poland.

== Discography ==
1. Żywot Janicka Zbójnika ("Life of Janosik the Robber"), produced by Gamma, Kraków 1992
2. Higher Heights (with Twinkle Brothers), prod. Twinkle Music, London 1992, prod. Kamahuk, Warszawa 1993
3. Baciarujciez chłopcy, prod. Stebo, Kraków 1993
4. Zagrojcie dudzicki, prod. Stebo, Kraków 1993
5. Kolędy góralskie, prod. Folk, Zakopane 1993
6. Ballada o śmierci Janosika ("Ballad on the Death of Janosik"), prod. Folk, Zakopane 1993
7. Folk karnawał I, prod. Folk, Zakopane 1993
8. Folk karnawał II, prod. Folk, Zakopane 1994
9. Górale na wesoło, prod. Folk, Zakopane 1994
10. Come Back Twinkle to Trebunia Family (with Twinkle Brothers, prod. Kamahuk, W-wa 1994
11. Śpiewki i nuty, prod. Folk, Zakopane 1994
12. Music of The Tatra Mountains - The Trebunia Family, prod. Nimbus Records, London 1995
13. Saga, MC prod. Folk, Zakopane 1996
14. Kolędy góralskie, ed. II, prod. Folk, Zakopane 1996
15. Janosik w Sherwood, prod. Kamahuk, Warszawa 1996
16. Greatest Hits, prod. Kamahuk, Warszawa 1997
17. Góral-ska Apo-Calypso, prod. Folk, Zakopane 1998
18. Podniesienie, prod. Kamahuk, Warszawa 1998
19. Jubileusz z Warszawskim Chórem Międzyuczelnianym
20. Etno-Techno, prod. Folk, Zakopane 2000
21. Best Dub, prod. Kamahuk, Warszawa 2000
22. Folk Karnawał, prod. Folk, Zakopane 2000
23. Złota Kolekcja, prod. Pomaton EMI, Warszawa 2001
24. Baciarujciez chłopcy, ed. II, prod. Folk, Zakopane 2001
25. Zagrojcie dudzicki, ed. II, prod. Folk, Zakopane 2001
26. Ballada o śmieci Janosika, ed. II, Folk, Zakopane 1993-2005
27. Góralsko siła, F.F. FOLK, Zakopane, 2006
28. Tischner - Trebunie-Tutki + Voo Voo-nootki, 2007
29. Songs of Glory/Pieśni chwały - Tebunie-Tutki + Twinkle Brothers, Warszawa 2008
