= Murzasichle =

- Village
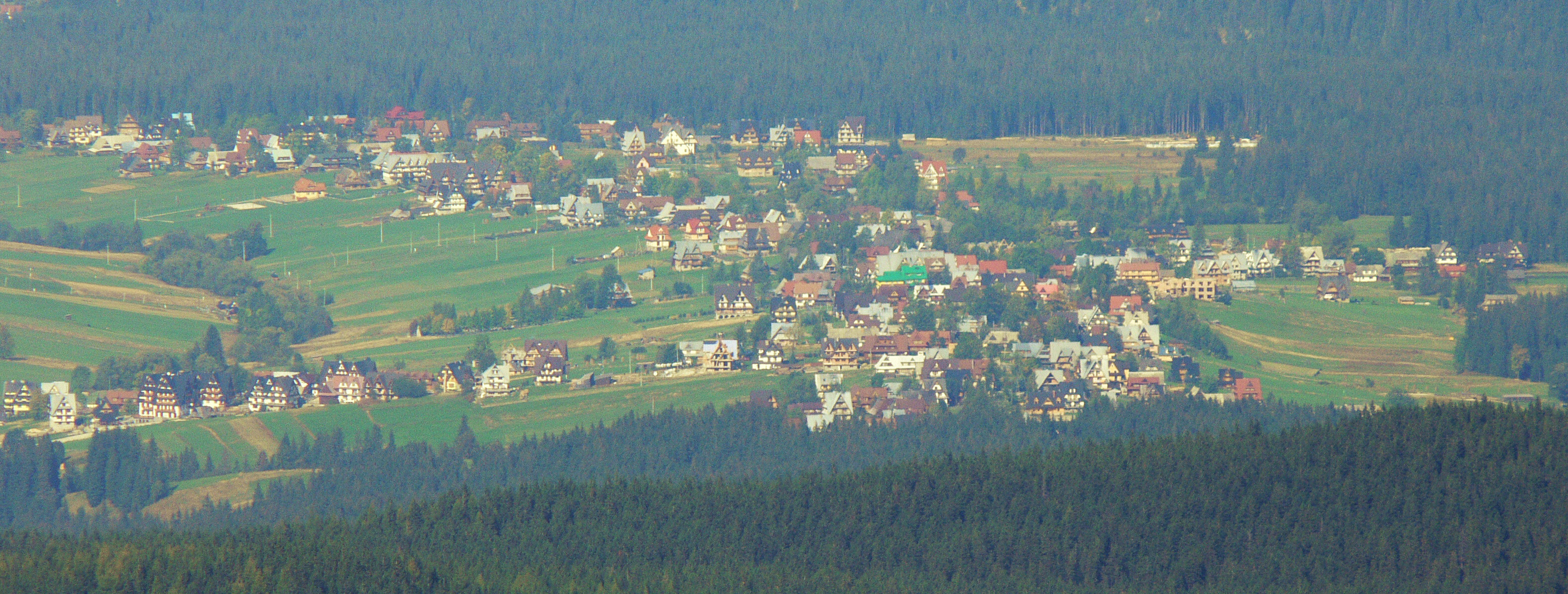
- Murzasichle from Kościelec mountain

- Location within Poland
- Coordinates: 49°18′42″N 20°2′37″E
- Country: Poland
- Voivodeship: Lesser Poland
- County: Tatra
- Gmina: Poronin
- Highest elevation: 950 m (3,120 ft)
- Lowest elevation: 820 m (2,690 ft)
- Population: 1,100
- Website: http://www.murzasichle.info

Murzasichle [ˈmur zaˈɕixlɛ] is a village in the administrative district of Gmina Poronin, within Tatra County, Lesser Poland Voivodeship, in southern Poland.

The village name came from the merging of the names of two settlements: Mur and Zasichle. The village is a part of the Podhale region and is inhabited by Gorals.
