= Gmina Poronin =

Gmina Poronin Poronin Commune
- Gmina
- Coat of arms
- Interactive map of Gmina Poronin
- Coordinates (Poronin): 49°20′40″N 20°0′23″E
- Country: Poland
- Voivodeship: Lesser Poland
- County: Tatra
- Seat: Poronin

Area
  - Total: 83.55 km^{2} (32.26 sq mi)

Population (2006)
  - Total: 10,706
  - Density: 128.1/km^{2} (331.9/sq mi)
- Website: http://www.poronin.pl/

Gmina Poronin is a rural gmina (administrative district) in Tatra County, Lesser Poland Voivodeship, in southern Poland. Its seat is the village of Poronin, which lies approximately 7 kilometres (4 mi) north-east of Zakopane and 80 km (50 mi) south of the regional capital Kraków.

The gmina covers an area of 83.55 square kilometres (32.3 sq mi), and as of 2006 its total population is 10,706.

== Villages ==
Gmina Poronin contains the villages and settlements of Bustryk, Małe Ciche, Murzasichle, Nowe Bystre, Suche and Ząb.

== Neighbouring gminas ==
Gmina Poronin is bordered by the town of Zakopane and by the gminas of Biały Dunajec, Bukowina Tatrzańska, Czarny Dunajec and Kościelisko.
