= Nowe Bystre =

- Village
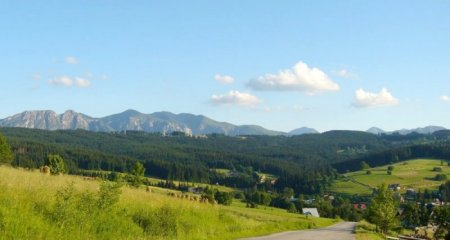
- Nowe Bystre

- Location within Poland
- Coordinates: 49°20′25″N 19°55′22″E
- Country: Poland
- Voivodeship: Lesser Poland
- County: Tatra
- Gmina: Poronin
- Highest elevation: 960 m (3,150 ft)
- Lowest elevation: 800 m (2,600 ft)
- Population: 1,200
- Website: http://www.nowebystre.pl

Nowe Bystre [ˈnɔvɛ ˈbɨstrɛ] is a village in the administrative district of Gmina Poronin, within Tatra County, Lesser Poland Voivodeship, in southern Poland.
