= E.T. Webster =

Jamaican reggae singer

- Born: Errol Webster c.1945 Montego Bay, Jamaica
- Genres: Reggae
- Years active: 1960s–present
- Labels: Twinkle, Runn, Mr & Ms

Errol "E.T." Webster (born c. 1945) is a Jamaican reggae singer active since the 1960s, but best known for his roots reggae releases since the 1980s.

== Biography ==
Born in Montego Bay, Webster began singing in the 1960s and joined Billy Vernon and the Celestials in 1967 after a successful audition. The group toured the North coast hotel circuit in Jamaica and Webster also toured California with the band in 1969, and provided lead vocals on the band's debut album. In the 1970s he was a member of the New Breed and began a solo career, becoming a popular cabaret artist.

Webster's best known work is his material recorded since the mid-1980s including the Jamaican number one single "Can We Meet" and work with producers Norman Grant of the Twinkle Brothers and later Ocho Rios-based Barry O'Hare, which has resulted in several albums, primarily comprising roots reggae.

Webster suffered a stroke in 2008, which restricted his movement and he now uses a wheelchair. He has continued to record, including the Inner Path album in 2011. He was honoured at the 2011 Reggae Sumfest festival with the 'Reggae Icon' award.

== Discography ==
- Hit A-Boom (1984), Twinkle
- Music is Life (1987), Sonic Sounds
- Musical Explosion (1990), Sonic Sounds
- Twinkle Sample volume 1 (1990), Twinkle – split with Twinkle Brothers
- Twinkle Sample volume 2 (1990), Twinkle – split with Twinkle Brothers
- Changes (1990), Twinkle
- Reflections (1993), Imp
- Lament of a Dread (1993), Twinkle
- Mankind (1996), Twinkle
- Freedom Fighter (1998), Runn
- Colour You (2002), Mr & Ms
- Inner Path (2010), Mr & Ms
- Sings Golden Hits (2011), Mr & Ms
