= Lake Kurtkowiec =

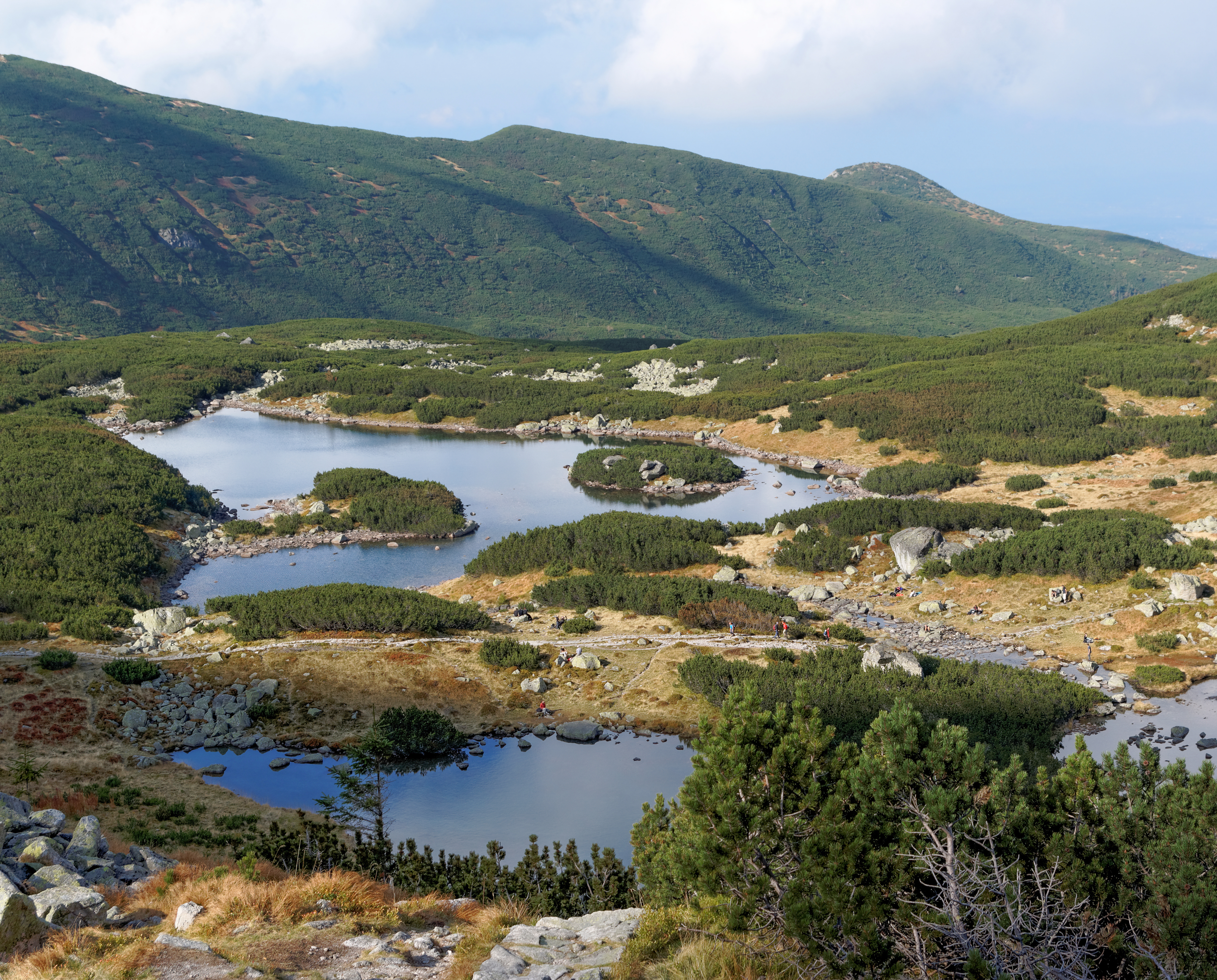
- Lake Kurtkowiec in the background

- Location within Lesser Poland Voivodeship
- Coordinates: 49°13′46″N 20°00′14″E
- Type: lake
- Basin countries: Poland
- Max. length: 0.212 km (0.132 mi)
- Max. width: 0.139 km (0.086 mi)
- Surface area: 1.536 km^{2} (0.593 sq mi)
- Max. depth: 4.8 m (16 ft)
- Water volume: 12,967,000 m^{3} (10,513 acre⋅ft)
- Surface elevation: 1,686 m (5,531 ft)

Lake Kurtkowiec is an oligotrophic lake, part of the Gąsienicowe Ponds (Polish: Gąsienicowe Stawy), located in the Tatra Mountains in Poland. The lake is located in the western part of the Gąsienicowa Valley, at an elevation of 1,686 metres (5,531 ft).
