= Ząb, Lesser Poland Voivodeship =

Ząb
- Village
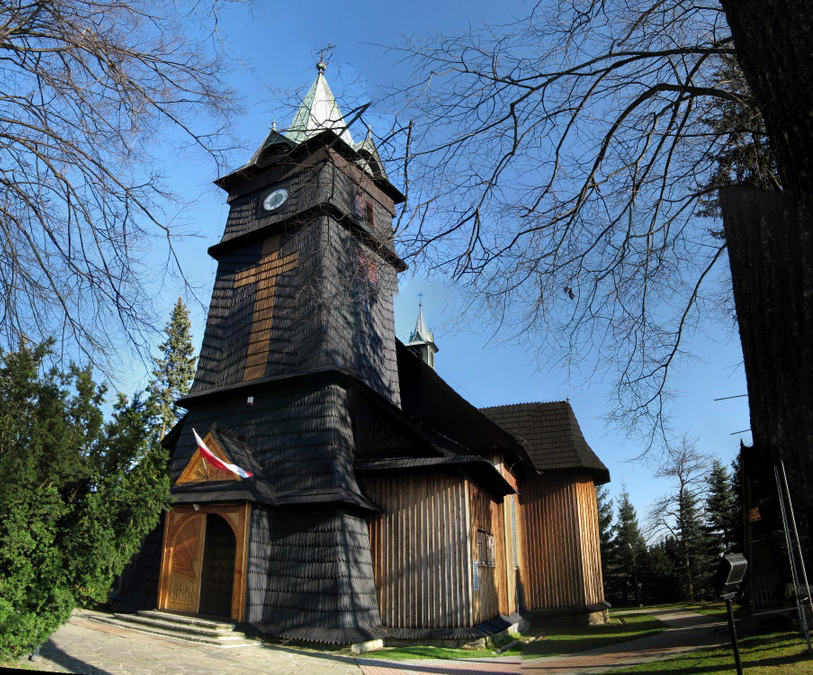
- Church of Saint Anne

- Location within Poland
- Coordinates: 49°20′10″N 19°56′51″E
- Country: Poland
- Voivodeship: Lesser Poland
- County: Tatra
- Gmina: Poronin
- Elevation: 1,013 m (3,323 ft)

Population
  - Total: 2,300

Ząb [zɔmp] (until 1965 Zubsuche) is a village in the administrative district of Gmina Poronin, within Tatra County, Lesser Poland Voivodeship, in southern Poland.

It is Poland's highest village by elevation, at 1,013 metres (3,323 ft) above sea level.

== Notable people ==
- Stanisław Bobak, Polish ski jumper
- Józef Łuszczek, Polish cross-country skier
- Kamil Stoch, Polish ski jumper
