= Biały Dunajec =

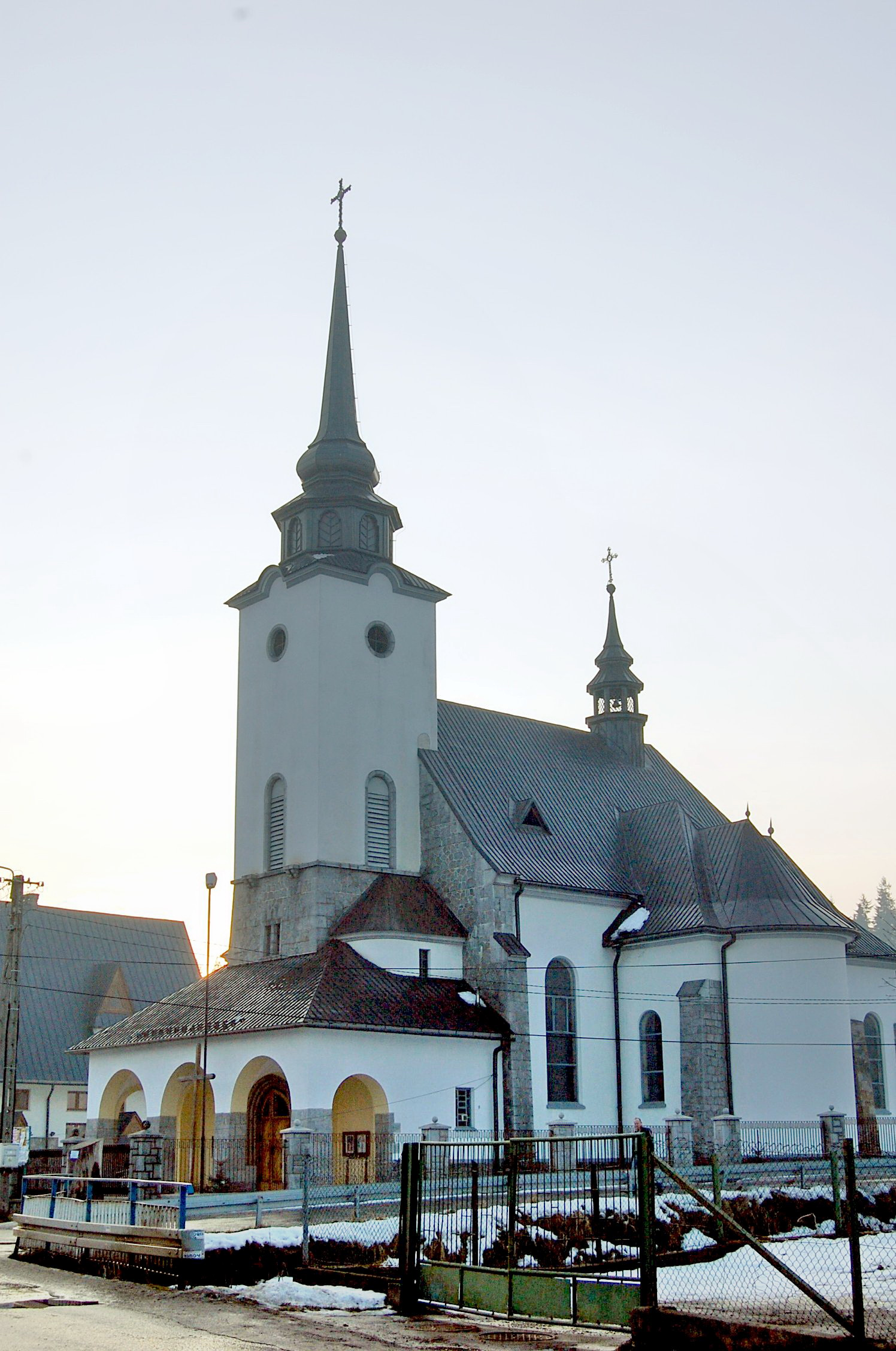
- Local Catholic church

- Location within Poland
- Coordinates: 49°22′28″N 20°00′32″E
- Country: Poland
- Voivodeship: Lesser Poland
- County: Tatra
- Gmina: Biały Dunajec

Government
  - Vogt: Andrzej Jacek Nowak

Population (2006)
  - Total: 4,200
- Time zone: UTC+1 (CET)
  - Summer (DST): UTC+2 (CEST)
- Postal code: 34-425
- Area code: +48 18
- Car plates: KTT

Biały Dunajec [ˈbjawɨ duˈnajɛt͡s], is a village in southern Poland situated in the Lesser Poland Voivodeship since 1999; it was previously in Nowy Sącz Voivodeship from 1975 to 1998.

== Notable residents ==
- Trebunie-Tutki
