= Tatra County =

Tatra County Powiat tatrzański
- County
- Flag Coat of arms

- Location within the voivodeship
- Coordinates (Zakopane): 49°18′N 19°57′E
- Country: Poland
- Voivodeship: Lesser Poland
- Seat: Zakopane
- Gminas: Total 5 (incl. 1 urban): Zakopane; Gmina Biały Dunajec; Gmina Bukowina Tatrzańska; Gmina Kościelisko; Gmina Poronin

Area
  - Total: 471.62 km^{2} (182.09 sq mi)

Population (2006)
  - Total: 65,393
  - Density: 138.66/km^{2} (359.12/sq mi)
  - Urban: 27,486
  - Rural: 37,907
- Car plates: KTT
- Website: https://www.powiat.tatry.pl

Tatra County (Polish: powiat tatrzański) is a unit of territorial administration and local government (powiat) in Lesser Poland Voivodeship, southern Poland, on the Slovak border. It came into being on January 1, 1999, as a result of the Polish local government reforms passed in 1998. Its administrative seat and only town is Zakopane, which lies 85 kilometres (53 mi) south of the regional capital Kraków. The county takes its name from the Tatra mountain range, which covers most of its territory.

The county covers an area of 471.62 square kilometres (182.1 sq mi). As of 2006 its total population is 65,393, out of which the population of Zakopane is 27,486 and the rural population is 37,907.

The mountainous southern part of the county (211 km^{2}) makes up the Tatra National Park. This area, together with the Slovak Tatra National Park across the border, make up a UNESCO-designated biosphere reserve.

== Neighbouring counties ==
Tatra County is bordered by only one other Polish county, Nowy Targ County, which lies to the north. To the east, west and south it is bordered by Slovakia (namely, Tvrdošín and Liptovský Mikuláš Districts in Žilina Region to the south and west, and Poprad District in Prešov Region to the south and east).

== Administrative division ==
The county is subdivided into five gminas (one urban and four rural). These are listed in the following table, in descending order of population.

Gmina	Type	Area (km^{2})	Population (2006)	Seat
Zakopane	urban	84.0	27,486
Gmina Bukowina Tatrzańska	rural	131.8	12,386	Bukowina Tatrzańska
Gmina Poronin	rural	83.6	10,706	Poronin
Gmina Kościelisko	rural	136.4	8,035	Kościelisko
Gmina Biały Dunajec	rural	35.5	6,780	Biały Dunajec

== See also ==
- Małe Ciche
