= Rafał Królikowski =

Polish actor (born 1966)

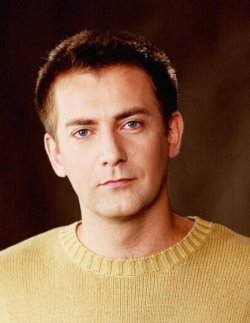
- Rafał Królikowski, 2008
- Born: 27 December 1966 (age 59); Zduńska Wola, Poland
- Education: National Academy of Dramatic Art in Warsaw
- Occupation: Actor
- Years active: 1991–present

Rafał Królikowski (born 27 December 1966, Zduńska Wola) is a Polish film, television and theatre actor.

== Life and career ==
He was born on 27 December 1966 in Zduńska Wola. In 1992, he graduated from the National Academy of Dramatic Art in Warsaw. He made his film debut in Andrzej Wajda's 1992 film Pierścionek z orłem w koronie (The Crowned-Eagle Ring) for which he was awarded the Zbigniew Cybulski Award for best young actor. Other notable films that he appeared in include Paweł Komorowski's 2000 film Syzyfowe prace (The Labors of Sisyphus), a film adaptation of Stefan Żeromski's novel of the same name; Andrzej Wajda's 2002 film The Revenge which is a film adaptation of Aleksander Fredro's drama Zemsta; and Władysław Pasikowski's 2019 film Kurier, which tells the story of journalist and resistance fighter Jan Nowak-Jeziorański.

Apart from his film roles, he also appeared in numerous TV series such as M jak miłość, Hotel 52, Na dobre i na złe, Prawo Agaty and Ojciec Mateusz.

His career in theatre involves collaborating with such theatres as Zygmunt Hubner Theatre, the Polish Theatre and the Warsaw Chamber Opera.

== Personal life ==
In 1995 he married Dorota Mirska with whom he has two sons: Piotr (born 1998) and Michał (born 2002).

== Filmography ==
- 1992: Pierścionek z orłem w koronie as Marcin and Andrzej
- 1993: 20 lat później as Wolf Hauser (Karl Klepacz)
- 1993: Pożegnanie z Marią as Skrzypek
- 1994: Legenda Tatr as Andrzej
- 1995: Dzieje mistrza Twardowskiego as Balan devil
- 1997: Klan as Janusz Sowiński (cameo)
- 1997: Przystań as Jan
- 1998: Syzyfowe prace as Albert (episode 3)
- 1999: Miodowe lata as the boss (episode 18)
- 1999: Palce lizać as Rysio Wiatr
- 2000: Syzyfowe prace as Albert, friend of the Płoniewicz family
- 2000: Na dobre i na złe as Tadeusz Świderski, Michał's father (episode 38)
- 2001: Przeprowadzki as Franciszek Flatau (episode 9)
- 2001: Garderoba damska as Wiesiek (episode 9)
- 2001: The Hexer as King Niedamir
- 2001-2002: M jak miłość as Konrad Badecki
- 2003: Superprodukcja as Yanek Drzazga
- 2002: The Revenge as Wacław
- 2002: The Hexer as King Niedamir (episode 4)
- 2003: Ciało as Wolter
- 2003: Psie serce as Tomek, Anna's boyfriend (episode 10)
- 2004: Trzeci as the Toyota guy
- 2004: Talki z resztą as Kazik
- 2004: Nigdy w życiu! as editor-in-chief
- 2005-2006: Tango z aniołem as Mikołaj Brzozowski
- 2005-2008: Egzamin z życia as Radek Drawski
- 2006-2007: Pogoda na piątek as Artur Kaliski
- 2007: Ryś as Garnitur
- 2007-2008: Niania as Maks's brother
- 2008: Hotel pod żyrafą i nosorożcem as Miłobędzki, Ola's father
- 2008: Lejdis as Tomek
- 2008: Teraz albo nigdy! as Michał
- 2008: Kochaj i tańcz as a journalist
- 2010-2013: Hotel 52 as concierge Michał Horwat
- 2011: Usta usta as Marek
- 2012: Prawo Agaty as Marcin Kos (episode 17)
- 2012: Być jak Kazimierz Deyna as editor-in-chief
- 2013: Komisarz Alex as professor Marek Antoniewicz (episode 39)
- 2013: Podejrzani zakochani as Stanisław Tarkowski vel Alex Braun and Oleg Kaługin
- 2014: Sama słodycz as Dziubek, partner Marty (episodes 3 and 13)
- 2014: Czas honoru. Powstanie as Ernst von Hackel, Obergruppenführer Waffen-SS
- 2014: O mnie się nie martw as Artur Ostrowski (episodes 7-9)
- 2015: Ojciec Mateusz as professor Bartosz Feldrecht (episode 174)
- 2016: Druga szansa as Jakub Zeit
- 2017: Marszałek as Bolesław Wieniawa-Długoszowski
- 2019: Kurier as General Stanisław Tatar

== See also ==
- Polish cinema
- Polish Film Awards
