= Labors of Sisyphus =

The Labors of Sisyphus may refer to

- The Greek myth of Sisyphus
- The 1897 novel by Stefan Żeromski Syzyfowe prace.
