= Przemysław Sadowski =

Polish actor (born 1975)

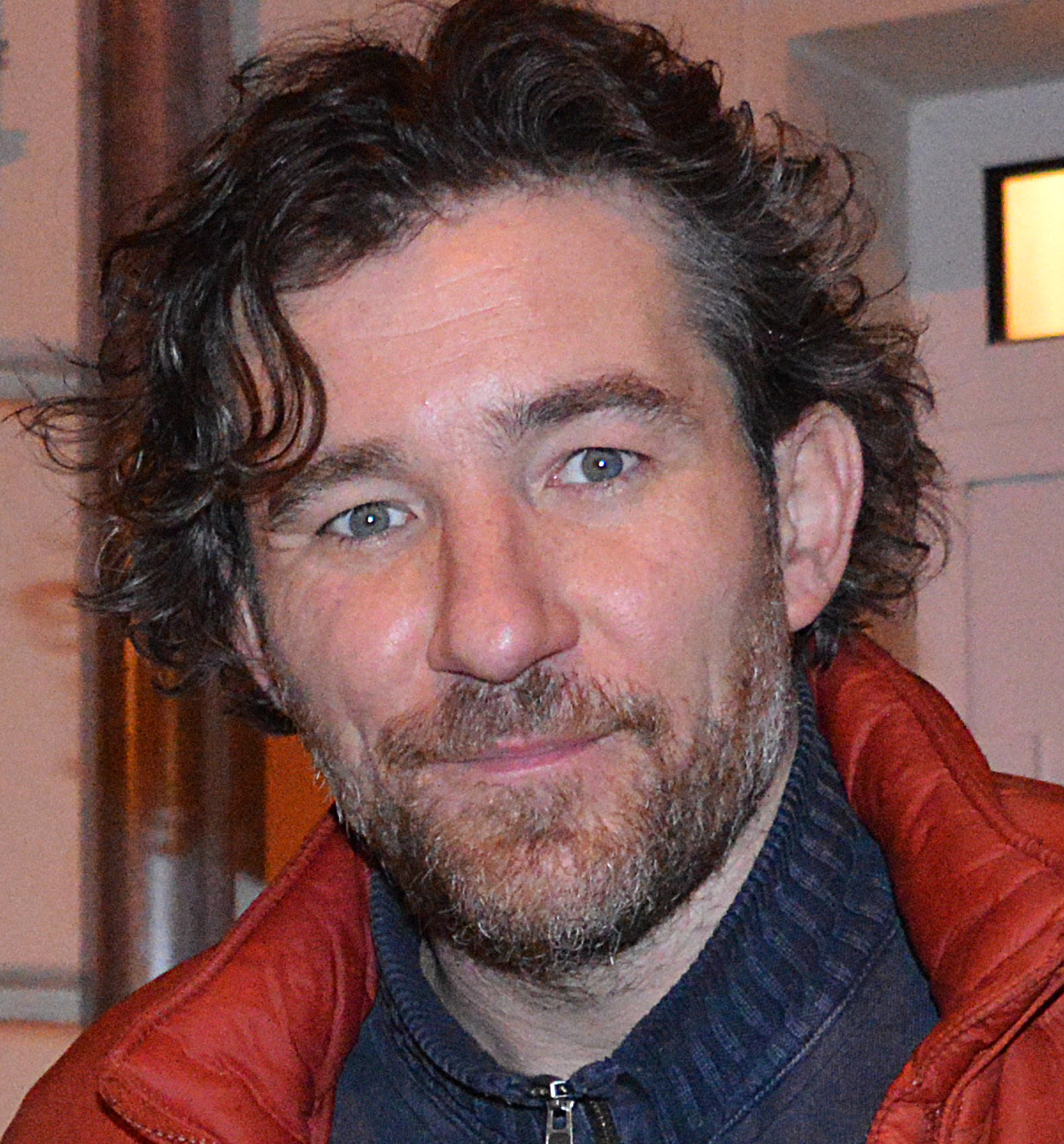
- Born: March 18, 1975 (age 51); Hajnówka, Poland
- Education: National Film School in Łódź
- Occupation: Actor
- Years active: 1997-present
- Spouse: Agnieszka Warchulska
- Children: Jan, Franciszek and Małgorzata

Przemysław Sadowski (born March 18, 1975) is a Polish actor.

== Biography ==
He was born in Hajnówka, but grew up in Białystok. He participated first degree music school in piano and guitar. Before he completed his studies in 1999 at the National Film School in Łódź, he debuted first on scene in the role as an Elf in a performance entitled A Midsummer Night's Dream in Stefan Jaracz's Theatre, which he participated between 1997 and 1999. He later performed in theatres: Polskim w Szczecin(2000), Scena Prezentacje in Warsaw (2000, 2002 to 2004), Nowym Praga (2005) and Tadeusz Łomnicki's Na Woli (2006).

In 2000 for the first time he played roles in four different films: Syzyfowe prace, Pierwszy Milion, Strefa ciszy and Enduro Bojz. After playing several roles in television dramas like Więzy krwi (2001), Zostać miss (2001), Klan (2001 to 2002) and Na dobre i na złe (2002) he became the college love in TVN's Magda M..

In 2006 he took part in the fourth edition of Taniec z gwiazdami, in which he achieved fourth place and where his dancing partner was Ewa Szabatin.

On September 4, 2004 he married actress Agnieszka Warchulska, with whom he has two sons – Jan (born 2005) and Franciszek (born 2011). He also has a daughter, Małgorzata (born 1997) from a previous relationship.

== Filmography ==
Films

- Syzyfowe prace as an assistant
- Pierwszy milion as Jacek Berger Kurczewski "Kurtz"
- Strefa ciszy as a French
- Enduro Bojz as a Soviet
- Where Eskimos Live as escapee
- In Desert and Wilderness (2001 film) as a Major
- Reich as a drug dealer
- Julie Walking Home as a wounded man
- Siedem grzechów popcooltury as Max
- Tylko mnie kochaj as a police officer
- Outlanders as Jan Jasiński
- Droga do kraju as Mirek
- Cisza as Tadeusz Brzozowski
- Siedem minut as Piotr Winkler
- Układ zamknięty as Marek Stawski
- Tajemnica Westerplatte as Piotr Buder
- Run Boy Run as Kowalski

=== Television Films ===
- Polonaise as Maciek

=== Television Drama Soaps ===
- Syzyfowe prace as an assistant
- Mordziaki as a policeman (episode 8)
- Pierwszy milion − as Jacek Berger Kurczewski "Kurtz"
- Klan − as doctor Łukasz Kobielski
- Zostać miss as Artur "Arczi"
- Więzy krwi as Łukasz Bronowicz, Józef's son, forester
- W pustyni i w puszczy as Major
- Na dobre i na złe as Piotr Michałowski (episode 87)
- Samo Życie as Kacper Szpunar
- Fala zbrodni as Budrys
- Sublokatorzy as an agent (episode. 1)
- Pensjonat pod Różą as Gabriel (episode 3); Kacper, Mai's husband (episode 64)
- Bulionerzy as Damian Berger
- Magda M. as Filip Starski as Magda's true college love
- Kryminalni as Artur Zimak, Auguścików's neighbour (episode 46)
- Ranczo as Arkadiusz Stolarkiewicz vel Jan Kowalski (episode 22 to 24)
- Niania as Paweł Walicki (episode 67)
- Determinator as Cezary Bogucki
- Londyńczycy as Darek
- Naznaczony as Eryk, Mileny's brother
- Usta usta as Robert Langer
- Czas honoru as the representative of The Main Station Of The ZWZ, chief of the second region II KG ZWZ (episode 39); Brodowicz (for fourth and fifth series)
- Duch w dom as Jurek (episode 4)
- Hotel 52 as Błażej, Andrzej's friend
- Prawo Agaty as Arkadiusz Jezierski (episode 25)
- Na krawędzi as Andrzej Czyż
- Ja to mam szczęście as Stefan, Joanny's former husband
- Komisarz Alex as Artur Hoffer (episode 24)
- 2XL as Karol Zabawski, Laura's husband
