= Bust of Stefan Żeromski =

Sculpture in Warsaw, Poland

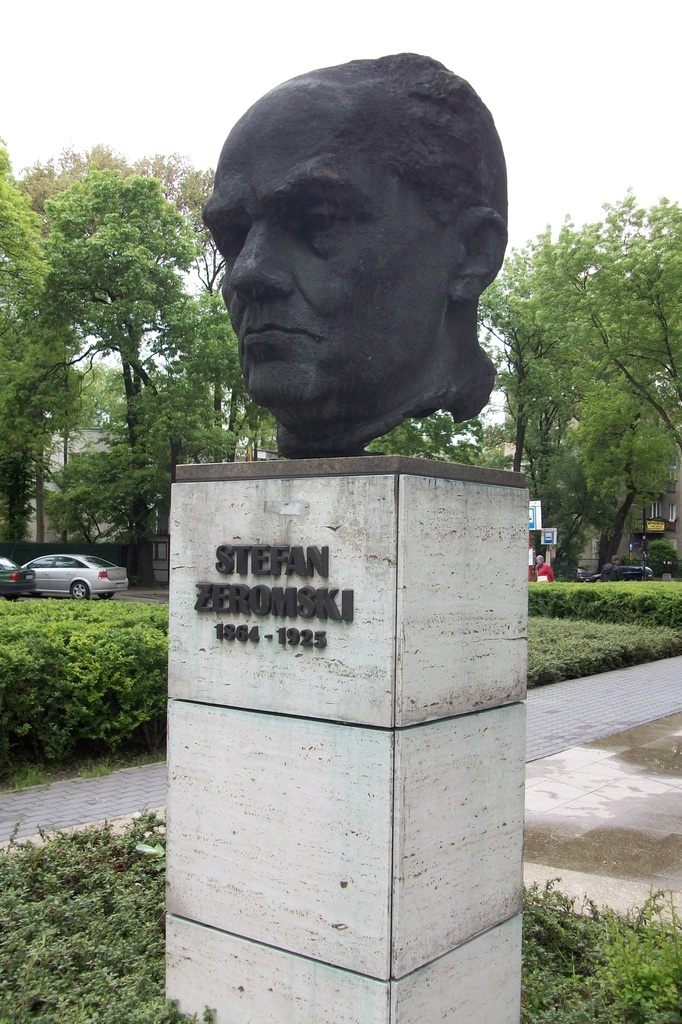
- The sculpture in 2010.
- Interactive map of Bust of Stefan Żeromski
- Location: 28 Alliance Square, Praga-South, Warsaw, Poland
- Coordinates: 52°13′53.20″N 21°03′22.55″E
- Designer: Stanisław Sikora
- Type: Bust
- Material: Bronze
- Opening date: 16 September 1987
- Dedicated to: Stefan Żeromski

The bust of Stefan Żeromski (Polish pronunciation: [ˈstɛ.fan ʐɛˈrɔm.ski]; Polish: popiersie Stefana Żeromskiego) is a monument in the city of Warsaw, Poland, in the neighbourhood of Saska Kępa, within the Praga-South district. It is placed placed at 28 Alliance Square near the corer with Zwycięzców Street. It commemorates Stefan Żeromski, a 19th- and 20th-century novelist and dramatist. The monument has the form of a large bronze sculpture of Żeromski's head, placed on top of a pedestal. It was designed by Stanisław Sikora, and unveiled on 16 September 1987.

== History ==
The sculpture was designed by Stanisław Sikora, and unveiled at the Alliance Square on 16 September 1987. It was placed in front of cinema Sawa. Following its deconstruction in the year 2000, the sculpture was removed. It was again placed at the square in 2001, being moved several meters from its previous location.

== Characteristics ==
The monument is placed in front of an apartment building at 28 Alliance Square, near the corer with Zwycięzców Street. It has a form of a large bronze sculpture of Stefan Żeromski's head, placed on top of a pedestal. It bares an iscription which reads: "Stefan Żeromski; 1864–1925".
