= Jaworzynka Valley =

Valley in the Western Tatras, Poland

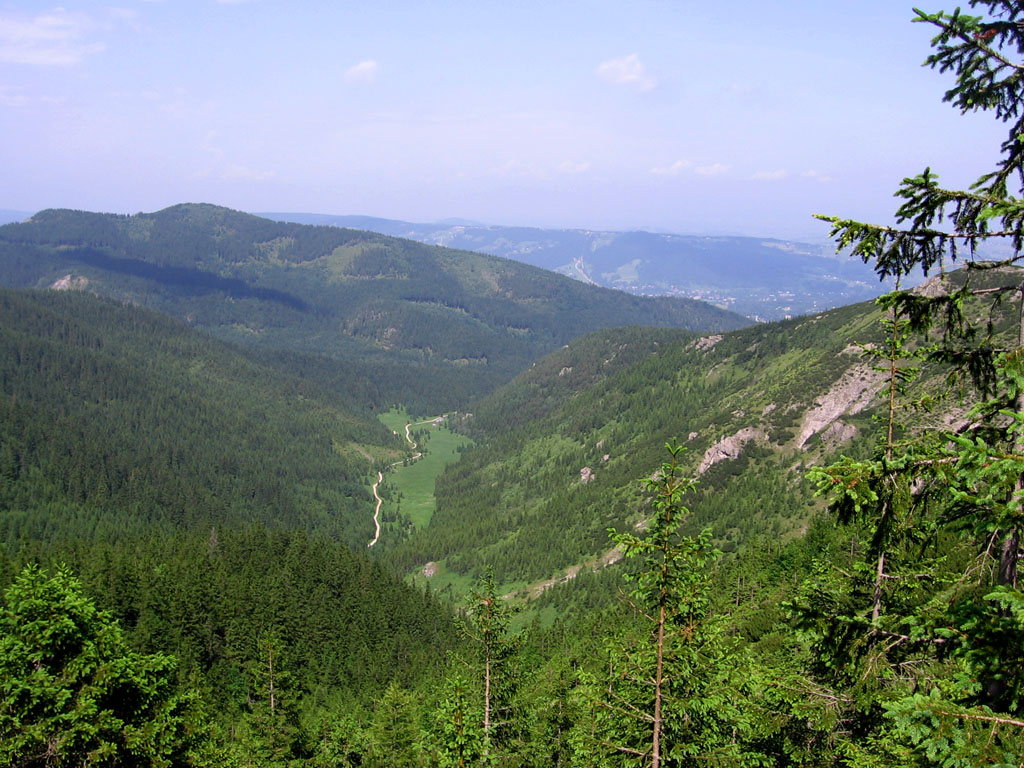
- View of Jaworzynka from Przełęcz między Kopami

- Location within Poland

Geology
- Type: Valley

Geography
- Country: Poland
- State/Province: Lesser Poland Voivodeship
- Coordinates: 49°15′47″N 19°59′10″E
- Interactive map of Jaworzynka Valley

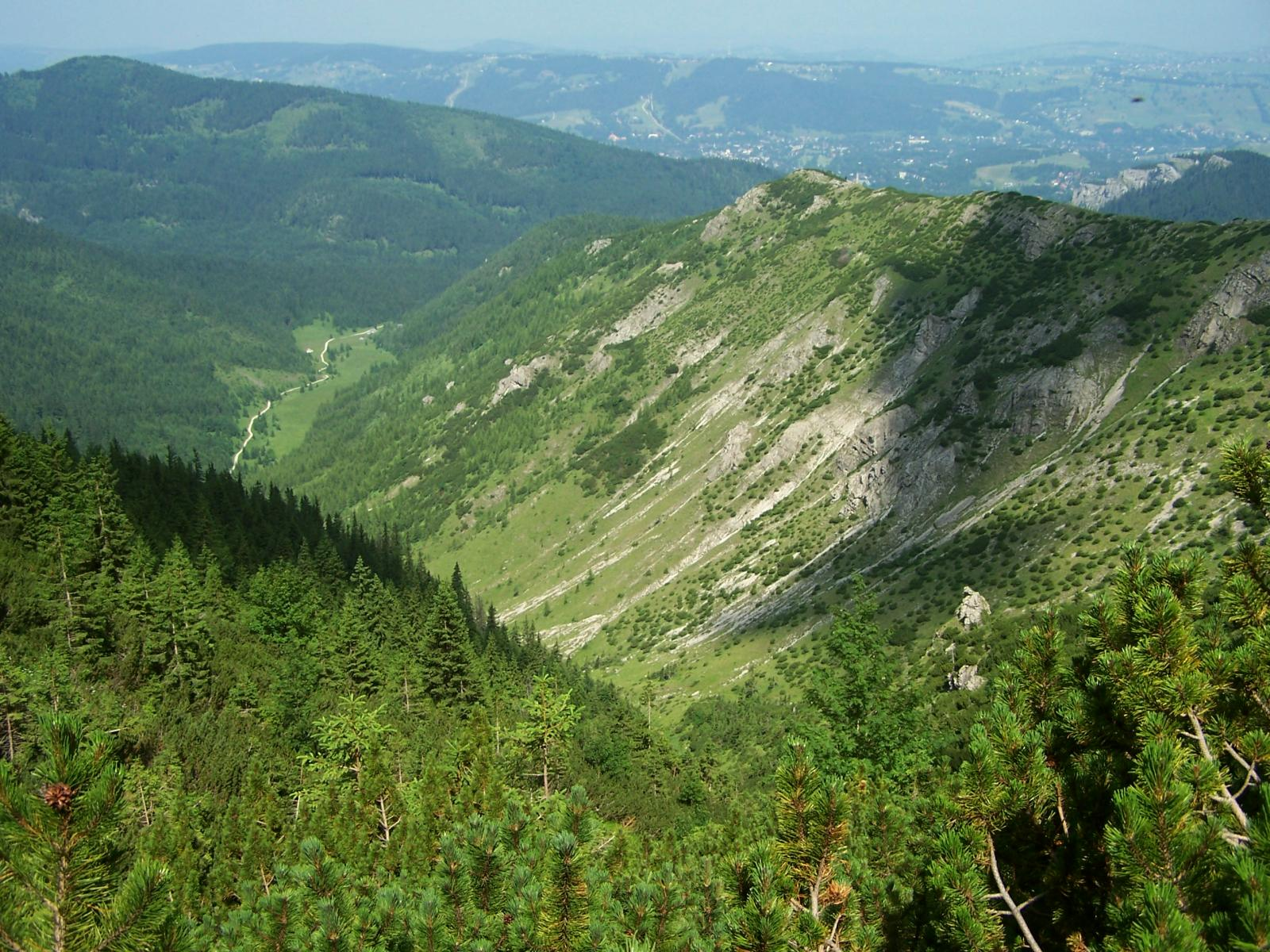
Jaworzynka Valley – eroded eastern slopes now largely covered with vegetation

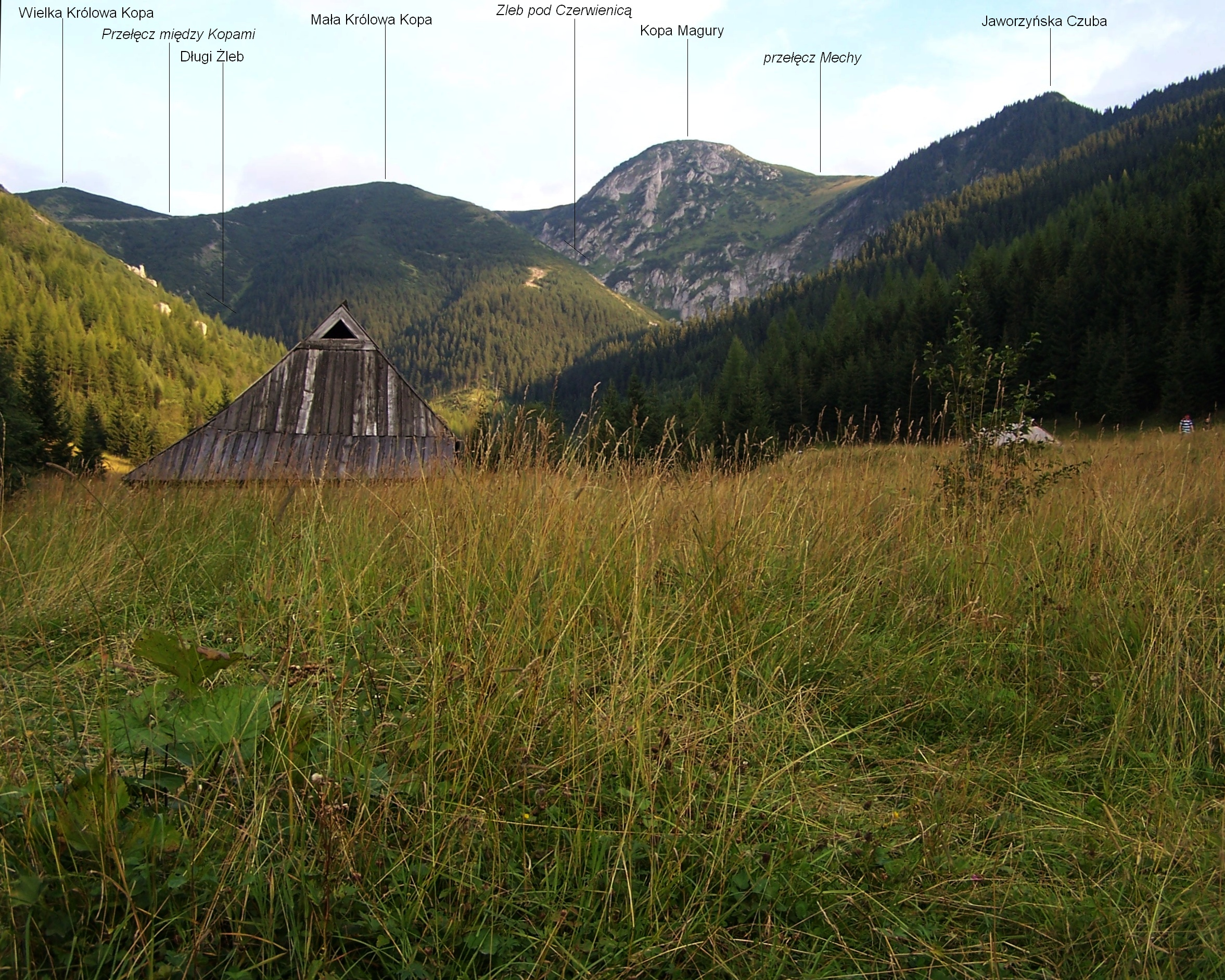
View up the valley from Jaworzynka Polana

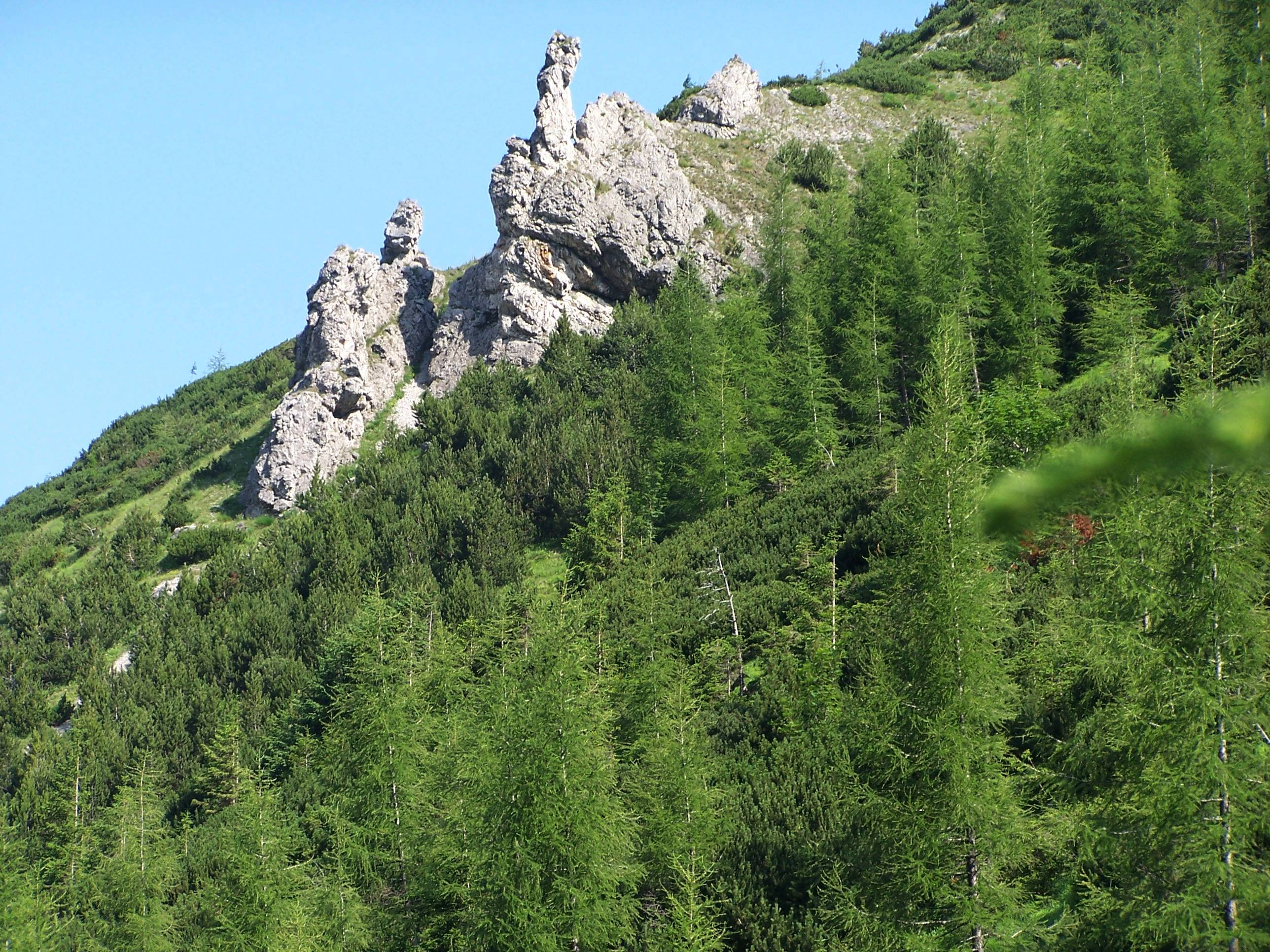
Limestone rock formation Mnich on the right slope

Jaworzynka is a valley in the Tatra Mountains, forming the eastern branch of Bystra Valley.

== Topography ==
Jaworzynka branches off from Bystra Valley at Kuźnice at an elevation of 1,014 m. It is bordered to the east by Boczań and Skupniów Upłaz, to the south by Wielka Kopa Królowa, Mała Kopa Królowa, and Magura, and to the west by the northwest ridge of Magura, which includes Jaworzyńska Czuba, Zawrat Kasprowy, and Jaworzyńskie Czoła. In its upper part, the valley splits into two branches: the orographically right branch forms Długi Couloir, extending toward Przełęcz między Kopami, while the left branch is Pod Czerwienicą Couloir, cutting between the slopes of Mała Kopa Królowa and Kopa Magury. On the upper slopes of Jaworzyńskie Turnie lies Magurska Cave, not accessible to tourists.

On the orographically right slopes below Skupniów Upłaz, numerous rock formations and small peaks rise, including Cyganka, Cycek, Cygan, Parzące Turnie, Mnich, Krzemionka, Wołowa Turnia, and Gruba Turnia. The Mnich rock formation (8 m high) is considered by Władysław Cywiński one of the most difficult to access in the Tatras, climbed by Robert Janik.

== Description ==
Carved entirely in limestone, Jaworzynka is a narrow, elongated valley resembling a gully, with steep slopes. Its lower part, where Polana Jaworzynka with shepherd huts is located, is nearly flat and level. The valley's stream, Jaworzynka, flows only after heavy rainfall due to underground drainage. Stefan Żeromski wrote, "I will never forget the Jaworzynka gully under Magura until I die...", while Felicjan Medard Faleński called it "the valley of silence, shade, and serenity".

The orographically right slopes feature distinctive limestone outcrops, each named due to centuries of pastoralism and mining, though these names are now largely obsolete. The left slopes, too steep for grazing or logging, have preserved significant patches of natural cliff forests. Władysław Cywiński notes that Jaworzynka, despite its proximity to urban areas and heavy tourist traffic, hosts more large animals – such as red deer and chamois – than the remote, strictly protected Waksmundzka Valley or Pyszniańska Valley. Brown bears are also sighted, possibly maintaining a den in the valley. Rare plants in the Polish Carpathians, including fly orchid and Rhætic pine, have been recorded here.

== History ==
The valley was historically a site of mining, with iron ore extraction leaving visible traces such as adits, identifiable waste rock piles, and deforested slopes. It was also a significant pastoral center in the Tatras. The entire valley, including its slopes, formed part of Hala Jaworzynka, which included Jaworzynka Polana at its base. Overgrazing on the eastern slopes caused severe erosion, turning them into scree slopes. Regeneration began before World War II and continued post-war, with larch and alder – non-native to the Tatras – proving most effective due to their resilience to temperature swings (up to 60 °C daily) and windstorms compared to spruce.

The valley's smooth slopes create favorable conditions for avalanches. The earliest recorded avalanche death in the Tatras relates to Jaworzynka: in 1855, 16-year-old Łukasz, son of Wacław Bukowski, died in an avalanche on Magura, likely in the Old Mine couloir. Avalanches have since been recorded multiple times, including from Przełęcz między Kopami, Szerokie Couloir, Długi Couloir, and the slopes of Jaworzyńska Czuba.

In 1920, Poland's first large ski jump was built on the valley's slope, with a record distance of 42 m.

== Hiking trails ==
- A yellow trail runs through the valley floor from Kuźnice to Przełęcz między Kopami. Time: approximately 1 h 30 min, ↓ 1 h.
