= At Full Gallop =

1996 Polish film

- Polish: Cwał
- Directed by: Krzysztof Zanussi
- Written by: Krzysztof Zanussi
- Starring: Maja Komorowska; Bartosz Obuchowicz; Karolina Wajda; Piotr Adamczyk; Piotr Szwedes; Andrzej Szenajch
- Cinematography: Jarosław Żamojda
- Edited by: Marek Denys
- Music by: Wojciech Kilar
- Production companies: Studio Filmowe „Tor”; Telewizja Polska
- Distributed by: Studio Filmowe „Tor”
- Release date: 29 April 1996
- Running time: 104 minutes
- Country: Poland
- Language: Polish

At Full Gallop (Polish: Cwał, and also known as In Full Gallop) is a 1996 Polish biographical tragicomedy film written and directed by Krzysztof Zanussi, starring Maja Komorowska, Bartosz Obuchowicz, Karolina Wajda, Piotr Adamczyk, Piotr Szwedes, Andrzej Szenajch, with Halina Gryglaszewska, Sławomira Łozińska, Stanisława Celińska, Krystyna Bigelmajer, Agnieszka Warchulska, Grzegorz Warchoł, Jan Prochyra, Stephen Kember, Eugeniusz Priwiezieńcew, Lew Rywin, and Mario Di Nardo in supporting roles. Zanussi has described the film as his most autobiographical work. It was screened in the Un Certain Regard section at the 1996 Cannes Film Festival. The film was selected as the Polish entry for the Best Foreign Language Film at the 69th Academy Awards, but was not accepted as a nominee.

== Plot ==
A young boy in post-World War II, Communist-dominated Poland, whose father's decision to remain in the United Kingdom after the war has made his family politically suspect with the local Party authorities, is sent by his mother to stay with an "aunt" (in reality an old family friend) in the capital, Warsaw. Ida is a strong-willed, single, middle-aged woman who has found her own ways of surviving in the Communist-run society (which sometimes involves her charming powerful older men, as well as maintaining two different sets of identity papers). She gets Hubert admitted to one of the city's best schools by portraying him as the orphan of a war hero. But she also shares with him her own passion for horses, at a time when riding is seen by many officials as a relic of the old aristocratic class. Hubert himself, meanwhile, struggles to understand how it can be right for a good Catholic to lie in order to survive under Communism.

== Cast ==
- Maja Komorowska as Aunt Idalia Dobrowolska
- Bartosz Obuchowicz as Hubert
- Karolina Wajda as Rozmaryna
- Piotr Adamczyk as Ksawery
- Piotr Szwedes as Dominik
- Andrzej Szenajch as cavalry captain
- Halina Gryglaszewska as Idalia's aunt
- Sławomira Łozińska as Hubert's mother
- Stanisława Celińska as Justyna Winewar (minister's wife)
- Krystyna Bigelmajer as teacher
- Agnieszka Warchulska as headteacher
- Grzegorz Warchoł as LZS director
- Jan Prochyra as UB officer interrogating Hubert's mother
- Stephen Kember as British diplomat
- Eugeniusz Priwiezieńcew as public prosecutor
- Lew Rywin as minister
- Mario Di Nardo as Italian diplomat

== Filming ==
The film was mostly shot in Czerwińsk nad Wisłą and Łąck.

== See also ==
- List of submissions to the 69th Academy Awards for Best Foreign Language Film
- List of Polish submissions for the Academy Award for Best International Feature Film
