= Nosal =

Mountain in Poland

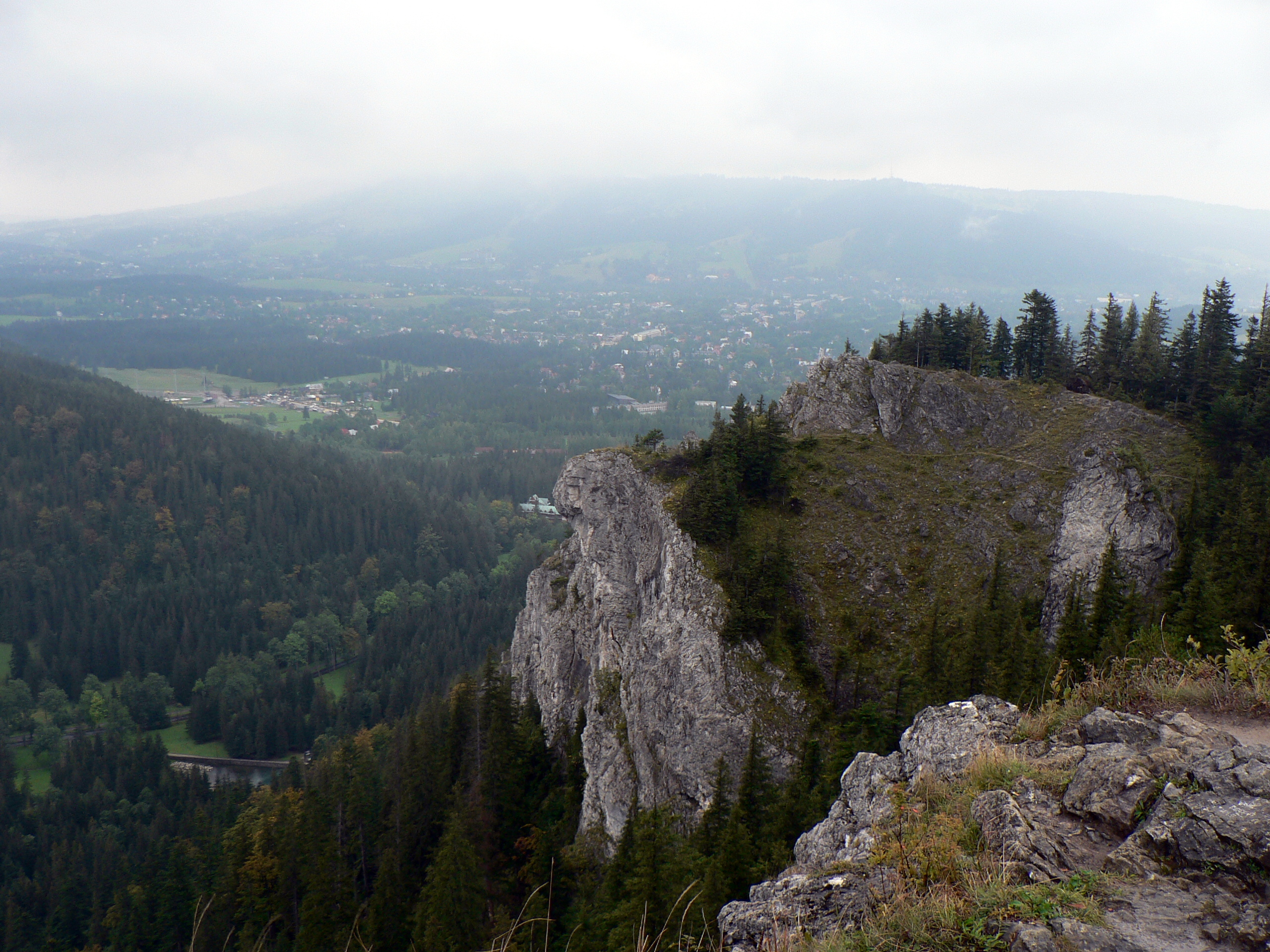

Highest point
- Elevation: 1,206 m (3,957 ft)
- Prominence: 104 m (341 ft)
- Coordinates: 49°16′35″N 19°59′22″E

Geography
- Location: Poland
- Parent range: Western Tatras

Nosal (lit. 'The Nose') is a mountain in the Tatra Mountains of Poland, and is 1,206 metres AMSL at its highest, rising over Bystra Valley and Olczyska Valley next to the town of Zakopane. Exposed limestone rocks visible on the mountain resemble a nose, hence the name. It's known as a place for skiing and gliding.
