= The Revenge (film) =

2002 film

Zemsta The Revenge
- Directed by: Andrzej Wajda
- Produced by: ArkaFilm; Kredyt Bank; Telewizja Polska; Vision
- Starring: Roman Polanski; Janusz Gajos; Andrzej Seweryn; Katarzyna Figura; Daniel Olbrychski
- Music by: Wojciech Kilar
- Distributed by: MGE
- Release date: 2002
- Running time: 105 minutes
- Language: Polish

The Revenge is the English title for Zemsta, a film released in 2002, directed by Andrzej Wajda. This film is an adaptation of a perennially popular stage farce of the same name by the Polish dramatist and poet Aleksander Fredro.

Written in a sharp, ironic style, The Revenge portrays those national characteristics that in time brought on many of Poland's national tragedies. Written for the stage, Wajda has changed very little and transferred practically the entirety of the work to the screen.

== Plot ==
Raptusiewicz (Janusz Gajos) resides in one half of a castle with the other half inhabited by his hated rival Rejent Milczek (Andrzej Seweryn). Raptusiewicz wishes to marry Podstolina (Katarzyna Figura), the widow of the Lord High Steward, for her money, while Podstolina herself seeks a wealthy match. Regent Milczek's wish, on the other hand, is to bring about the union of his son Wacław (Rafał Królikowski) with Podstolina. To complicate matters more, Wacław is in love with Klara (Agata Buzek) - ward and niece of Raptusiewicz, who took her in following the death of her parents - and the feeling is mutual. The plot thickens when Klara turns into Papkin's (Roman Polanski) declared object of love.

== Cast ==
- Roman Polanski as Józef Papkin
- Janusz Gajos as Cześnik Maciej Raptusiewicz
- Andrzej Seweryn as Rejent Milczek
- Katarzyna Figura as Podstolina Hanna Czepiersińska
- Daniel Olbrychski as Dyndalski
- Agata Buzek as Klara
- Rafał Królikowski as Wacław
- Lech Dyblik as Śmigalski
- Jerzy Slonka as priest
- Cezary Żak as Perełka

== See also ==
- Cinema of Poland
- List of Polish language films
