= Magura (Western Tatras) =

Mountain in the Western Tatras in Poland

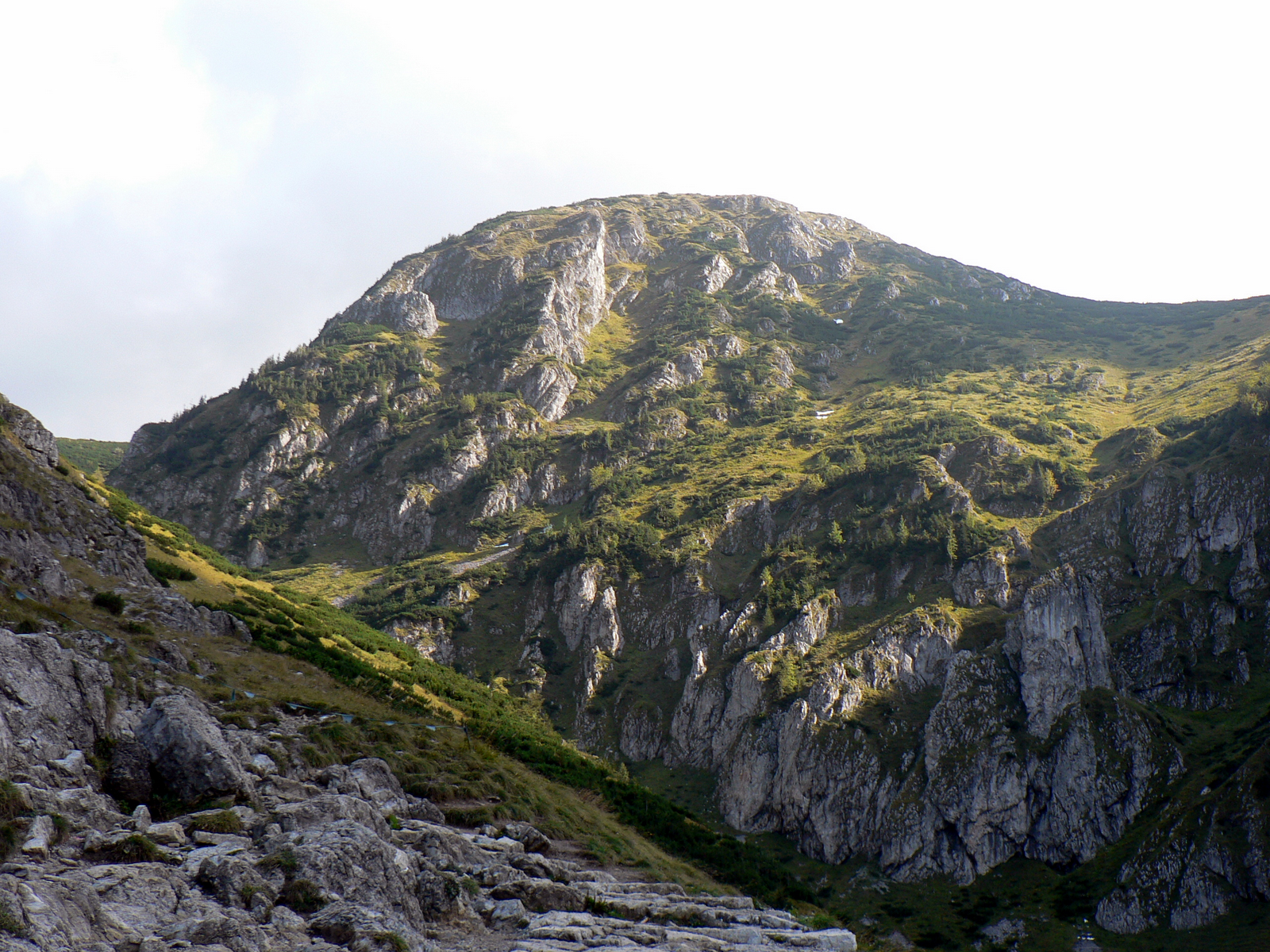
- Magura viewed from Jaworzynka Valley

Highest point
- Elevation: 1,704 m (5,591 ft)
- Prominence: 42 m (138 ft)
- Coordinates: 49°14′55″N 20°00′02″E

Geography
- Location within Poland
- Parent range: Western Tatras

Magura is a peak located in the Kasprowy Wierch massif, part of the Western Tatras in Poland. The peak is located between the Uhrocie Kasprowe and the Mała Kopa Królowa in the Western Tatras.

The name of the peak originates from the Vlachs, pastoral peoples which introduced grazing to the Tatra Mountains. In their language, the name for the peak relates to a small, isolated peak. Formerly, the peak was named Kopa Jaworzyńska or Kopa, and was grazed on, being part of the Królowa Tundra. The slopes of the peak as a result of excess pasturage underwent strong erosion. At present the flora has regrown on the peak, covering it with creeping pine and grassland.
