= Alliance Square =

Urban square in Warsaw, Poland

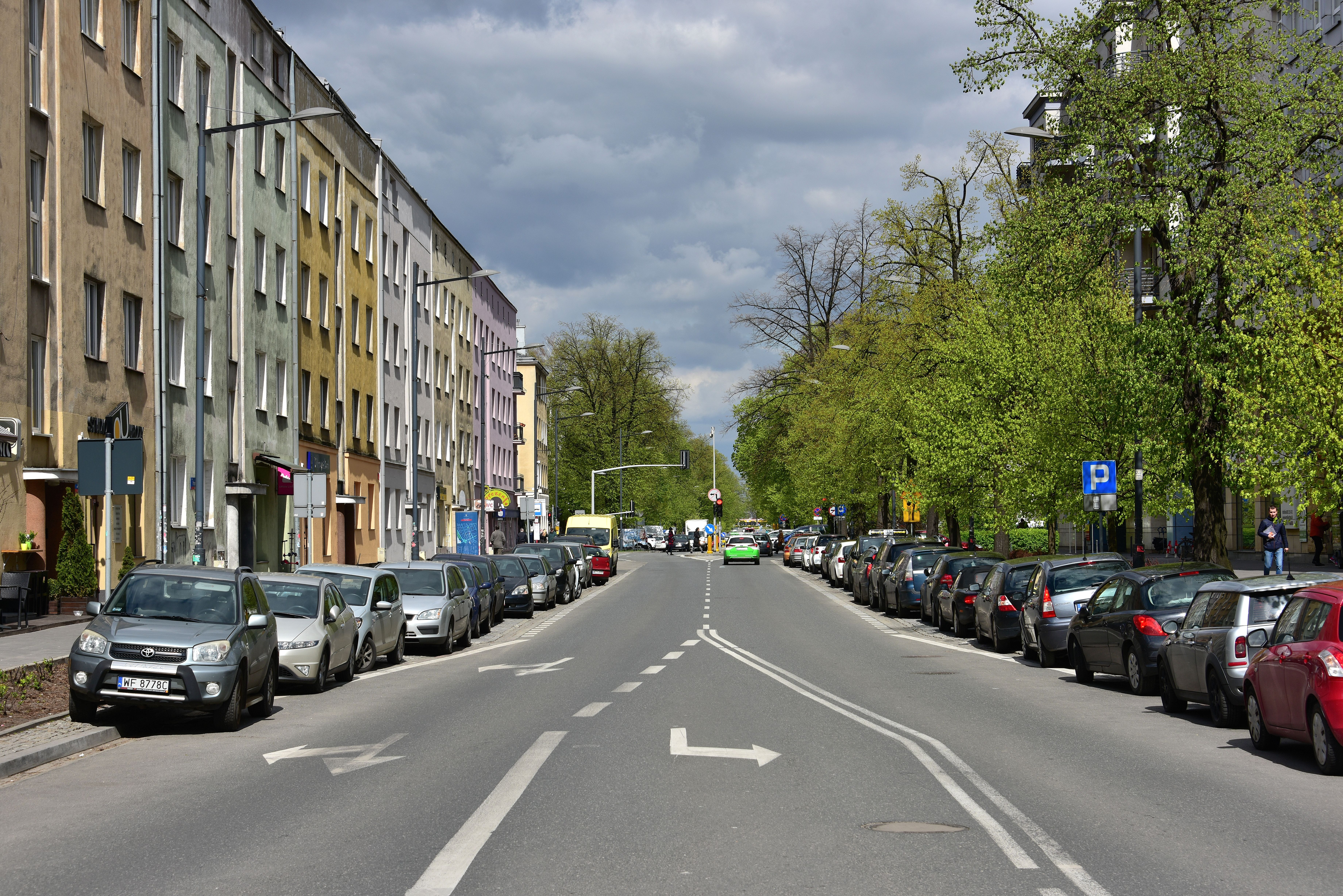
- The Alliance Square in 2017.

- Location within Warsaw
- Type: Street, urban square
- Location: Praga-South, Warsaw, Poland
- Coordinates: 52°13′50.5″N 21°03′23.3″E
- North: Francuska Street; Zwycięzców Street
- South: Paryska Street

The Alliance Square (Polish: Plac Przymierza) is a short street and urban square in Warsaw, Poland, located in the neighbourhood of Saska Kępa, within the Praga-South district. To the north it intersects with Francuska and Zwycięzców Streets, and to the south, it turns to Paryska Street. Originally developed as a small urban square, it was reduced to a street in the early 2000s. It is surrounded on both sides by mid-rise apartment buildings.

== Toponomy ==
The square is named after the Franco-Polish alliance in the interwar period. The neighbouring Francuska Street (lit. 'French Street') and Paryska Street (lit. 'Paris Street') were also named in its honour.

== History ==
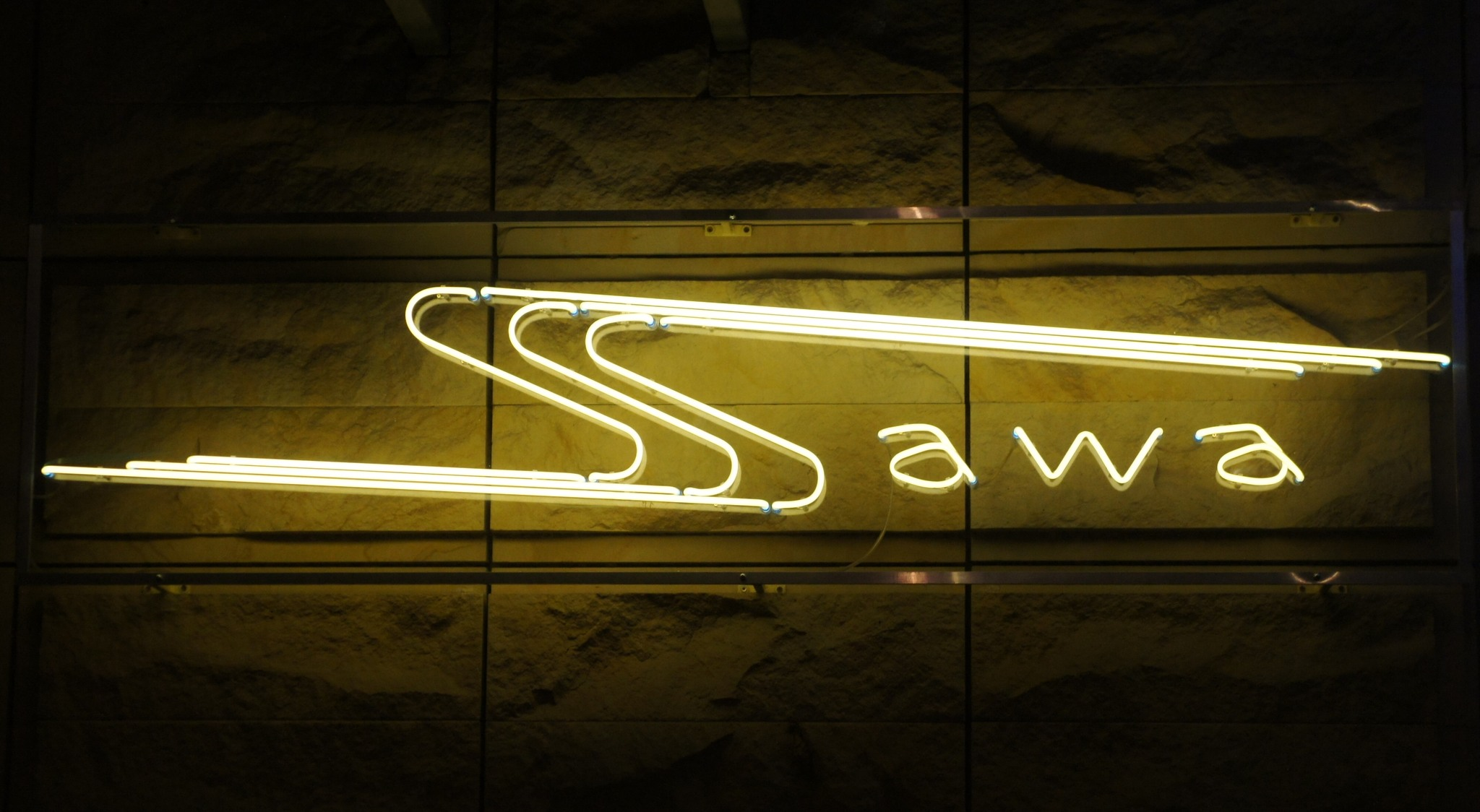
A neon sign remaining after the cinema Sawa.

In 1963, Sawa, the first cinema in the neighbourhood of Saska Kępa, was opened next to the square. The Mermaid, a sculpture by Jerzy Chojnacki, which depicted a mermaid holding a bouquet, was also placed in front of the cinema. Currently it stands at 274 Grochowska Street. A large car park was placed next to the cinema. The complex of Drukarz Sports Club, featuring an association football pitch field, was located on the other side of the road.

On 16 September 1987, the bust of Stefan Żeromski, sculptured by Stanisław Sikora, was unveiled in front of the cinema. The building was demolished in 2000, while the sculpture was moved several meters further from its location. In 1998, a commemorative plaque dedicated to Grażyna Lipińska, was installed on the façade of an apartment building at 8 Alliance Square. She was a veteran of the First and Second World Wars, a lieutenant colonel in the Polish Armed Forces, and a political prisoner of a Soviet Gulag. In 2002, two large mid-rise apartment buildings were constructed around the square were, removing most of its area, reducing it to a road.

== Overview ==
The Alliance Square is a short road, which intersects with Francuska and Zwycięzców Streets to the north, and turns into Paryska Street in the south. It is surrounded on both sides by the mid-rise apartment buildings. The bust of Stefan Żeromski, sculptured by Stanisław Sikora and unveiled in 1987, stands at the intersection with Zwyciężców Street. The façade of an apartment building at 8 Alliance Square features a commemorative plaque dedicated to Grażyna Lipińska, a veteran of the First and Second World Wars, a lieutenant colonel in the Polish Armed Forces, and a political prisoner of a Soviet Gulag.

== Gallery ==
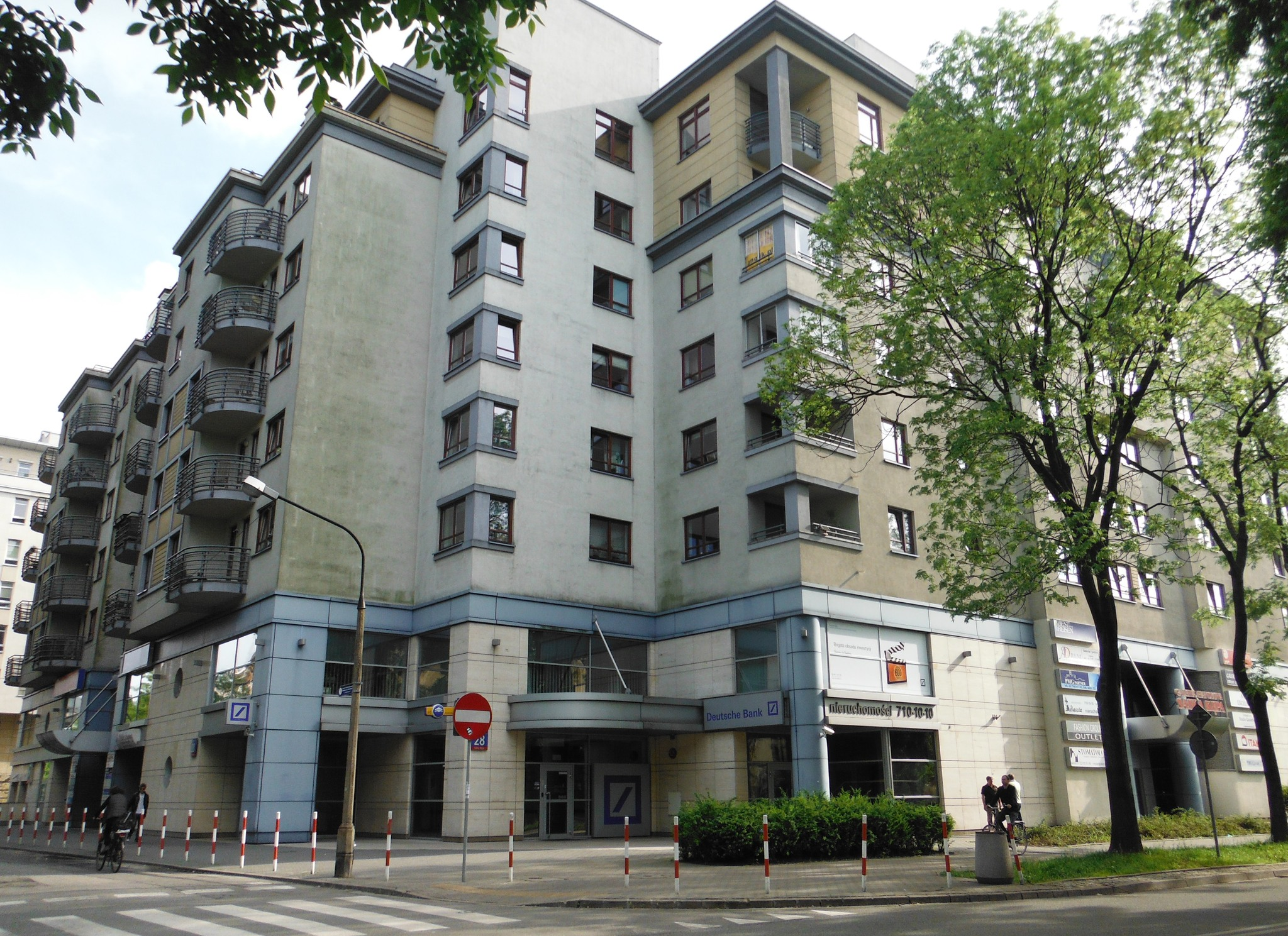
An apartment building at 1 Alliance Square.

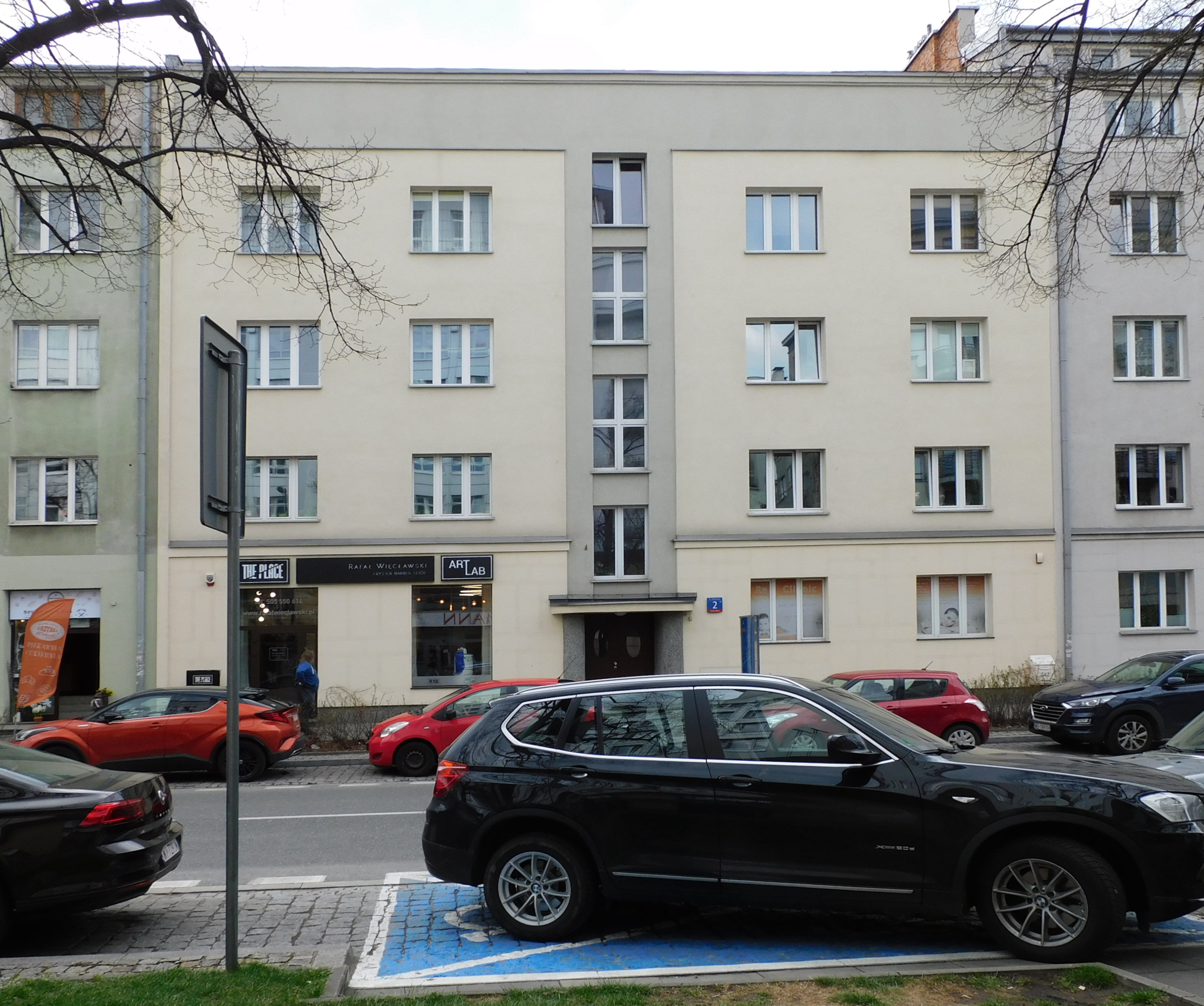
An apartment building at 2 Alliance Square.

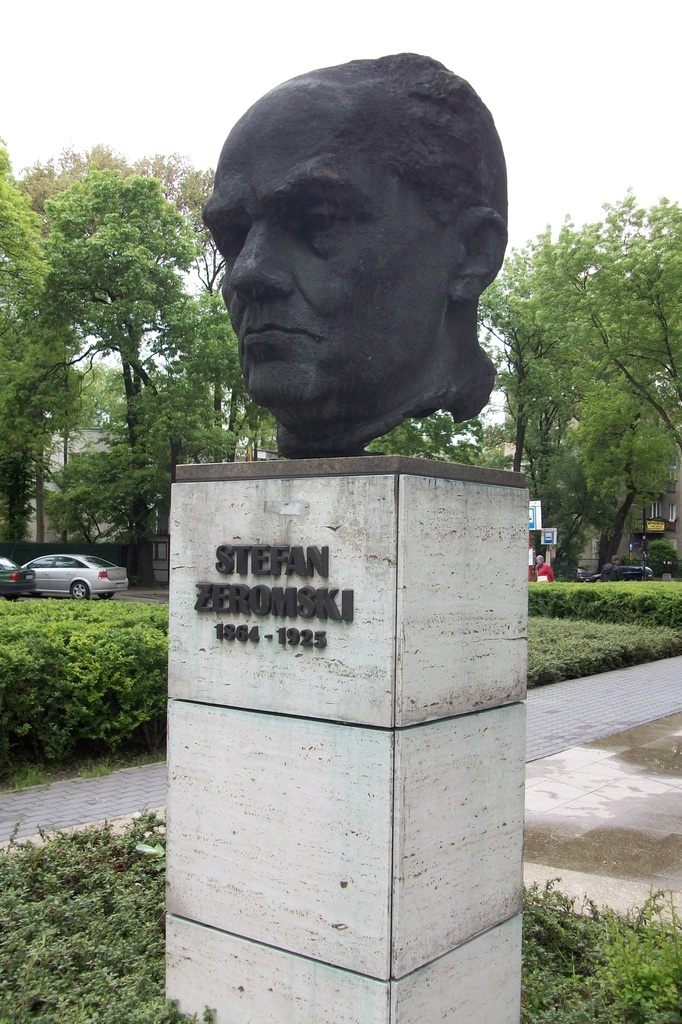
The bust of Stefan Żerosmki by Stanisław Sikora.

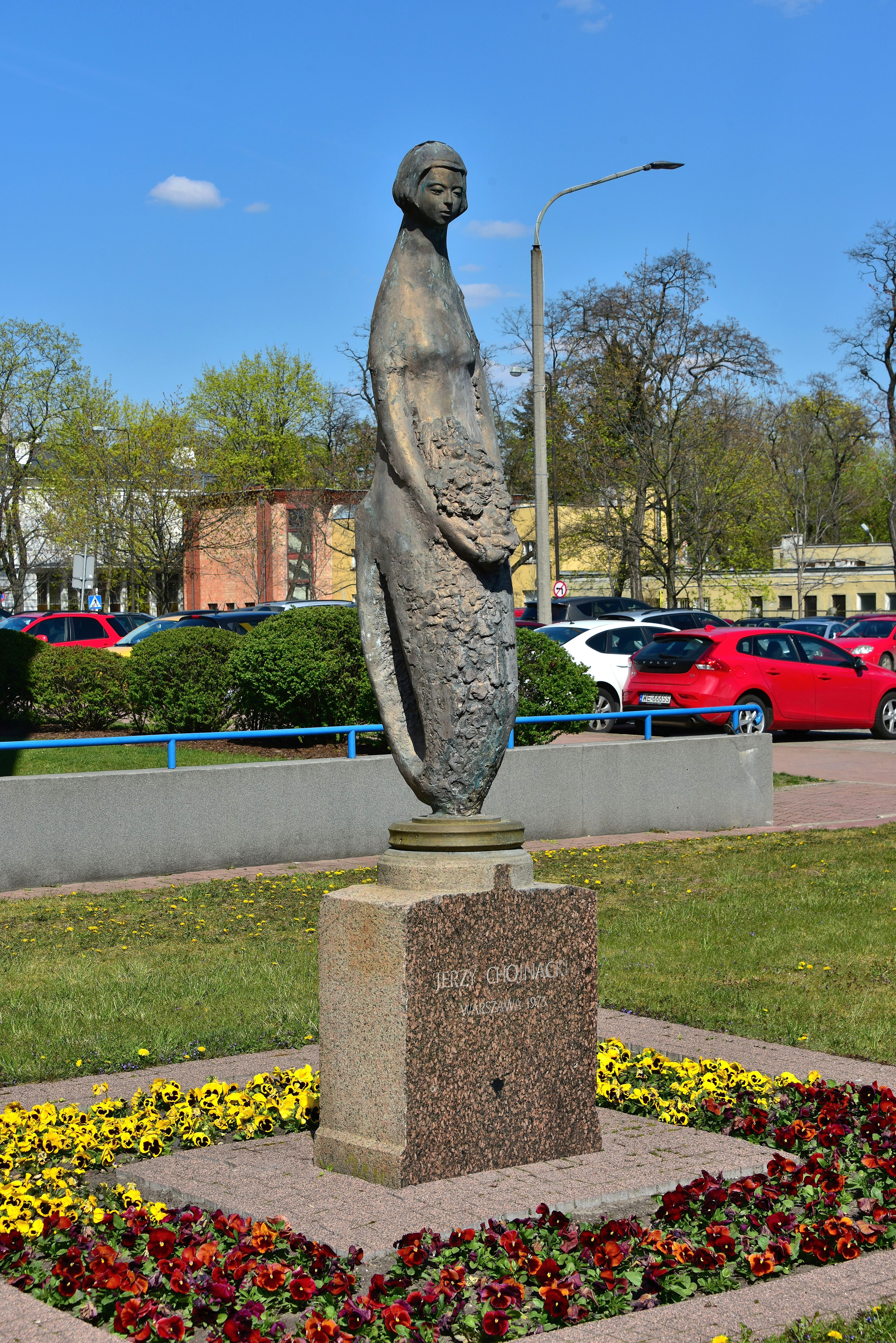
The sculpture The Mermaid by Jerzy Chojnacki, which previously stood at the square.

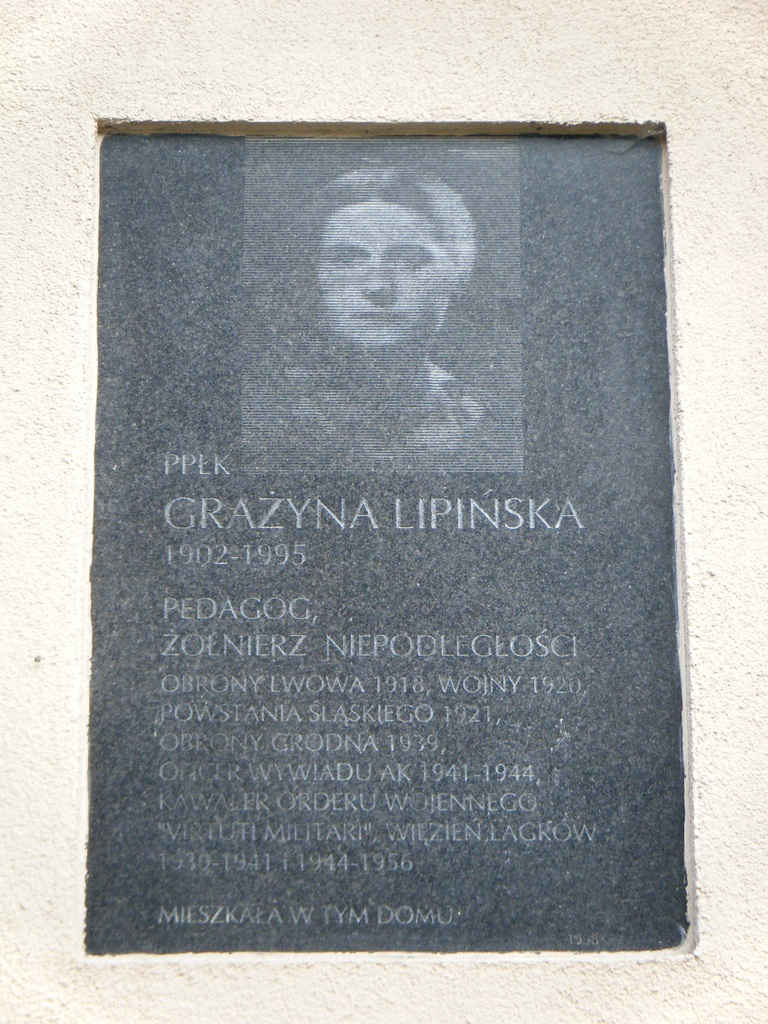
A commemorative plaque at 8 Alliance Square, dedicated to Grażyna Lipińska.
