= Bystra Valley =

Valley in the Polish Western Tatras

Bystra Valley Bystry Stream Valley
- Valley
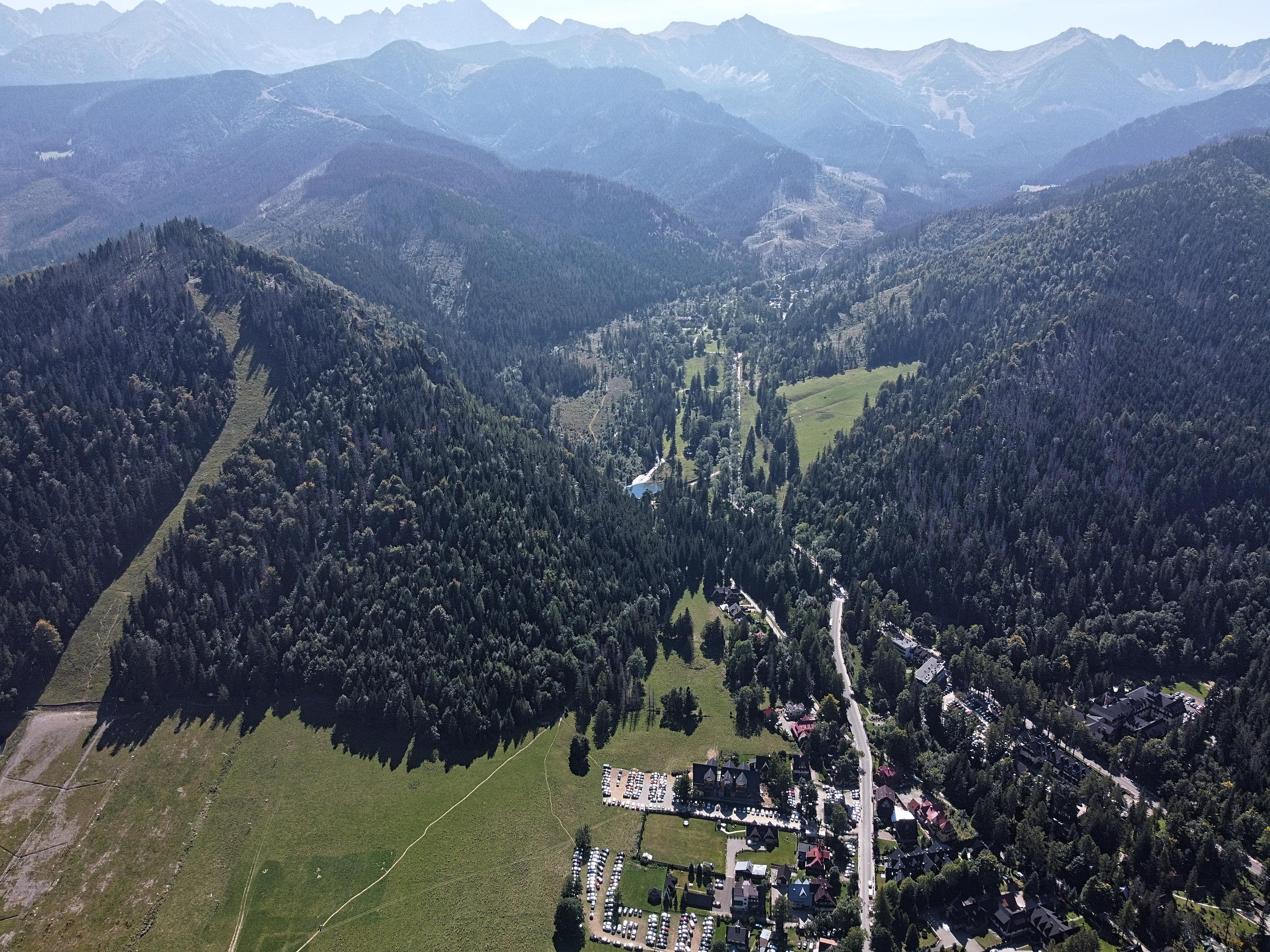
- Bystra Valley from the north
- Interactive map of Bystra Valley
- Coordinates: 49°15′59.0400″N 19°58′44.0400″E
- Location: Lesser Poland Voivodeship, Poland

Area
  - Total: 17 km^{2} (6.6 sq mi)

Dimensions
  - Length: 6 km (3.7 mi)

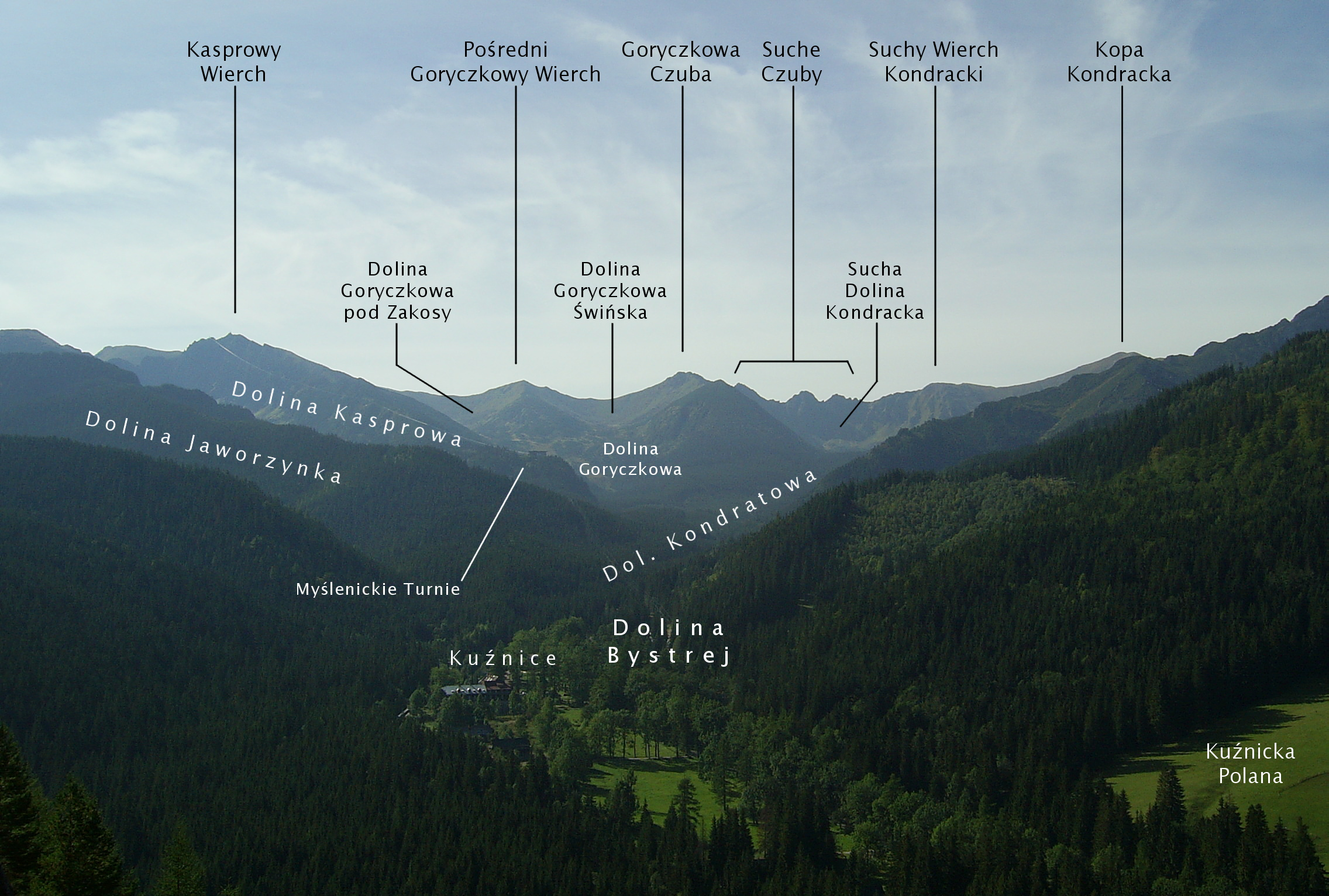
Bystra Valley. View from the trail to Nosal

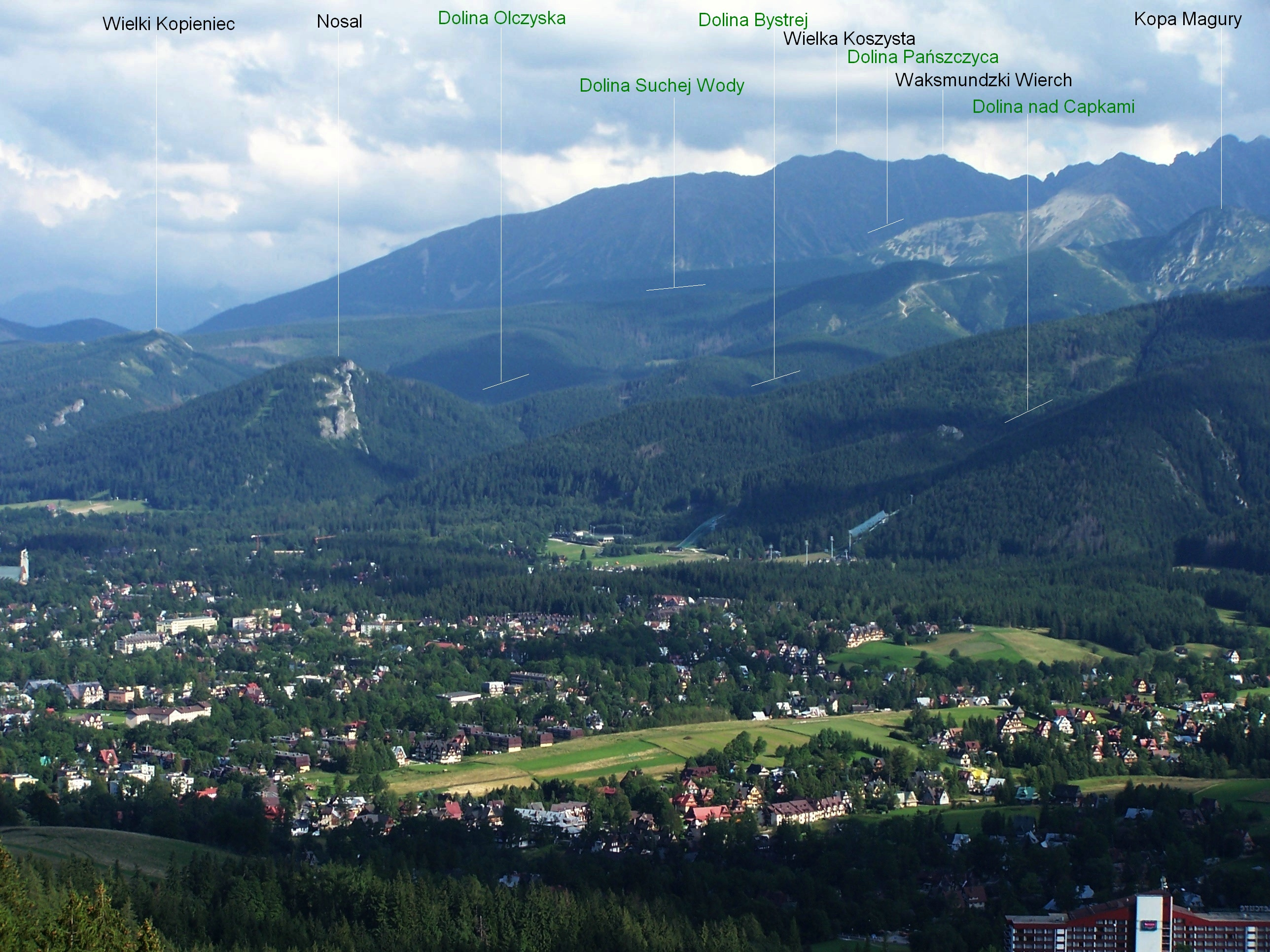
Lower part of Bystra Valley, view from Butorowy Wierch

Bystra Valley, less commonly known as the Bystry Stream Valley, is a valley in the Polish Western Tatras, whose mouth is located in the Zakopane Basin between the slopes of Nosal and Krokiew.

== Topography ==
The valley ascends toward the main arête of the Western Tatras along the section from Kopa Kondracka (2,005 m) through Goryczkowa Czuba (1,911 m) to Kasprowy Wierch (1,987 m). Orographically, the valley's left boundaries are formed by the northern arête of Kopa Kondracka, Giewont, and Krokiew, while the right boundaries are formed by the northeastern arête of Kasprowy Wierch. The narrow mouth is located in Kuźnice at an elevation of 930 m. The valley has several branches:

- Jaworzynka Valley, branching off in Kuźnice and running in a southeasterly direction;
- Kasprowa Valley, which splits higher up into Sucha Kasprowa Valley beneath the rocky cliffs of Kasprowy Wierch and Stare Szałasiska Valley below the steep walls of Zawrat Kasprowy. They are separated by the Bałda ridge, culminating in the higher summit of Uhrocie Kasprowe;
- Goryczkowa Valley, which further up divides into Pod Zakosy Valley and Świńska Valley;
- Kondratowa Valley. Its eastern branch is Sucha Kondracka Valley. Higher up, Kondratowa Valley branches off into Małego Szerokiego Valley with Piekło Basin and Długi Couloir.

== General description ==
Bystra Valley is approximately 6 km long and covers an area of about 17 km². It is composed of both sedimentary and crystalline rocks. It was shaped in various places by the glaciers that once covered it, as well as by karst processes. These karst processes have resulted in numerous caves, grottos, and rock cavities. The most famous of these are: Magurska Cave, Bystra Cave, and Kasprowa Niżnia Cave. Due to the porosity of the limestone substrate, a significant part of the valley is dry, as water flows through underground channels, and permanent streams exist mainly in the lower parts of the valleys. In some places, water emerges from the ground in large karst springs. The largest of these are: Bystra Spring, Goryczkowe Spring, and Kasprowe Spring. The Bystra stream flows along the valley floor, formed by the Goryczkowy Stream and the Kasprowy Stream.

Bystra Valley is known for its strong winds. A powerful aerodynamic jet forms along the axis of the Cicha Liptowska Valley and Bystra Valley, resulting in extensive windthrow. As a result of several centuries of exploitation of the area (herding, mining, metallurgy), there was significant destruction of forests, the removal of mountain pine from parts of the slopes, an artificial lowering of its upper limit, and even complete erosion of some slopes. These activities were discontinued several decades ago, and nature has largely regenerated. Nevertheless, this still results in fairly large avalanches descending in many parts of the Bystra Valley.

== History and present day ==
The mouth of the valley has long since been developed and urbanized. In the past, the area was home to the Homolacs family manor, smithies, steelworks, and a children's sanatorium. Today, the area has: the lower station of the cable car to Kasprowy Wierch, a Tatra Volunteer Search and Rescue information point, residential buildings, the Jaworzynka Hotel, shops, bars, the Albertine Brothers' monastery, the Albertine Sisters' monastery, and the Polish Tourist and Sightseeing Society Kalatówki mountain hotel. Minibuses, taxis, residents' cars, and various municipal and Tatra services run to Kuźnice, and Kuźnice itself is one of the main starting points for trips to the higher parts of the mountains.

Due to its proximity to Zakopane, the valley region was formerly heavily exploited by herding, mining, and excessive logging. There were four pastures in the valley: Hala Jaworzynka, Hala Kasprowa, Hala Goryczkowa, Hala Kondratowa, and Hala Kalatówki. Herding has been completely abolished; only cultural grazing continues in the Kalatówki clearing and Kuźnicka clearing. Significant damage to the vegetation has been caused by the picking and destruction of plants by large numbers of tourists. In winter, the area is crowded with skiers (the Goryczkowa Valley region). The following ski lifts are in operation: the Goryczkowa chairlift and two Kalatówki T-bar lifts. Currently, the entire valley is located within the Tatra National Park, and most of it falls within the strict protection zone of Kondratowa, Goryczkowa, Kasprowa, and Mała Jaworzynka.

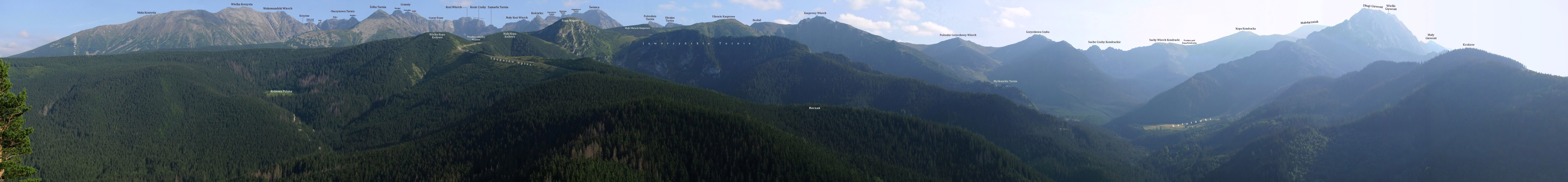
View from Nosal of Bystra Valley and its branches
