= Agnieszka Warchulska =

Polish actress (born 1972)

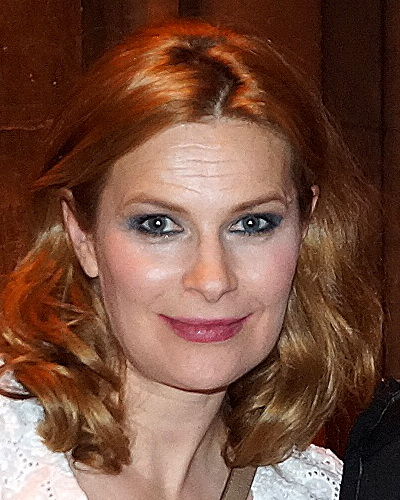
- Agnieszka Warchulska, 2018
- Born: 15 May 1972 (age 54); Ostrowiec Świętokrzyski, Poland
- Occupation: actress
- Years active: since 1995
- Spouse: Przemysław Sadowski

Agnieszka Warchulska (born 15 May 1972 in Ostrowiec Świętokrzyski, Poland) is a Polish actress.

== Filmography ==
- 1996: Cwał
- 1997: Wojenna narzeczona
- 1997: Linia opóźniająca
- 1997: Sława i chwała
- 1998: Pierwszy milion
- 1998: The Debt
- 1999–2001: Miasteczko
- 2002: Zaginiona
- 2003: Tak czy nie
- 2003: Sfora
- 2004: Wieża
- 2004–2005, 2007–2008: M jak miłość
- 2005: Teraz ja
- 2006–2007: Pogoda na piątek
- 2007: Dlaczego nie!
