= Skupniów Upłaz =

Ridge and slopes between Jaworzynka and Olczyska valleys in the Western Tatras

Coordinates: 49°15′37″N 19°59′43″E

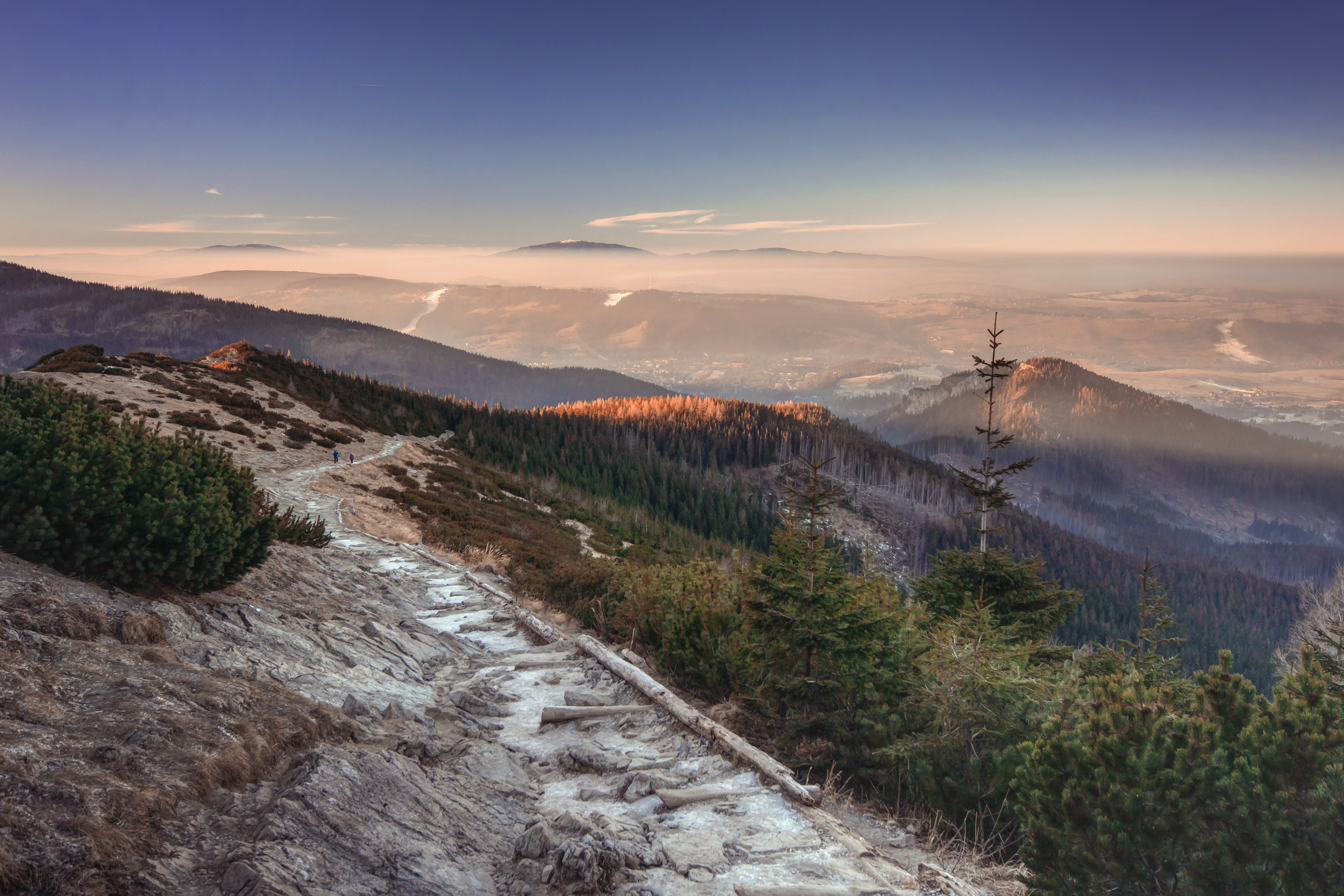
Skupniów Upłaz with Nosal and Zakopane in the background

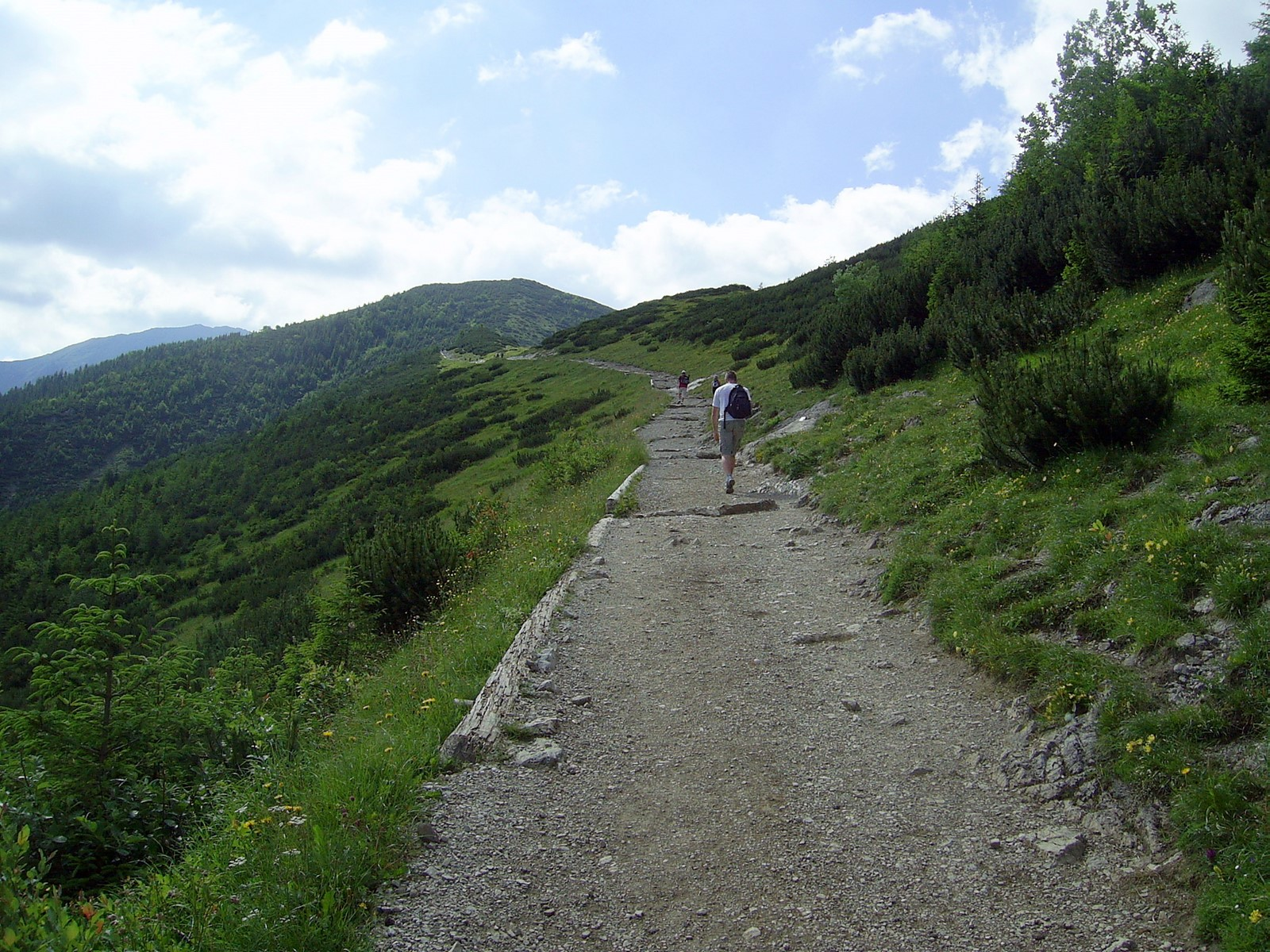
Skupniów Upłaz from the Boczań side

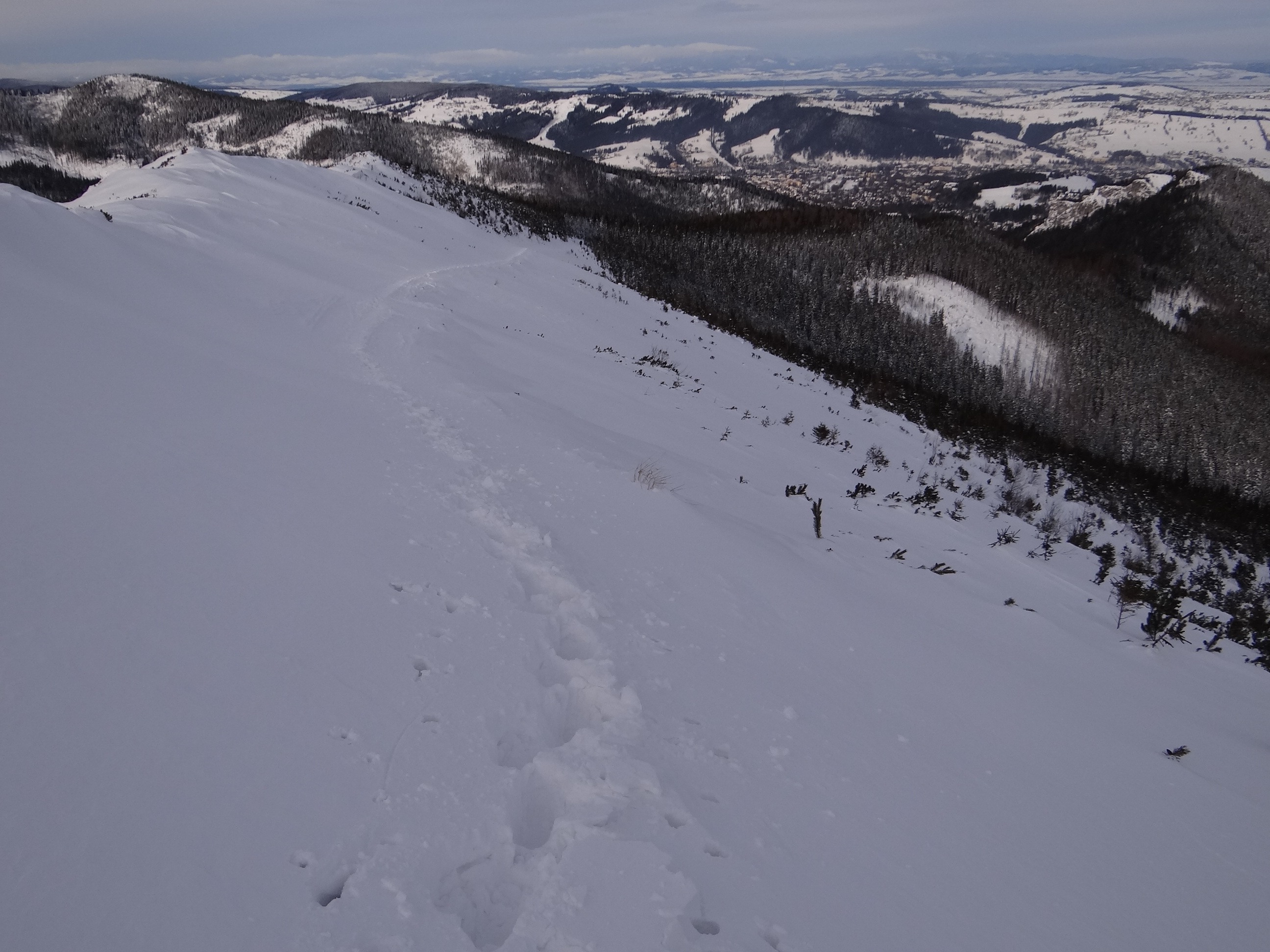
Skupniów Upłaz in winter

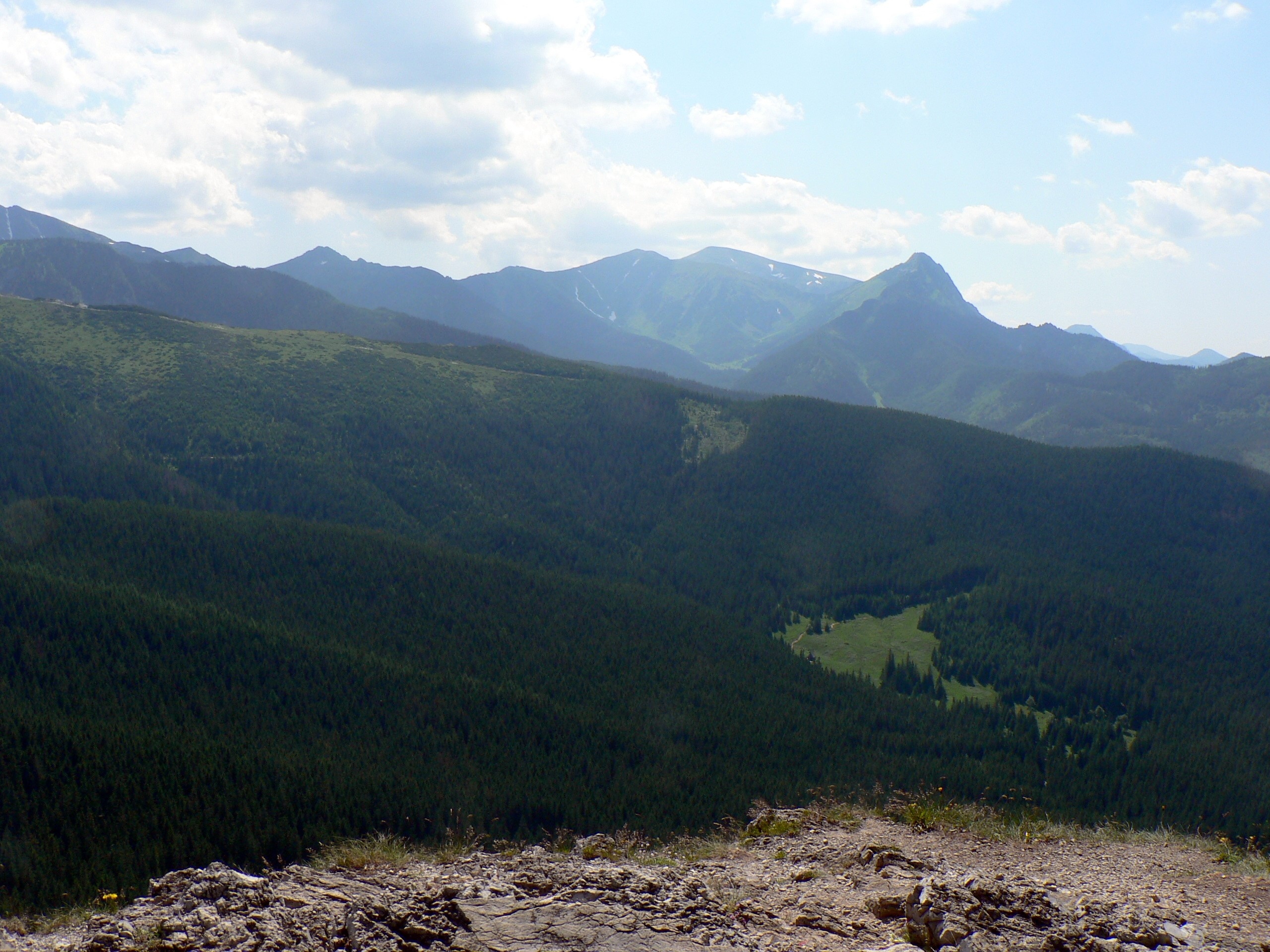
View of Skupniów Upłaz from Wielki Kopieniec

Skupniów Upłaz, also known as Skupniowy Upłaz, refers to the slopes and ridge between Jaworzynka Valley and Olczyska Valley in the Western Tatras, above Skupniów Przechód.

Skupniów Upłaz ranges from approximately 1,300 to 1,470 m above sea level. It is separated from Wielka Kopa Królowa by the Diabełek pass (approximately 1,470 m) and Roja Couloir. To the north, it descends to Skupniów Przechód (approximately 1,275 m) and the eastern ridge of Wysokie. From Diabełek pass, Długi Couloir extends into Jaworzynka Valley, forming its orographically right branch. The slope facing Olczyska Valley is moderately steep, and lacks prominent rock outcrops, with a rocky-grassy upper section and grassy lower section. The slope facing Jaworzynka Valley is steeper, featuring several small rocks and peaks, including Parzące Turnie, Gruba Turnia, Krzemionka, Mnich, and others.

== Naming ==
Historically, the name Skupniów Upłaz referred to the slopes descending into Olczyska Valley between Boczań and Przełęcz między Kopami. Currently, it includes the entire ridge along these slopes. The name originates from the local surname Skupień, with upłaz meaning a gentle, grassy mountain ridge in the regional dialect. Pastoral and mining activities led to the naming of various slope sections significant to shepherds and miners, though these names are now obsolete.

== Description ==
Composed of limestone and dolomite, Skupniów Upłaz supports a diverse flora of calcicole Tatra plant species on its unforested grassy areas and limestone outcrops. These species include mountain avens, Pedicularis oederi, Tofieldia calyculata, alpine gypsophila, Androsace chamaejasme, Oxytropis carpatica, Alpine clematis, Anthyllis alpestris, Carduus defloratus, fringed sandwort, buckler-mustard, Sesleria tatrae, Saxifraga caesia, alpine saxifrage, yellow mountain saxifrage, purple saxifrage, drooping saxifrage, Bellidiastrum michelii, alpine butterwort, edelweiss, and round-headed rampion. Rare plant species in Poland, such as Omalotheca hoppeana and Chamorchis alpina, are also present, found in only a few locations within the Tatra Mountains. A hiking trail along the eastern side, below the Triassic dolomite ridge, provides views of Olczyska Valley, Wielki Kopieniec, and Giewont.

== History ==
Historically, Skupniów Upłaz was used for grazing. Its eastern slopes were part of Hala Skupniowa (later Hala Olczysko), while the western slopes belonged to Hala Jaworzynka. Grazing caused significant soil erosion on the Jaworzynka side, with heavy rainfall contributing to soil loss. In 1933, Antoni Wrzosek described these slopes as "forming a bleak landscape of a karst gravel desert". Forests and dwarf mountain pine were cleared for pastoral and mining activities, particularly to supply the smelter in Kuźnice. Regeneration efforts, including larch plantings, began in the interwar period and have restored much of the vegetation. However, tourist traffic has led to erosion on the Olczyska side. The trail through Boczań and Skupniów Upłaz to Gąsienicowa Valley is among the most heavily trafficked trails in the Tatra Mountains. It follows a former mining route used to transport iron ore to Kuźnice and timber uphill for adit supports. In 1860, Jadwiga Łuszczewska described miners removing rear cart wheels and using knotted branches as brakes against boulders.

== Hiking trails ==
- Blue trail: Kuźnice – Boczań – Skupniów Upłaz – Przełęcz między Kopami – Królowa Rówień – Hala Gąsienicowa:
  - Time from Kuźnice to Przełęcz między Kopami: 1 h 40 min, ↓ 1 h 10 min
  - Time from Kuźnice to Murowaniec mountain hut: 2 h, ↓ 1 h 35 min.
