= Homeless People =

1900 book by Stefan Żeromski

The Homeless
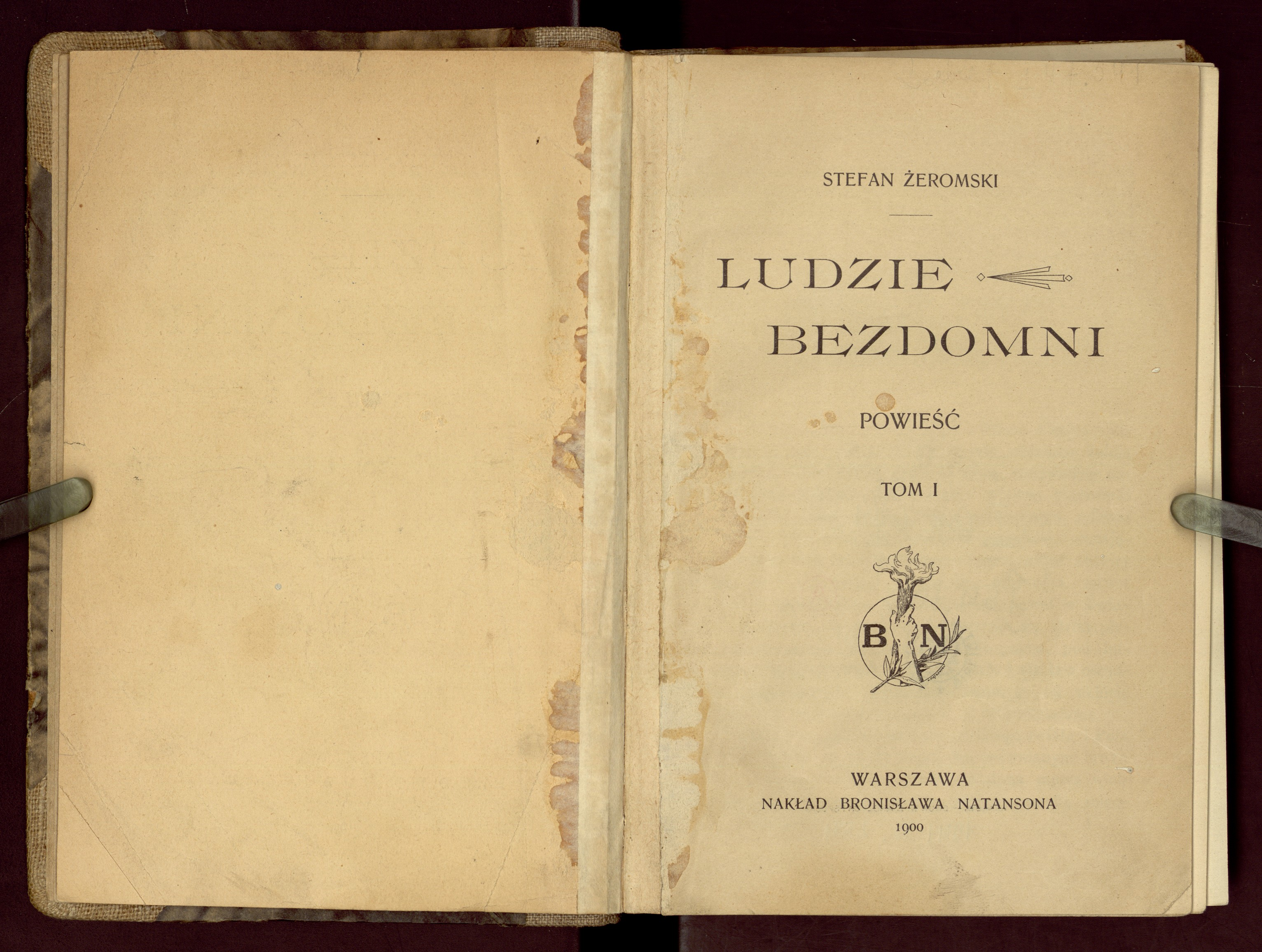
- Author: Stefan Żeromski
- Original title: Ludzie bezdomni
- Language: Polish
- Genre: Modernist
- Publication date: 1900
- Publication place: Austria-Hungary

The Homeless or Homeless People (Polish: Ludzie bezdomni) is a novel written by Stefan Żeromski in 1899 in Zakopane, Poland, published for the first time in 1900. It introduces readers to the life and social work of the young doctor Tomasz Judym, as well as his love of Joanna Podborska. The novel is set at the end of the 19th century and presents the concept of personal devotion and working for the common people.

== Origin ==
The Homeless was the fifth book by Stefan Żeromski to be printed. It was written in 1899 in Zakopane, Poland, and is considered by critics and readers to have had a huge social and political impact in the country. With it, the writer started a new type of contemporary novel, grounded in the realities of Polish life at the end of the 19th century, that revolved around social work. Doctor Judym, the main character, decides to engage in this discipline, when after years of sacrifices he becomes a doctor in order to help other people, especially the poor and neglected.

Żeromski met Tomasz Janiszewski in Zakopane and made him the prototype of the main character, Tomasz Judym.

The writer prepared himself well to write the novel. It constitutes the effect of his cognitive passion and positive views that writing must be joined with an honest, even scientific, penetration of social reality and one's own beliefs. Thanks to The Homeless, Żeromski earned the title of "spiritual guide of a generation". The novel was seen as a work treating the social and moral problems of the age, as a protest against stratification and the misery of the poorest social groups of the nation. By some, it was also considered to be an ideological manifesto proclaiming the fight against opportunism and egoism.

Because of the novel, Żeromski became a moral authority for his contemporaries, and not only in Poland, as The Homeless was published in 14 languages. He exerted a direct influence on the thinking of young people at the beginning of the 20th century.

== Main characters ==
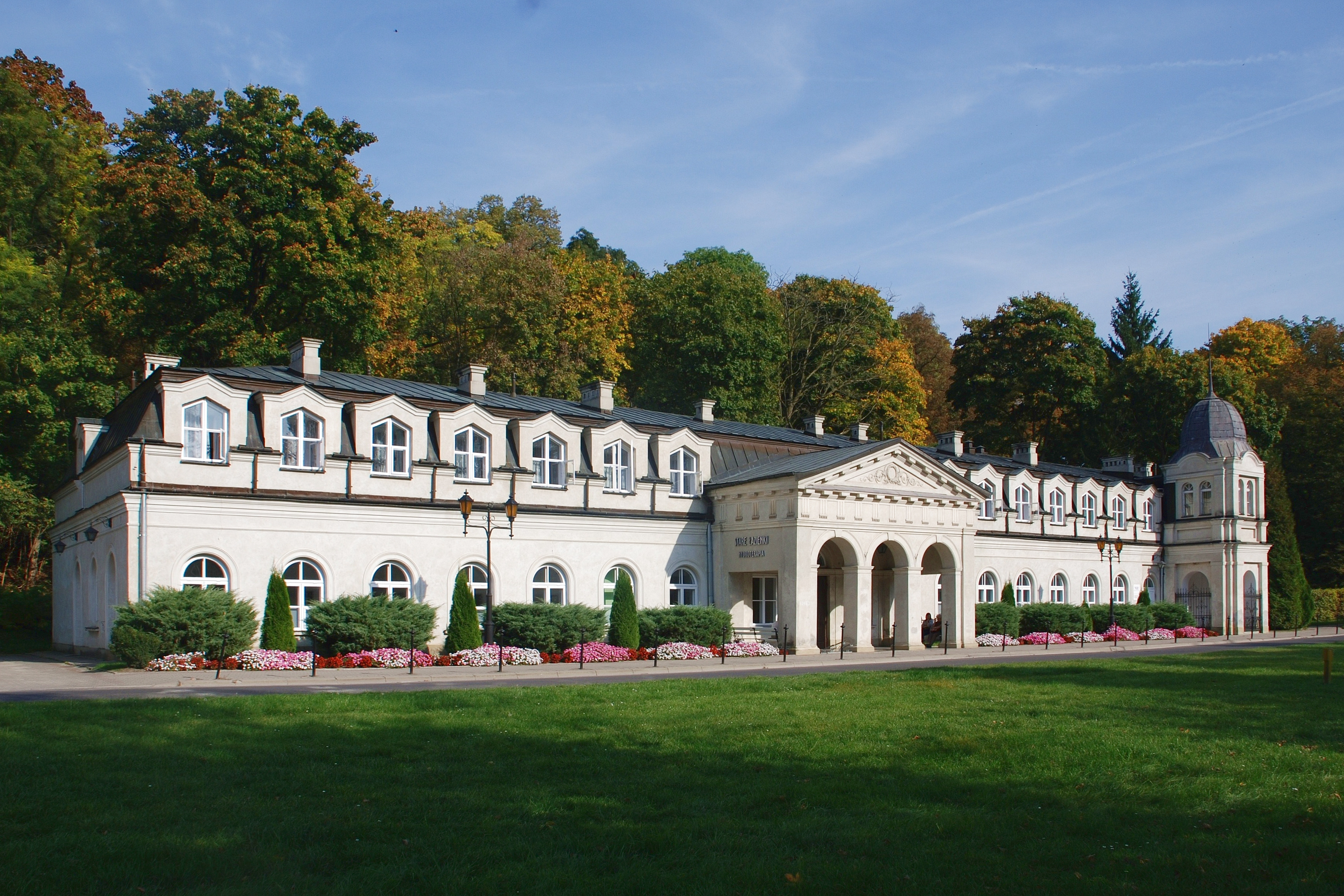
Nałęczów spa town served as inspiration for the town of Cisy in Żeromski's The Homeless

Tomasz Judym is a young, ambitious surgeon who thinks that his mission as a doctor is to help people harmed by chance and wants to improve the living and working conditions of the most deprived. "He is a morally sensitive man rebelling against evil and injustice". The main theme of the novel is the choice that the main character has to make between his own happiness and the happiness of the poorer classes from which he himself comes. Judym believes that if he is happy, fulfilled when it comes to love and starts a family, he will soon become an egoist and insensitive to people's suffering. He will no longer understand a man living in poverty. That is why the hero, despite being deeply in love with Joanna Podborska, decides to give up the vision of domestic warmth.

Żeromski gave Judym the characteristics of a romantic hero: dilemmas, feeling of alienation, individualism. However, Żeromski's hero also has the features of a positivistic social man: the desire to devote himself to others, altruism and the idea of organic work. Probably by giving the hero some positivistic features the writer wanted to show that the decision about the separation was necessary in order to help others. "Because of his dilemma Tomasz Judym is a tragic hero - he has to choose between his own happiness and the obligation he feels to pay his debt to a society."

Joanna Podborska is about 26 years old and is a governess for two young women. She lost her parents early in life and not only works to maintain herself, but also her two brothers (one of whom died in Irkutsk, the other studies in Switzerland). Her character is presented in a very interesting way, in the main plot she is only seen through the eyes of Judym, who can only read her feelings from her face. The reader does not know what Joanna thinks or feels, but only sees her from Tomasz' point of view. A lot more information about her can be obtained from her diary. This shows that she is an intelligent woman maintaining her younger siblings, she is largely self-educated, she is constantly reading and learning and she is interested in theatre and literature. Joanna treats her job as a mission or spiritual parenthood. She is very proud and full of dignity. She doesn't hide her interest in men because she likes a lot of them, but she never flirts. Although she desires love, she never hunts for a man. Joanna wants to be a modern woman, she believes in good and in progress, and wants to contribute to it. She values her independence and likes working, however, she is also very sensitive and is suffering because of her orphanage upbringing and loneliness. She is longing for her lost home and wants to be close with someone. She loves Judym very much and thinks that together they can build a home which would end a wandering period of their lives.

Finally, Joanna is defeated. She discovers that the affection she feels for Judym is of less importance than his sense of duty. She doesn't want to stop Judym from gaining his noble aim. She is disappointed, but accepts the situation with dignity.

== English translation ==
An English translation of The Homeless, by Stephanie Kraft, was published in 2024.

== See also ==
- Polish literature
- Young Poland
- The Spring to Come

== Sources ==
- "Ludzie bezdomni" by Stefan Żeromski
