= Jan Prochyra =

Polish actor, voice actor and stage director

- Born: 2 December 1948; Kraków, Poland
- Died: 20 May 2015 (aged 66); Warsaw, Poland
- Occupation: Actor

Jan Prochyra (2 December 1948 – 20 May 2015) was a Polish actor, voice actor and stage director.

== Life and career ==
Born in Kraków, Prochyra graduated from the AST National Academy of Theatre Arts in 1974. He made his acting debut in 1968, and debuted as a stage director in 1977. Very active as a voice actor and a dubber, he was the Polish voice of Winnie the Pooh 's Eeyore and of The Jungle Book 's Baloo. Prochyra was the artistic director of the Rampa Theatre in Warsaw.
