= Paweł Komorowski =

Polish film director

- Born: 14 August 1930; Warsaw, Poland
- Died: 28 November 2011 (aged 81); Zakopane, Poland
- Occupations: Film director Screenwriter
- Years active: 1955–2000

Paweł Komorowski (14 August 1930 – 28 November 2011) was a Polish film director and screenwriter. He directed twenty films between 1955 and 2000.

== Selected filmography ==
- Pięciu (1964)
- Syzyfowe prace (2000)
