= Syzyfowe prace =

1897 autobiographical novel by Stefan Żeromski

Syzyfowe prace (The Labors of Sisyphus in English) is an autobiographical novel by Polish author Stefan Żeromski which first appeared in the magazine Nowa Reforma in 1897. The work was published under the pseudonym Maurycy Zych and it was the writer's first published work.

The novel is based on the author's personal experiences as a child and adolescent in the Russian-controlled Congress Poland. It is a portrait of his school and its students' attempts to resist the policy of Russification imposed by the Tsarist authorities. The main plot shows the transformation of the protagonist Marcin Borowicz, from fascination with Russia to Polish patriotism under the influence of Andrzej Radek. The title refers to the Greek myth of Sisyphus, and portrays the attempts to indoctrinate the students as an occasionally successful, but ultimately doomed to failure, endeavor. Initially, the novel was to be titled "The Savior", referring to the change in the attitude of the main character.

The novel is set in the fictional town of Kleryków. One of the main characters, and one of the leaders of the rebellious students is Marcin Borowicz, originally named Andrzej Radek, a farmer's son.

In 2000, it was adapted into a film of the same name by Paweł Komorowski.
