= Stefan Żeromski =

Polish novelist and dramatist (1864–1925)

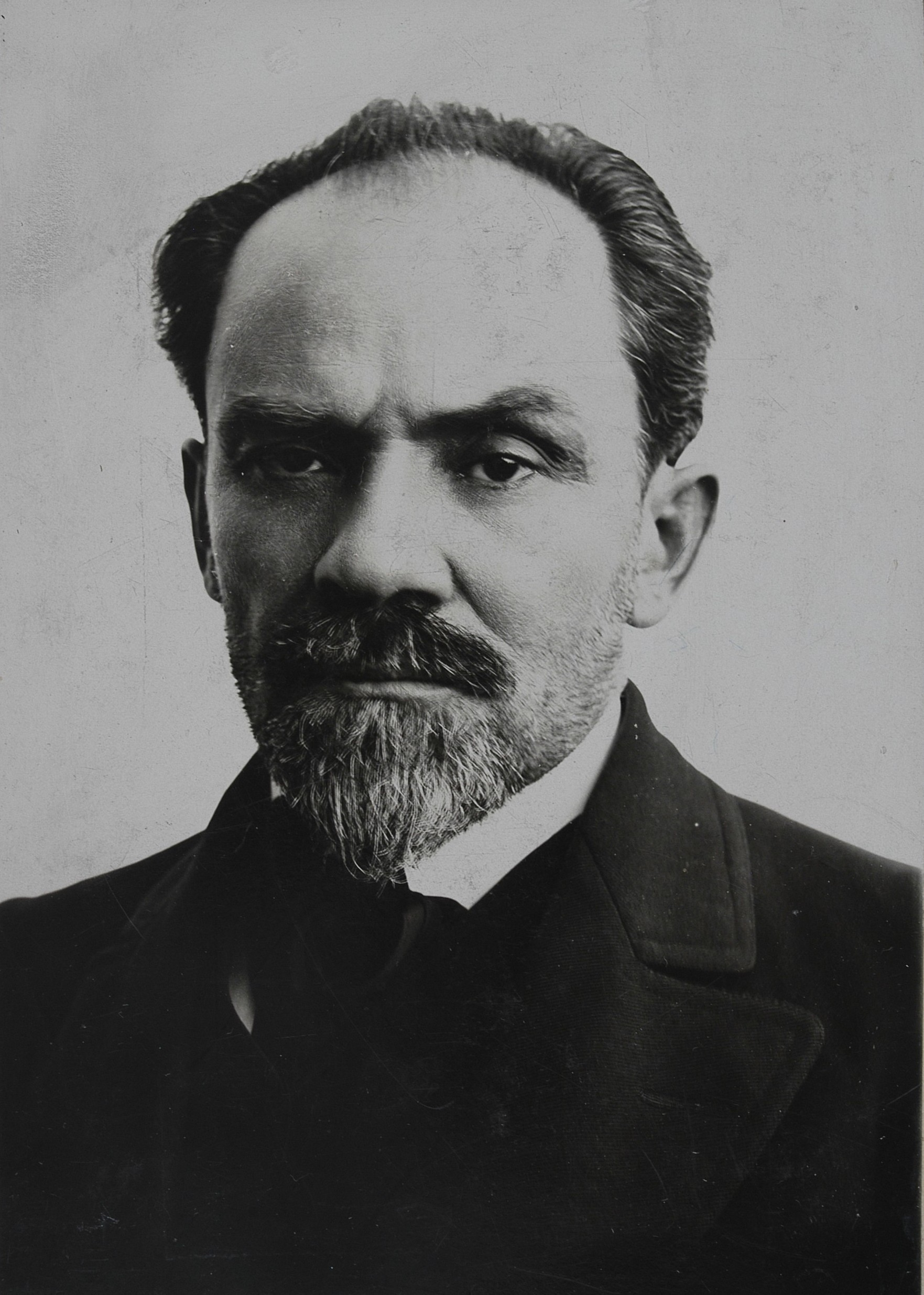
- Photograph of Żeromski, 1915
- Born: 14 October 1864; Strawczyn, Kingdom of Poland
- Died: 20 November 1925 (aged 61); Warsaw, Poland
- Occupation: Writer
- Spouse(s): Anna Zawadzka; Oktawia Radziwiłłowicz
- Children: Monika Żeromska; Adam Żeromski
- Writing career
- Pen name: Maurycy Zych, Józef Katerla, Stefan Iksmoreż
- Notable works: Przedwiośnie; Ludzie bezdomni Popioły; Syzyfowe prace

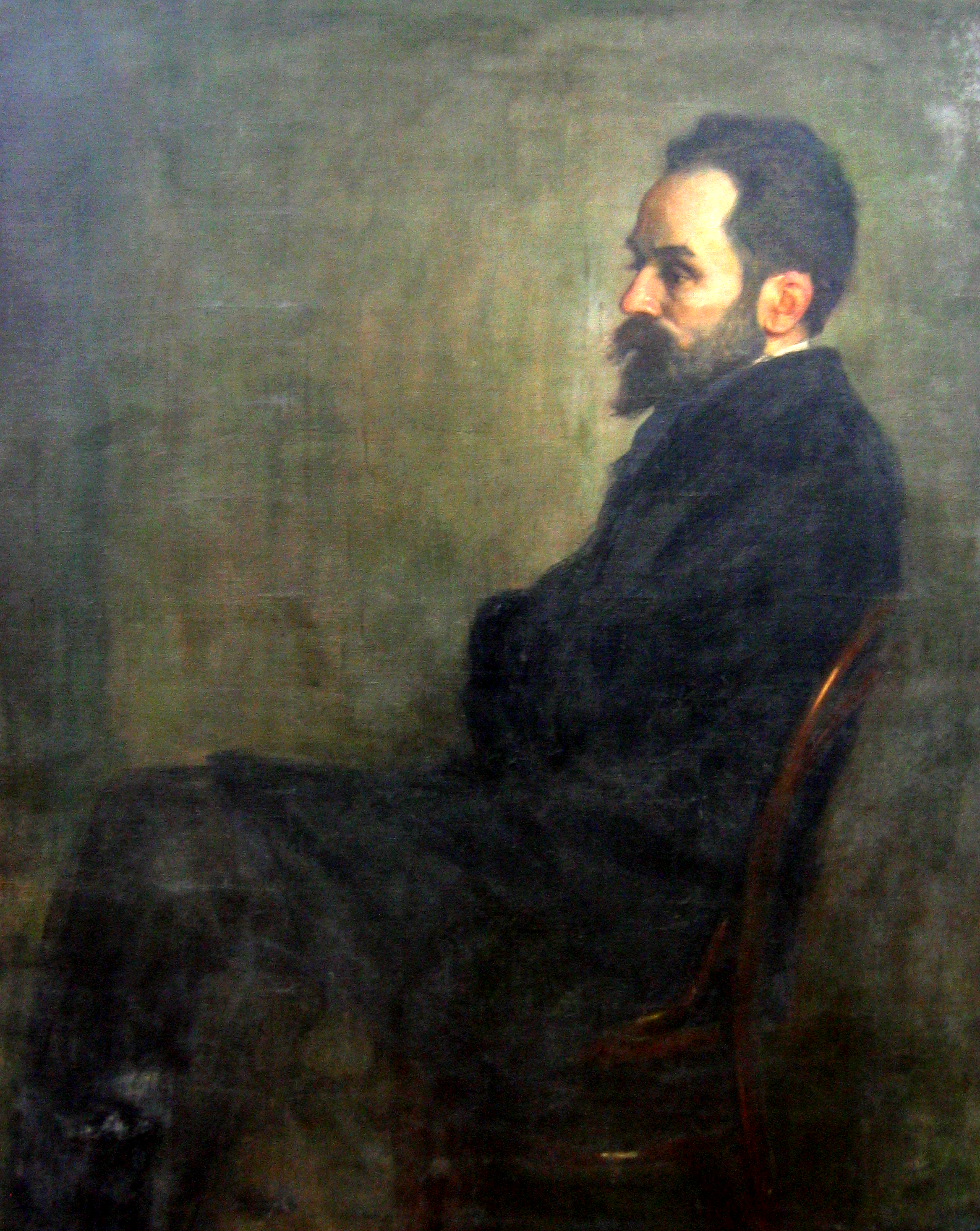
Niewiadomski's 1900 portrait of Żeromski

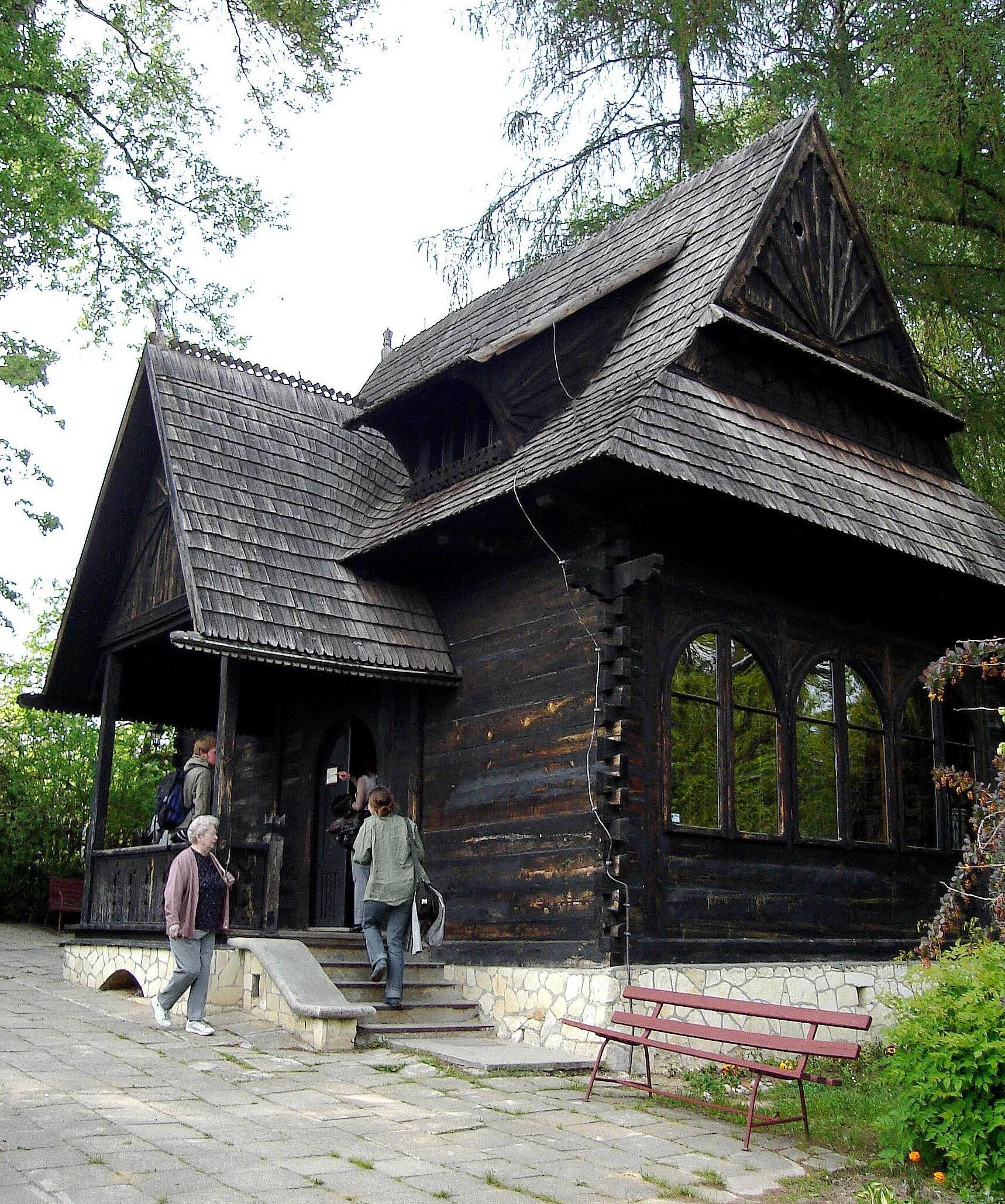
Chata ("Cottage"), Żeromski's house at Nałęczów

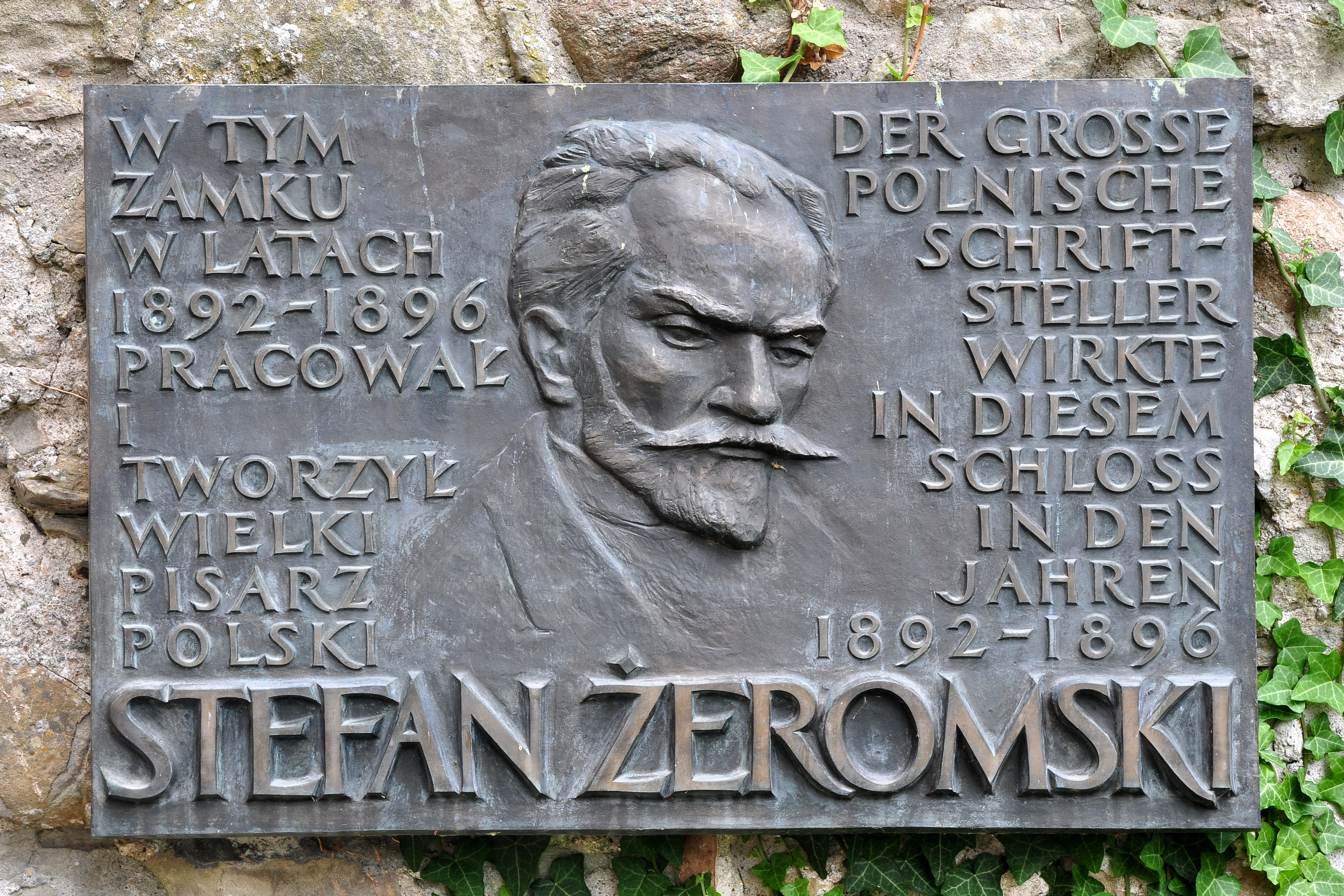
Plaque at Rapperswil Castle commemorating Żeromski

Stefan Żeromski ( [ˈstɛfan ʐɛˈrɔmski]; 14 October 1864 – 20 November 1925) was a Polish novelist and dramatist belonging to the Young Poland movement at the turn of the 20th century. He was called the "conscience of Polish literature".

He also wrote under the pen names Maurycy Zych, Józef Katerla, and Stefan Iksmoreż.

He was nominated four times for the Nobel Prize in Literature.

== Life ==
Stefan Żeromski was born on 14 October 1864 at Strawczyn, near Kielce.

Żeromski's parents died young, leaving him living in an impoverished state. He studied at the Kielce Municipal High School. He served as a tutor giving private lessons in 1888. In 1890, he obtained a job in Nałęczów, a spa town that attracted many intellectuals, artists and writers.

On 2 September 1892, he married a widow, Oktawia Rodkiewicz, née Radziwiłłowicz, whom he had met at a spa in Nałęczów, co-owned by her stepfather. One of the witnesses at the wedding was the novelist Bolesław Prus, an admirer of Oktawia's who had not been in favor of the marriage.

The newlyweds moved to Switzerland, where Żeromski worked from 1892 to 1896 as a librarian at the Polish National Museum in Rapperswil . At Oktawia's request Prus, though no admirer of Żeromski's writings, helped the struggling couple as much as he could.

In 1913 Żeromski started a new family with the painter Anna Zawadzka, whom he had met in 1908; they had a daughter, Monika.

In 1924, in recognition of Żeromski's achievements, President Stanisław Wojciechowski gave him a three-room apartment on the second floor of Warsaw's Royal Castle.

In the same year, Żeromski was shortlisted for the Nobel Prize in literature.

He died on 20 November 1925 in Warsaw.

In 2018, at a ceremony held at the Royal Castle in Warsaw on the 100th anniversary of Poland regaining its independence, Polish President Andrzej Duda posthumously conferred the country's highest distinction, the Order of the White Eagle, upon 25 distinguished Poles including Żeromski.

== Selected works ==
- Twilight (Zmierzch, short story, 1892)
- Ravens and Crows Will Peck Us to Pieces (Rozdziobią nas kruki, wrony, 1895)
- Doctor Peter (Doktor Piotr, 1895)
- The Labors of Sisyphus (Syzyfowe prace, 1898), about 19th- and 20th-century Tsarist efforts to russify the Russian-occupied part of Poland)
- Homeless People (Ludzie bezdomni, 1899)
- Ashes (Popioły, 1904)
- Forest Echoes (Echa leśne, 1905)
- The Wages of Sin (Dzieje grzechu, 1908)
- Elegy for a Hetman (Duma o hetmanie, 1908)
- The Rose (Róża, 1909)
- Sułkowski (1910)
- The Faithful River (Wierna rzeka, 1912)
- The Charm of Life (Uroda życia, 1912)
- Struggles with Satan (Walka z szatanem, vols. 1-2, 1916; vol. 3, 1919)
- Wind from the Sea (Wiatr od morza, 1922)
- My Quail Has Fled (Uciekła mi przepióreczka, 1924)
- The Spring to Come (Przedwiośnie, 1924)
- Journals (Dzienniki, published posthumously, 1953-1956)

Żeromski's works have been translated into several languages. They have been translated into Croatian by a member of the Croatian Academy, Stjepan Musulin.

=== Films ===
Several of Żeromski's novels have been filmed, by Walerian Borowczyk (Dzieje grzechu, "A Story of Sin"), Andrzej Wajda (Popioły, "Ashes"), and Filip Bajon (Przedwiośnie, "The Spring to Come"). In 2000, The Labors of Sisyphus (Syzyfowe prace), was adapted into a film of the same name by Paweł Komorowski.

== See also ==
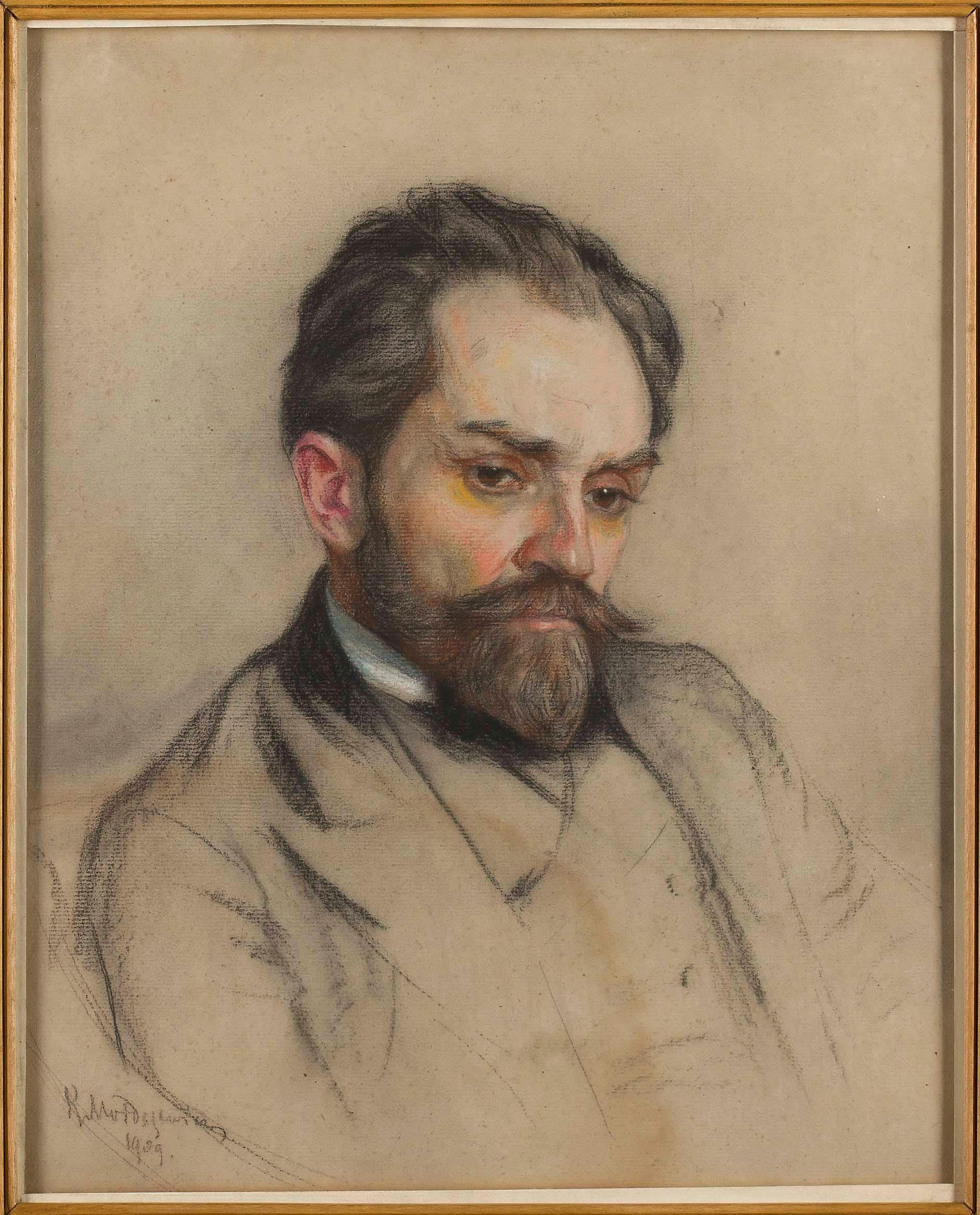
Stefan Żeromski

- Young Poland
- Republic of Zakopane
- List of Poles
