= Lešnica =

Lešnica (Лешница) is a South Slavic toponym which may refer to:

- Lešnica, Gostivar, a village in North Macedonia
- Lešnica, Kičevo, a village in North Macedonia
- Lešnica, Serbia, a village near Loznica
- Lešnica, Ormož, a village in Slovenia
- Lešnica, Novo Mesto, a village in Slovenia
- Lešnica (Sava), a creek in Upper Carniola, Slovenia, a tributary of the Sava
- Lešnica (Drava), a creek in Styria, Slovenia, a tributary of the Drava
- Lešnica (Krka), a creek in Lower Carniola, Slovenia, a tributary of the Krka
- Mala Lešnica, a village near Delnice, Croatia
- Lešnica (Loznica), settlement in Loznica, Serbia
- Lešnica (Albania), settlement in Pogradec, Albania
- Jadranska Lešnica, settlement in Loznica, Serbia
- Gorna Lešnica, settlement in Želino, Northern Macedonia
- Dolna Lešnica, settlement in Želino, Northern Macedonia
- Lešnica (Šar Mountains), valley of Šar Mountains, Northern Macedonia

== See also ==
- Leshnitsa
- Lesnica (disambiguation)
- Lješnica (disambiguation)
- Leshnitsa in Bulgaria
- Lesnica (Trgovište) in Serbia
