= Lesnica =

Lesnica is a Slavic toponym which may refer to the following places:

== Slovakia ==
- Lesnica (Slovakia), a village in Slovakia

== Serbia ==
- Lesnica (Trgovište), Serbia
- Lešnica (disambiguation)

== Poland ==
- Leśnica, a town in Opole Voivodeship (south Poland)
- Leśnica, a district of Wrocław, Poland
- Leśnica, Greater Poland Voivodeship (west-central Poland)
- Leśnica, Tatra County in Lesser Poland Voivodeship (south Poland)
- Leśnica, Wadowice County in Lesser Poland Voivodeship (south Poland)
- Leśnica, Łódź Voivodeship (central Poland)
- Leśnica, Podlaskie Voivodeship (north-east Poland)
- Leśnica, Świętokrzyskie Voivodeship (south-central Poland)
- Leśnica, Warmian-Masurian Voivodeship (north Poland)
- Leśnica, West Pomeranian Voivodeship (north-west Poland)

== Bulgaria ==
- Leshnitsa (disambiguation)

== See also ==
- Lješnica (disambiguation)
