= Podhale =

Region of Poland

Coordinates: 49°28′45″N 20°01′45″E

Podhale Podhole
- Ethnocultural region
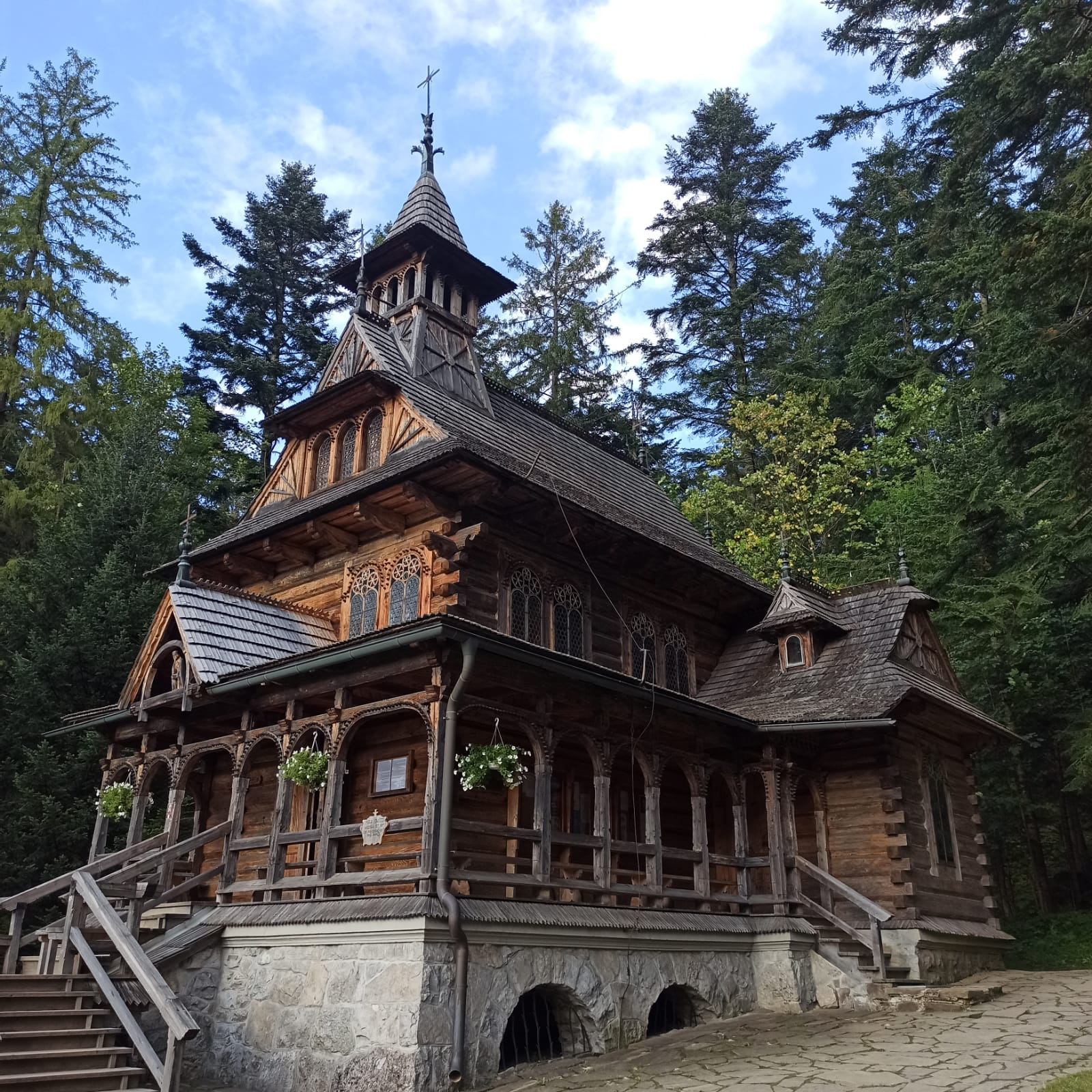
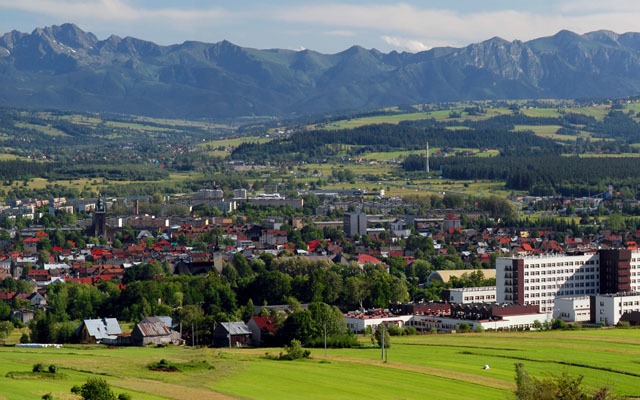
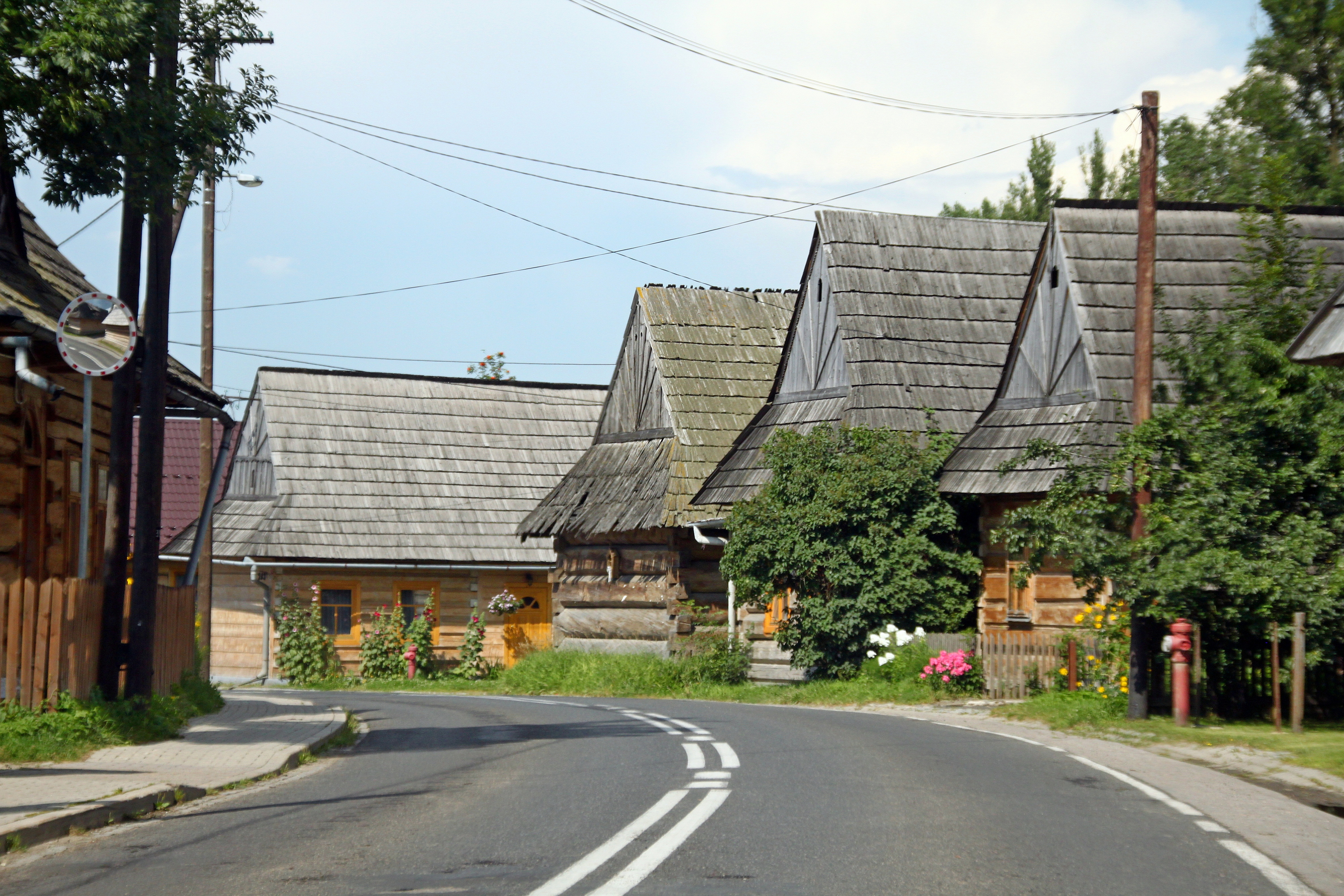
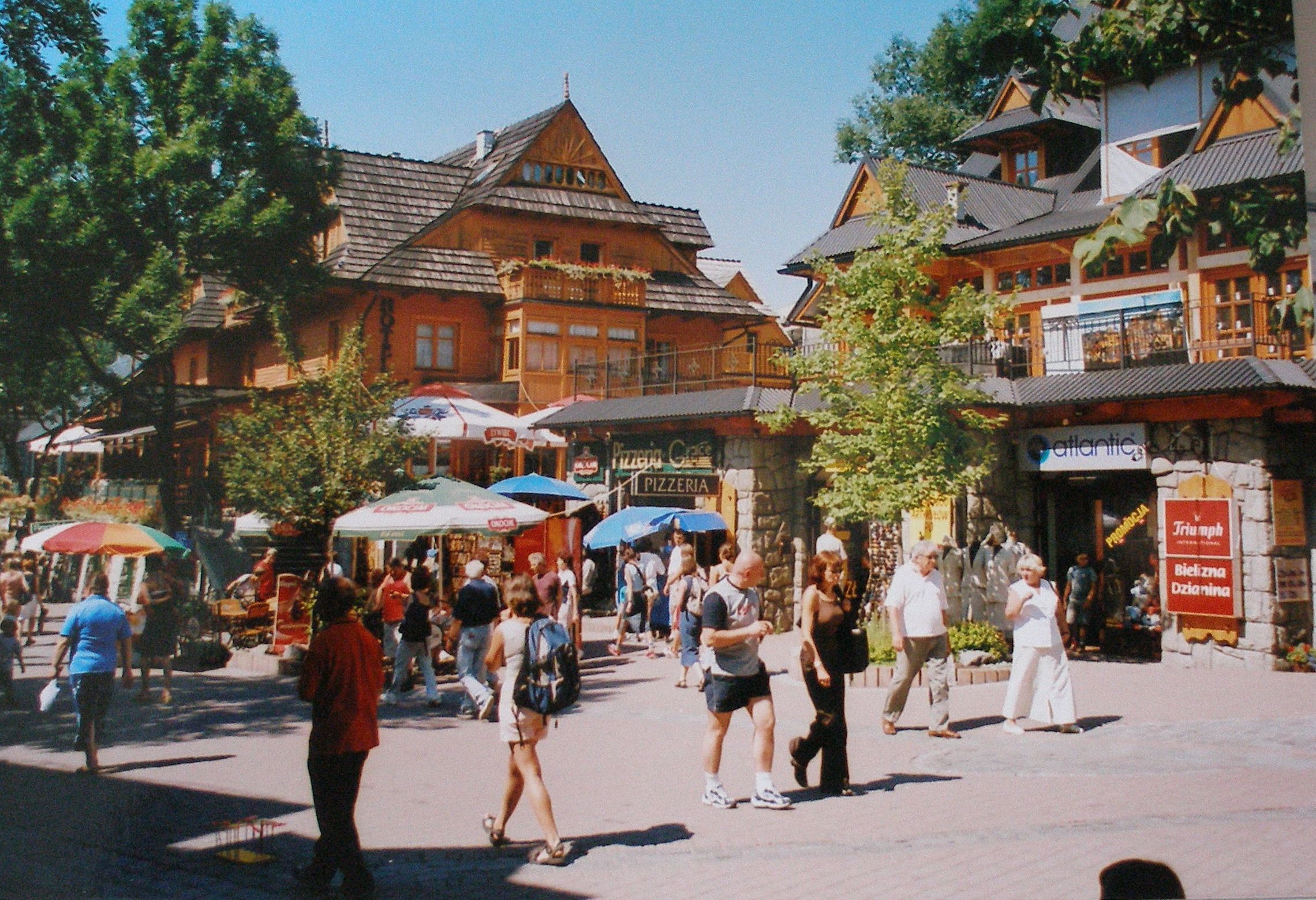
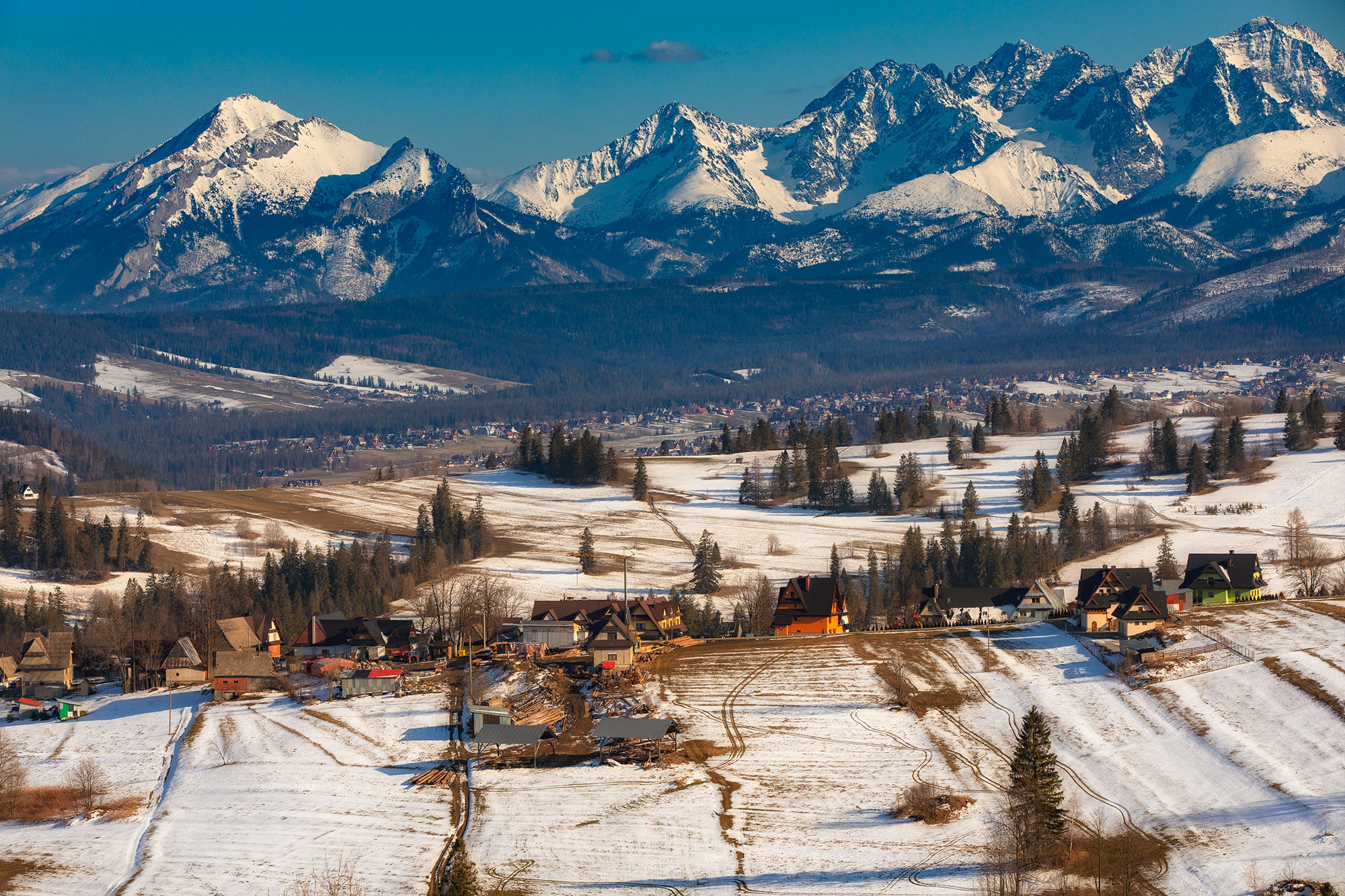
- Jaszczurówka chapel Nowy Targ The wooden village of Chochołów Zakopane Tatras seen from Podhale

- Location of Podhale (shown in red) on the map of Poland
- Country: Poland
- Voivodeship: Lesser Poland
- Historic capital: Nowy Targ
- Cities and towns: Nowy Targ, Zakopane, Czarny Dunajec, Rabka-Zdrój
- Demonym: Podhalan
- Time zone: UTC+1 (CET)
  - Summer (DST): UTC+2 (CEST)

Podhale (Polish pronunciation: [pɔtˈxalɛ]; Podhale dialect: Podhole lit. 'below the mountain pastures'), sometimes referred to as the Polish Highlands, is Poland's southernmost region. The Podhale is located in the foothills of the Tatra range of the Carpathian Mountains. It is the most famous of the many Goral lands and is the region with which Gorals are commonly associated in general. It is part of historic Lesser Poland.

== Location ==
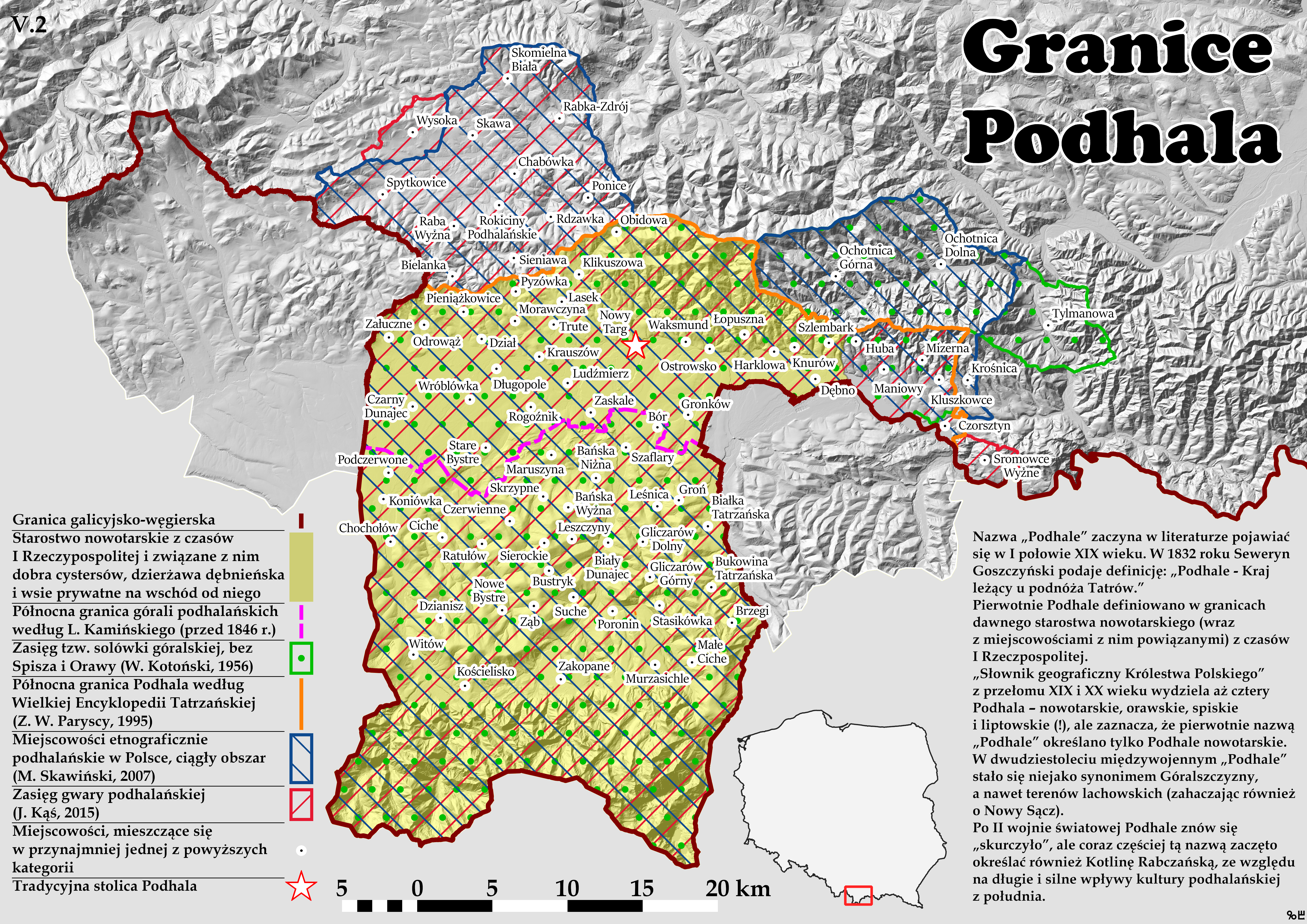
Map of Podhale (different criteria)

The northern border of Podhale is formed by the Gorce Mountains. The landscape of Podhale features extensive peat bogs and alluvial fans.

The southern part of Podhale is sometimes called Skalne Podhale – it covers the area from Brzegi and Bukowina to Zakopane, Kościelisko, and Witów. The remaining part is called Niżne Podhale.

The largest towns and villages: Nowy Targ (the historical capital of Podhale), Czarny Dunajec, Ludźmierz, Zakopane, Biały Dunajec, Szaflary, Białka Tatrzańska, Bukowina Tatrzańska, Poronin, Chochołów, Witów, Gronków, and others.

Municipalities (gminas), towns and villages of Podhale:

- gmina Biały Dunajec
- gmina Bukowina Tatrzańska
- gmina Czarny Dunajec
- gmina Czorsztyn (disputed)
- gmina Kościelisko
- Nowy Targ (gmina)
- Nowy Targ
- gmina Ochotnica Dolna (disputed, often considered its own Goral ethnographic group)
- gmina Poronin
- gmina Raba Wyżna (disputed)
- Rabka-Zdrój (gmina) (disputed)
- Rabka-Zdrój (disputed)
- Skomielna Biała (disputed)
- gmina Szaflary
- gmina Spytkowice (disputed)
- Wysoka (Sucha County) (disputed, linguistically)
- Zakopane

The exact borders of Podhale are disputed and unclear due to cultural expansion and blending in border regions with other Goral groups.

According to the book Wskazania by Władysław Orkan, Podhale can also include Mszana Dolna together with its gmina, as well as the poet's native areas in the neighboring Gmina Niedźwiedź. However, this nomenclature is now considered outdated. These areas are currently seen as a distinct Zagórze Goral region.

== Folklore ==
The region is characterized by its unique Goral folklore, which is distinct from other folk cultures in Poland. Its folklore was brought there mainly by settlers from the Lesser Poland region further north and partly by Vlach settlers in the 14th–17th centuries during their migrations.

The Podhale dialect of Polish as well as standard Polish are spoken in the region, with the dialect being uniquely alive compared to other Polish dialects with it having a strong speaker basis and literary tradition in the region.

== Regional attractions ==
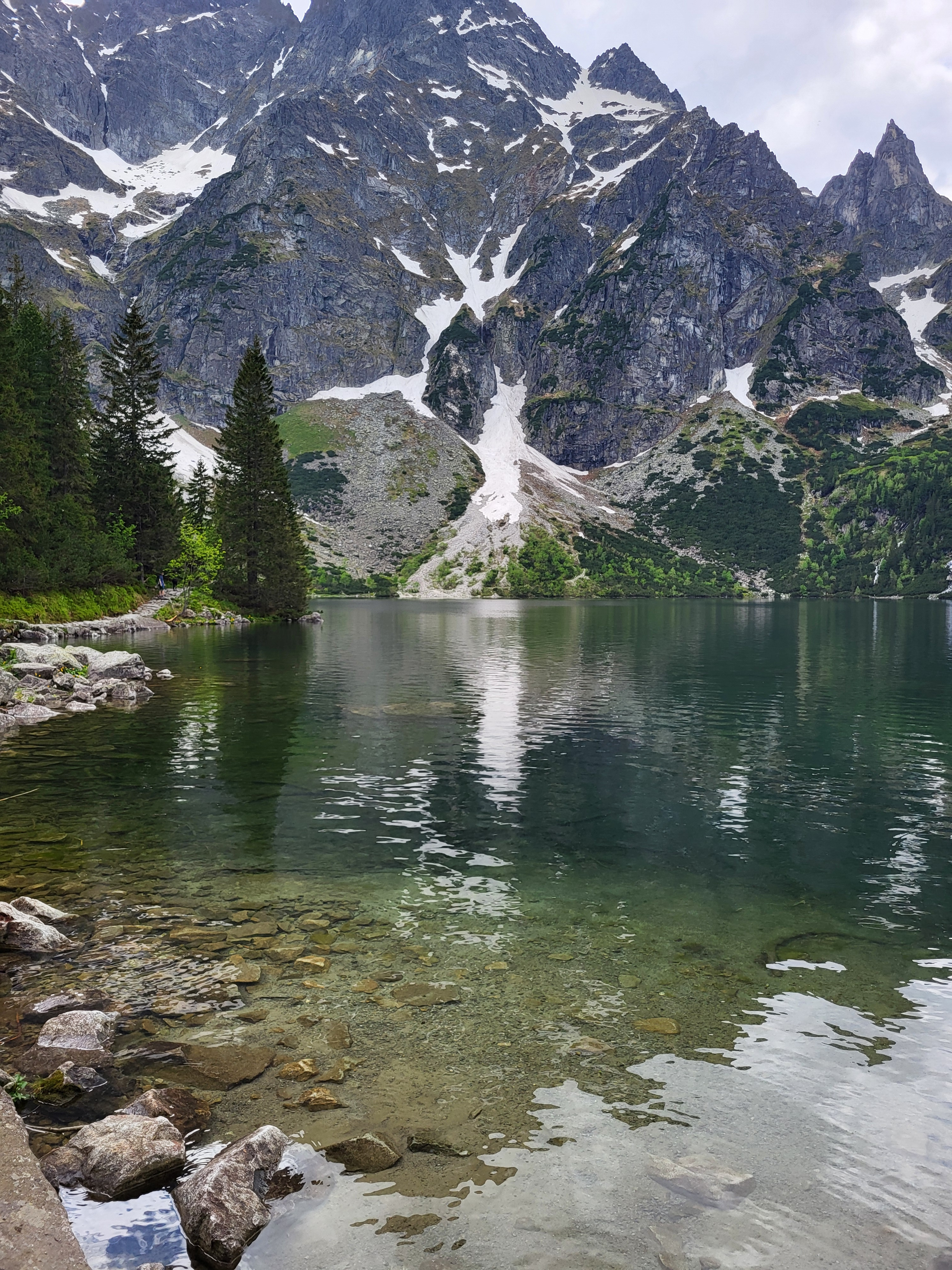
Eye of the Sea

The region is known for its views, proximity to the Tatra mountains, numerous thermal baths and romanticised culture making Podhale a popular tourist destination. Among the region's attractions are the mountain resort of Zakopane and the lake known as Morskie Oko ("The Eye of the Sea"), which local legend claims, is connected to the Adriatic by subterranean passageways. Nowy Targ along the Dunajec River, located in the valley beneath the Gorce Mountains, is the capital of the region. Ludzmierz is home to the area's oldest shrine, Our Lady of Ludźmierz also known as the Hostess of Podhale or in Goral Gaździna Podholańsko.

The region is known for its oscypek (a cheese made from a mix of cow's and sheep's milk), music and ski slopes.

== See also ==
- Czorsztyn
- Dunajec River Gorge
- Folk costumes of Podhale
- Gorals
- Polish Tatra Sheepdog
- Sanctuary of Our Lady of Ludźmierz
- Zakopane Style
- Janosik
- Mała Armia Janosika
