= Wojciech Kułach =

- Born: March 24, 1812; Gliczarów
- Died: December 23, 1897 (aged 85)
- Other name: Wawrzyńcok
- Occupations: Sculptor, artist
- Relatives: Piotr Kułach (brother)

Wojciech Kułach, known as Wawrzyńcok (born March 24, 1812, in Gliczarów, died December 23, 1897) was a Polish folk sculptor active in the Podhale region in the 19th century. He worked with wood, stone, and metal.

In the year 1840, he created a bust for the monument to Archduke Franz Karl of Austria in a competition, for which he received the first prize.

He was nicknamed the "Leonardo da Vinci of Gliczarów." Kułach's sketches can be viewed in Gliczarów Górny in the memorial room of Andrzej Skupień Florek.

== Notable works ==
- Cross above Czarny Staw pod Rysami
- Wayside shrines on private properties in Biały Dunajec
- Crucified Christ, St. John, and the Virgin Mary in the rectory of the church in Ludźmierz
- Virgin Mary in Janiłowa Kaplica on Koszarkowy Wierch
- Virgin Mary with the Child in the new church in Białka Tatrzańska
- Three altars in the old church on Kościeliska Street in Zakopane.
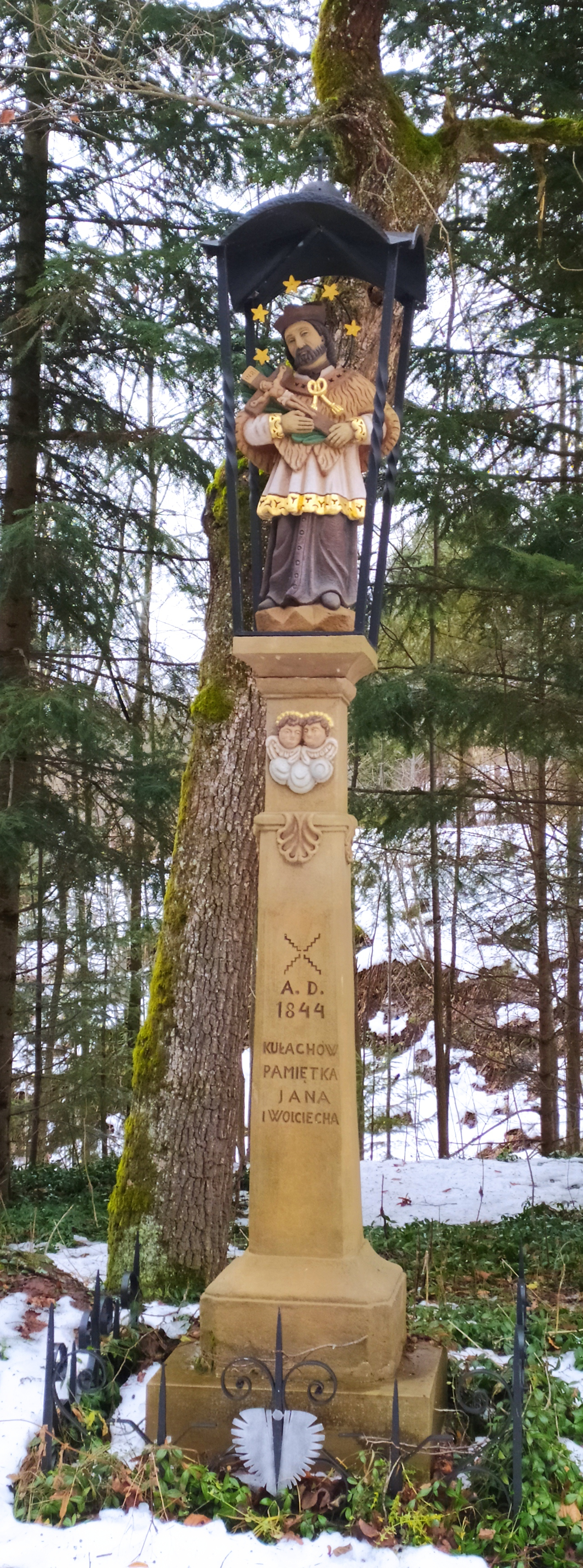
John of Nepomuk in Gliczarów Dolny, 1844, artist Wojciech Kułach

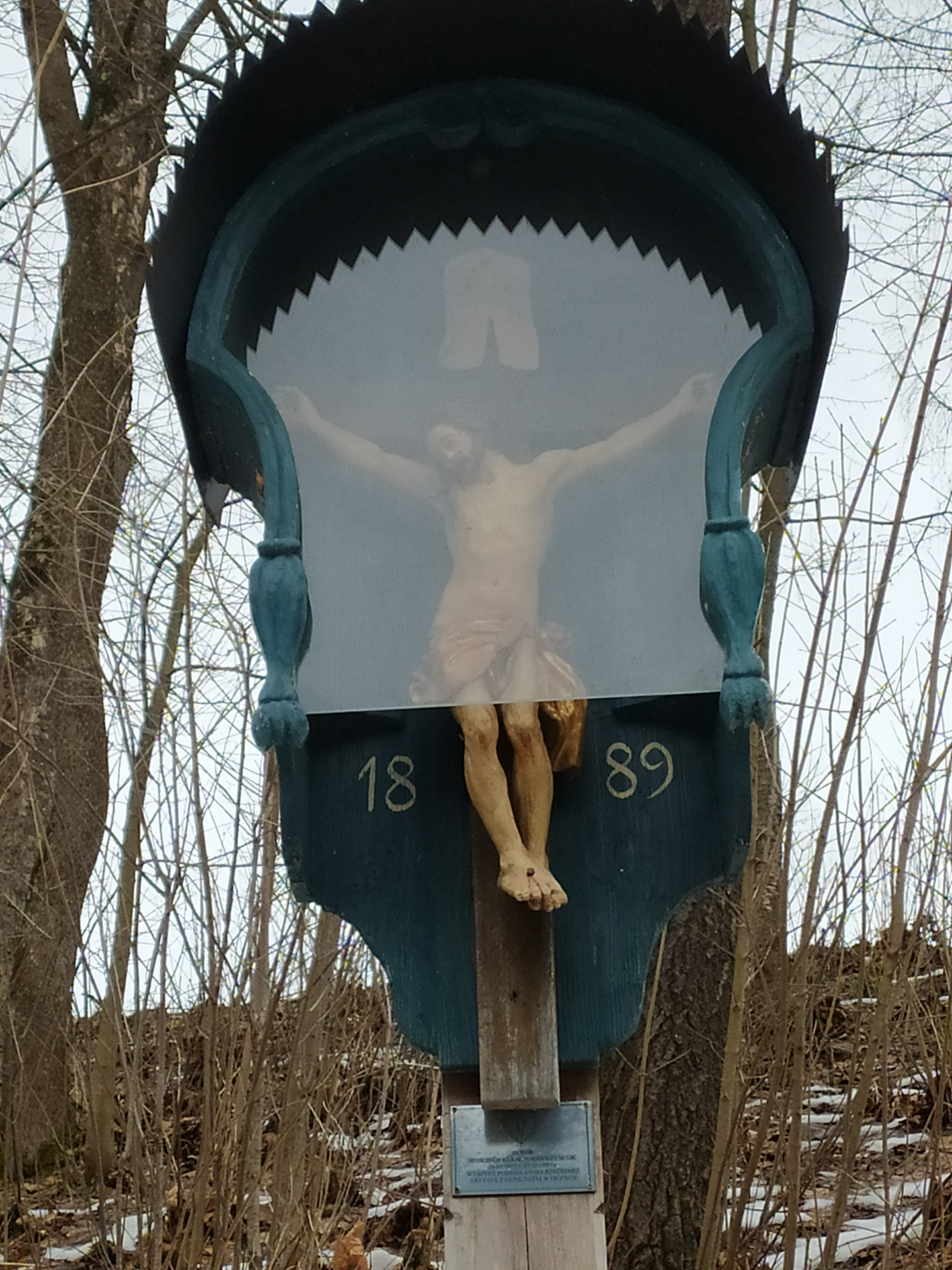
Jesus Christ, 1899, artist Wojciech Kułach
