= Larce =

Larce Ларце Llërcë
- Village
- Location within North Macedonia
- Coordinates: 41°56′N 21°08′E
- Country: North Macedonia
- Region: Polog
- Municipality: Želino

Population (2021)
  - Total: 1,850
- Time zone: UTC+1 (CET)
  - Summer (DST): UTC+2 (CEST)
- Car plates: TE
- Website: .

Larce (Macedonian: Ларце, Albanian: Llërcë) is a village in the municipality of Želino, North Macedonia.

== Demographics ==
As of the 2021 census, Larce had 1,850 residents with the following ethnic composition:

- Albanians 1,804
- Persons for whom data are taken from administrative sources 46

According to the 2002 census, the village had a total of 1,868 inhabitants. Ethnic groups in the village include:

- Albanians 1,859
- Macedonians 5
- Bosniaks 1
- Others 2
