= Gliczarów =

Gliczarów may refer to the following places in Poland:

- Gliczarów Dolny
- Gliczarów Górny
