= Ozormište =

Ozormište Озормиште Uzurmisht
- Village
- Location within North Macedonia
- Coordinates: 42°01′N 21°04′E
- Country: North Macedonia
- Region: Polog
- Municipality: Želino

Population (2021)
  - Total: 818
- Time zone: UTC+1 (CET)
  - Summer (DST): UTC+2 (CEST)
- Car plates: TE
- Website: .

Ozormište (Macedonian: Озормиште, Albanian: Uzurmisht) is a village in the municipality of Želino, North Macedonia.

== Demographics ==
Ozormište is attested in the 1467/68 Ottoman tax registry (defter) for the Nahiyah of Kalkandelen. The village had a total of 20 Christian households, 2 bachelors and 3 widows.

As of the 2021 census, Ozormište had 818 residents with the following ethnic composition:

- Albanians 806
- Persons for whom data are taken from administrative sources 10
- Macedonians 2

According to the 2002 census, the village had a total of 1219 inhabitants. Ethnic groups in the village include:

- Albanians 1208
- Others 11

According to the 1942 Albanian census, Ozormište was inhabited by 137 Muslim Albanians and 23 Serbs.
