= Jurgów =

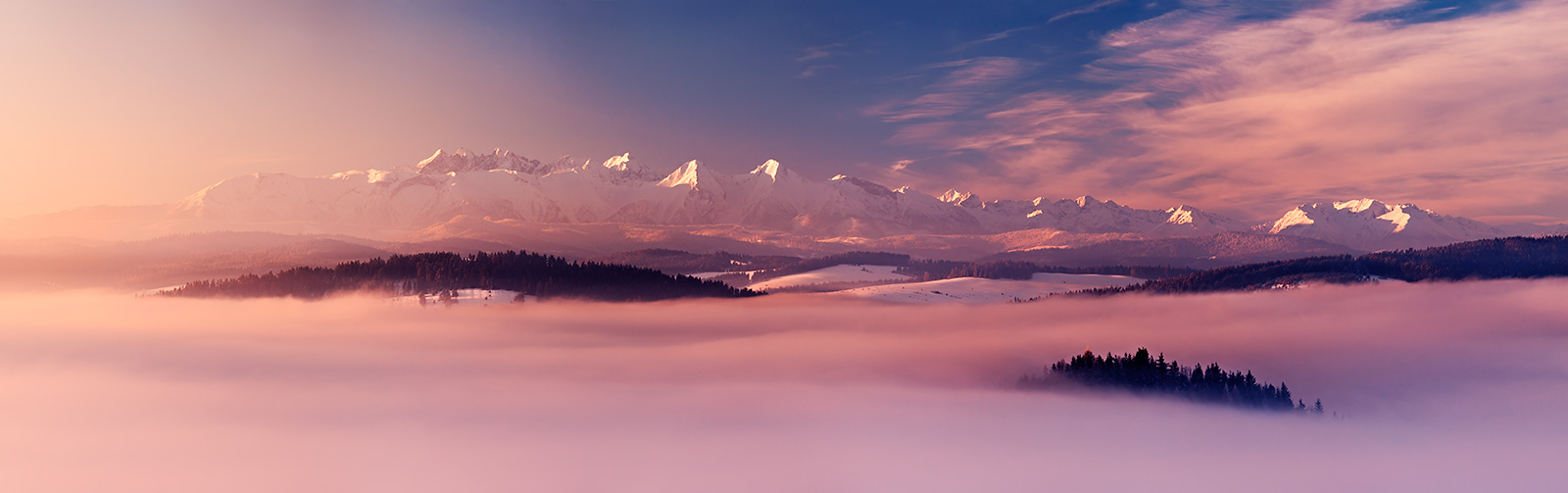
- Tatras seen from Jurgów

- Location within Poland
- Coordinates: 49°21′N 20°8′E
- Country: Poland
- Voivodeship: Lesser Poland
- County: Tatra
- Gmina: Bukowina Tatrzańska

Area
  - Total: 7.68 km^{2} (2.97 sq mi)

Population (2005)
  - Total: 903
  - Density: 118/km^{2} (305/sq mi)
- Time zone: UTC+1 (CET)
  - Summer (DST): UTC+2 (CEST)
- Postal code: 34-532
- Area code: +48 18
- Car plates: KTT
- Website: www.jurgow.pl

Jurgów [ˈjurɡuf] (Slovak: Jurgov) is a village in the Spisz region of southern Poland, near the border with Slovakia and the town of Bukowina Tatrzańska, on the Białka river.

== History ==
It was founded in 1546 on Vlach law in the possessions of the Niedzica Castle (also known as the Dunajec Castle). At that time it belonged to the Kingdom of Hungary, although the owner of the area was then a Polish magnate Olbracht Łaski. According to legend, the settler of the village was a highlander robber called Jurko, hence the name of the village. The documents from the period 1589-1595 related to the sale of the Niedzica possessions by Olbracht Łaski to György Horváth, the village is mentioned in Hungarian as Gyurgow. After the I World War in when the Austria-Hungary ceased to exist, the village became part of newly independent Poland. In 1939 when Nazi Germany and Slovakia invaded Poland it was occupied by Slovakia. After the war it returned in 1945 to Poland.

It is one of the 14 villages in the Polish part of the historical region of Spiš (Polish: Spisz).

== Sights and attractions ==
- The beautiful and historic St Sebastian wooden church from about 1670. It is made completely of wood and is still in use today. The church has twice been rebuilt: first in 1811 and again in 1869. It is surrounded by large, very old trees. The walls and roof of the church are faced with wooden shingles, and it has a Rococo-style interior, including many carved figures of angels, saints, etc.
- A group of shepherds' huts in the "Podokólne" clearing. Grazing cows and sheep was a primary occupation of Jurgów's villagers, who owned a lot of pastureland in the Tatra mountains where they grazed their flocks, and had many shepherd's huts. After they lost their pastures in the Tatras, they moved their various structures down from the mountains and assembled them in a nearby clearing. They use these to shelter their cows and sheep from spring through autumn. Some people also stay there for a time during the same period.
- An old water-powered sawmill, which is still in use today.
- Sołtys's croft, which is currently a part of the Tatra Museum in Zakopane.

== Gallery ==
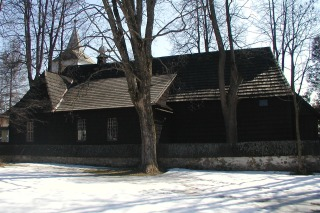
Wooden church in Jurgów
