= Kopačin Dol =

Kopačin Dol Копачин Дол Kapazhdoll
- Village
- Location within North Macedonia
- Coordinates: 41°58′N 21°08′E
- Country: North Macedonia
- Region: Polog
- Municipality: Želino

Population (2021)
  - Total: 818
- Time zone: UTC+1 (CET)
  - Summer (DST): UTC+2 (CEST)
- Car plates: TE
- Website: .

Kopačin Dol (Macedonian: Копачин Дол, Albanian: Kapazhdoll) is a village in the municipality of Želino, North Macedonia.

== History ==
According to the 1467-68 Ottoman defter, Kopačin Dol exhibits Christian Slavic anthroponomy.

== Demographics ==
As of the 2021 census, Kopačin Dol had 818 residents with the following ethnic composition:

- Albanians 753
- Persons for whom data are taken from administrative sources 64
- Others 1

According to the 2002 census, the village had a total of 907 inhabitants. Ethnic groups in the village include:

- Albanians 898
- Others 9
