= Rogle, Želino =

Rogle Рогле Roglë
- Village
- Location within North Macedonia
- Coordinates: 41°58′N 21°10′E
- Country: North Macedonia
- Region: Polog
- Municipality: Želino

Population (2021)
  - Total: 532
- Time zone: UTC+1 (CET)
  - Summer (DST): UTC+2 (CEST)
- Car plates: TE
- Website: .

Rogle (Macedonian: Рогле, Albanian: Roglë) is a village in the municipality of Želino, North Macedonia.

== Demographics ==
As of the 2021 census, Rogle had 532 residents with the following ethnic composition:

- Albanians 492
- Persons for whom data are taken from administrative sources 40

According to the 2002 census, the village had a total of 566 inhabitants. Ethnic groups in the village include:

- Albanians 556
- Others 10
