= Strimnica =

Strimnica Стримница Strimnicë / Strimnajcë
- Village
- Location within North Macedonia
- Coordinates: 41°58′N 21°02′E
- Country: North Macedonia
- Region: Polog
- Municipality: Želino

Population (2021)
  - Total: 1,937
- Time zone: UTC+1 (CET)
  - Summer (DST): UTC+2 (CEST)
- Car plates: TE
- Website: .

Strimnica (Macedonian: Стримница, Standard Albanian: Strimnicë, Gheg Albanian: Strimnajcë) is a village in the municipality of Želino, North Macedonia.

== History ==
Strimnica is attested in the 1467/68 Ottoman tax registry (defter) for the Nahiyah of Kalkandelen. The village had a total of 35 Christian households, 2 bachelors and 4 widows.

According to the 1467-68 Ottoman defter, Strimnica (Stromeshnica) exhibits Slavic Orthodox anthroponomy.

== Demographics ==
As of the 2021 census, Strimnica had 1,937 residents with the following ethnic composition:

- Albanians 1,862
- Persons for whom data are taken from administrative sources 74
- Others 1

According to the 2002 census, the village had a total of 2,422 inhabitants. Ethnic groups in the village include:

- Albanians 2,404
- Macedonians 2
- Others 16

According to the 1942 Albanian census, Strimnica was inhabited by 563 Muslim Albanians.
