= Gorna Lešnica =

Gorna Lešnica Горна Лешница Leshnicë e Epërme
- Village
- Location within North Macedonia
- Coordinates: 41°55′N 21°03′E
- Country: North Macedonia
- Region: Polog
- Municipality: Želino

Population (2021)
  - Total: 114
- Time zone: UTC+1 (CET)
  - Summer (DST): UTC+2 (CEST)
- Car plates: TE
- Website: .

Gorna Lešnica (Macedonian: Горна Лешница, Albanian: Leshnicë e Epërme) is a village in the municipality of Želino, North Macedonia.

== History ==
Gorna Lešnica is attested in the 1467/68 Ottoman tax registry (defter) for the Nahiyah of Kalkandelen. The village had a total of 75 Christian households and 5 bachelors.

== Demographics ==
As of the 2021 census, Gorna Lešnica had 114 residents with the following ethnic composition:

- Albanians 104
- Persons for whom data are taken from administrative sources 10

According to the 2002 census, the village had a total of 189 inhabitants. Ethnic groups in the village include:

- Albanians 188
- Macedonians 1

According to the 1942 Albanian census, Gorna Lešnica was inhabited by 326 Muslim Albanians.
