= Jánošík =

Jánošík can refer to:

- Adam Jánošík, Slovak professional ice hockey player
- Juraj Jánošík, a famous Slovak outlaw
  - Jánošík (1921 film), a Slovak film
  - Jánošík (1935 film), a Slovak film
  - Jánošík I, a Slovak film
  - Jánošík II, a Slovak film
  - Jánošík (1976 cartoon), a Slovak full-length cartoon
- Lukáš Jánošík (born 1994), a Slovak footballer
- Peter Jánošík (born 1988), a Slovak footballer

== See also ==
- Janosik (disambiguation)
- Janošik, a village in Serbia with Slovak ethnic majority
