= Dolna Lešnica =

Dolna Lešnica Долна Лешница Leshnicë e Poshtme
- Village
- Location within North Macedonia
- Coordinates: 41°57′N 21°04′E
- Country: North Macedonia
- Region: Polog
- Municipality: Želino

Population (2021)
  - Total: 430
- Time zone: UTC+1 (CET)
  - Summer (DST): UTC+2 (CEST)
- Car plates: TE
- Website: .

Dolna Lešnica (Macedonian: Долна Лешница, Albanian: Leshnicë e Poshtme) is a village in the municipality of Želino, North Macedonia.

== History ==
According to the 1467-68 Ottoman defter, Dolna Lešnica appears as being inhabited by an Orthodox Christian Albanian population. Some families had a mixed Slav-Albanian anthroponomy - usually a Slavic first name and an Albanian last name or last names with Albanian patronyms and Slavic suffixes. The names are: Nasuhaç, son of Kondo; Gjorgji, his son; Vinko, Nasuhaç's brother.

== Demographics ==
As of the 2021 census, Dolna Lešnica had 430 residents with the following ethnic composition:

- Albanians 415
- Persons for whom data are taken from administrative sources 15

According to the 2002 census, the village had a total of 625 inhabitants. Ethnic groups in the village include:

- Albanians 615
- Others 10

According to the 1942 Albanian census, Dolna Lešnica was inhabited by 140 Serbs and 117 Muslim Albanians.
