= Folk costumes of Podhale =

Folk attire of Podhale region

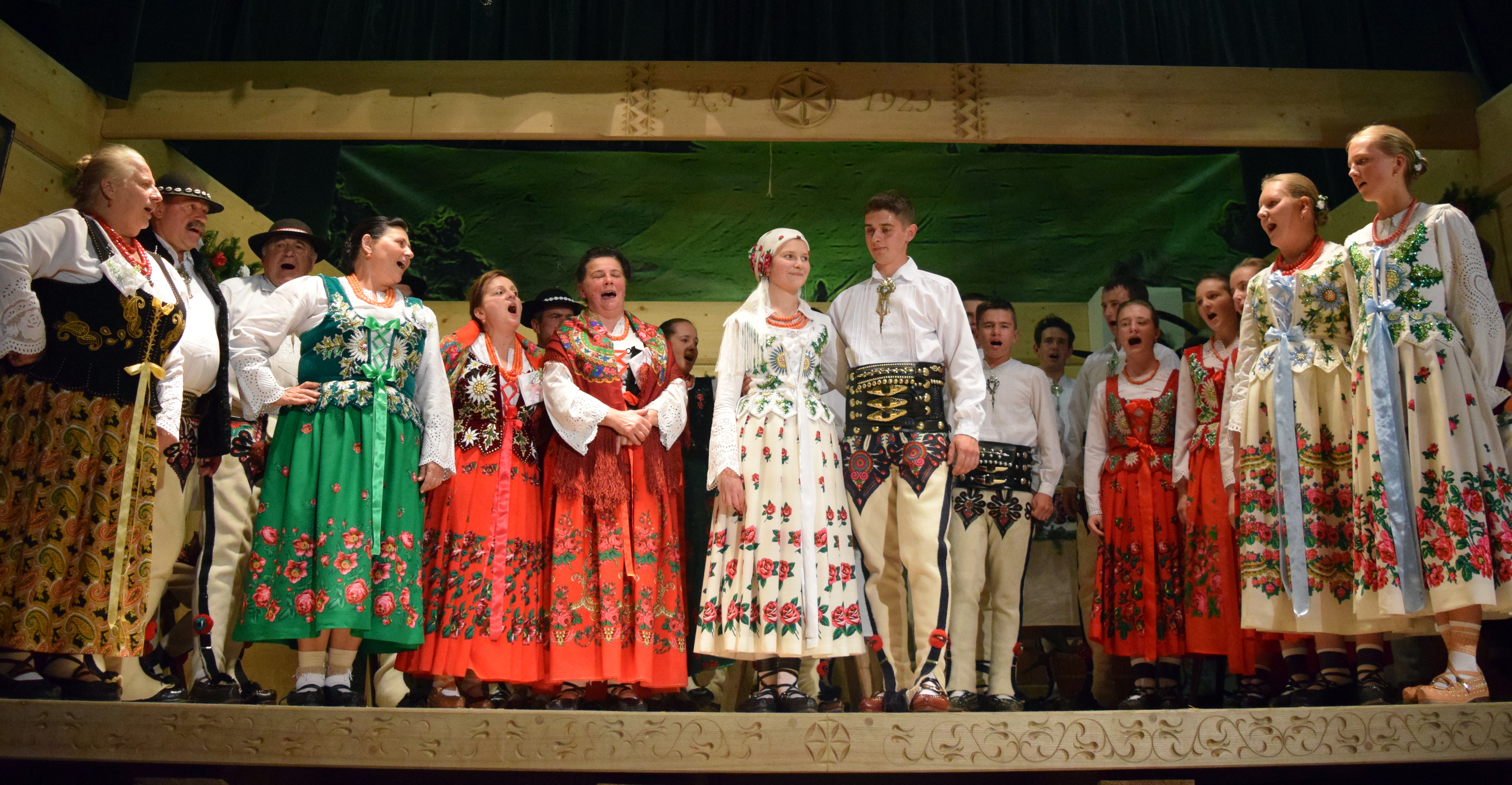
Traditional wedding outfit of Podhale Highlanders

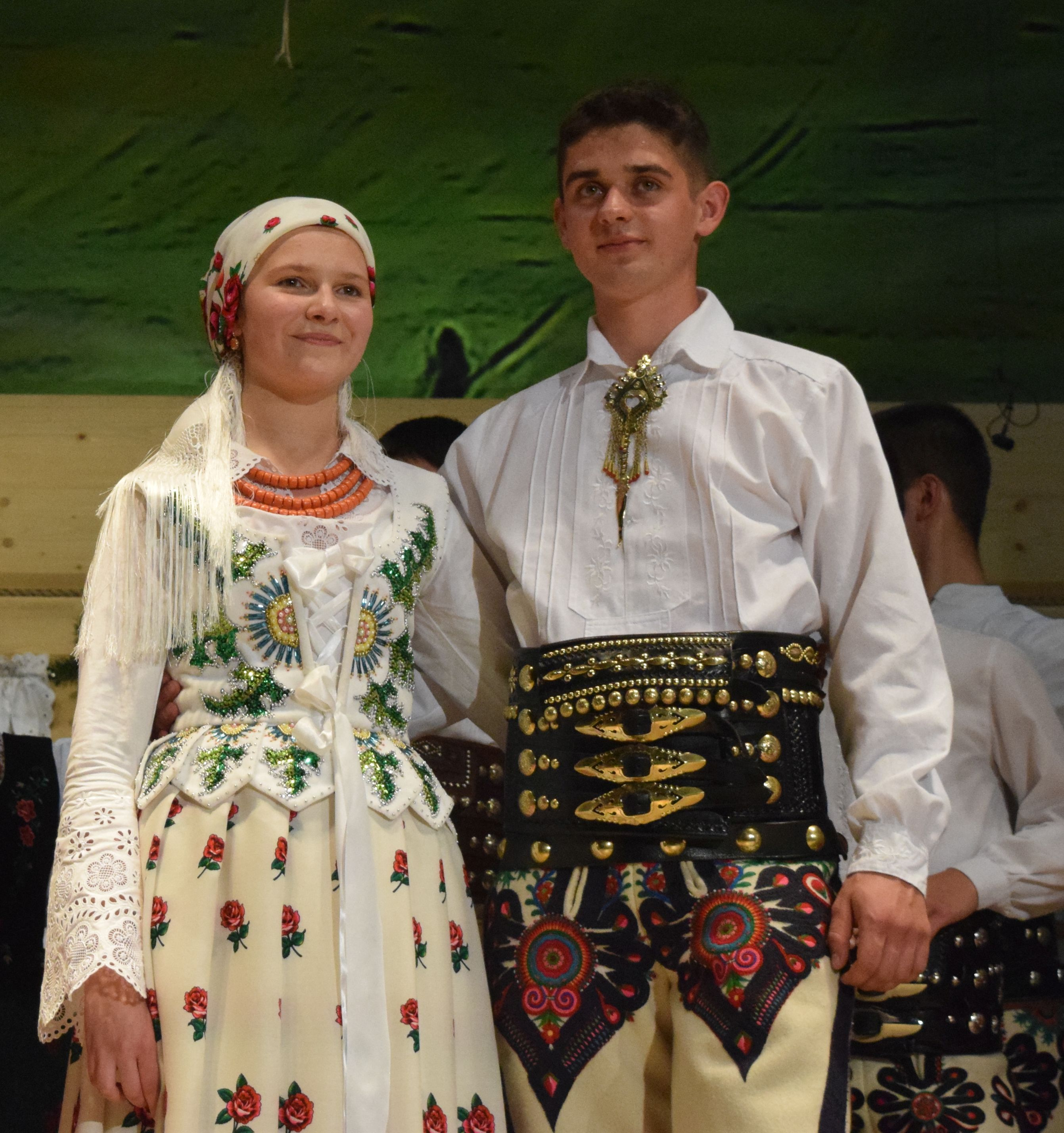
Folk costumes from Podhale region - female and male; contemporary design.

Making of traditional highlander clasp. At the goldsmith's workshop of Andrzej Wojtas. Poland, Bukowina Tatrzańska, Podhale region.

Folk costumes from Podhale region - costumes wear by Highlanders (Gorals) in Polish area of the Tatra Mountains, Podhale region. Unlike other regional groups in Poland, Highlanders from Podhale wear traditional outfit (or its elements) on a daily basis. This type of outfit is widely considered one of the Polish national costumes.

== Male attire ==
The most important elements of male attire are: trousers (portki) and a coat (cucha) made of woollen broadcloth, a leather vest (serdak), moccasins (kierpce) and a belt (trzos, opaska), shirt (koszula) made of homespun flaxen cloth and a black felt hat.

== Female attire ==
Female attire has been changed through the 19th and 20th century and in mid-19th century consisted of a percale shirt with wide sleeves, a decorated corset made of fabric, a wide percale skirt with floral motif, a muslin apron (fartuch), boots with high soles, trinkets or coral necklaces around the neck and a muslin (or tybet, or woollen) scarf worn on the head or over the shoulders. Women also wear the same type of shoes as man do - kierpce.

== Gallery ==
Traditional Men`s Clothing from Podhale region

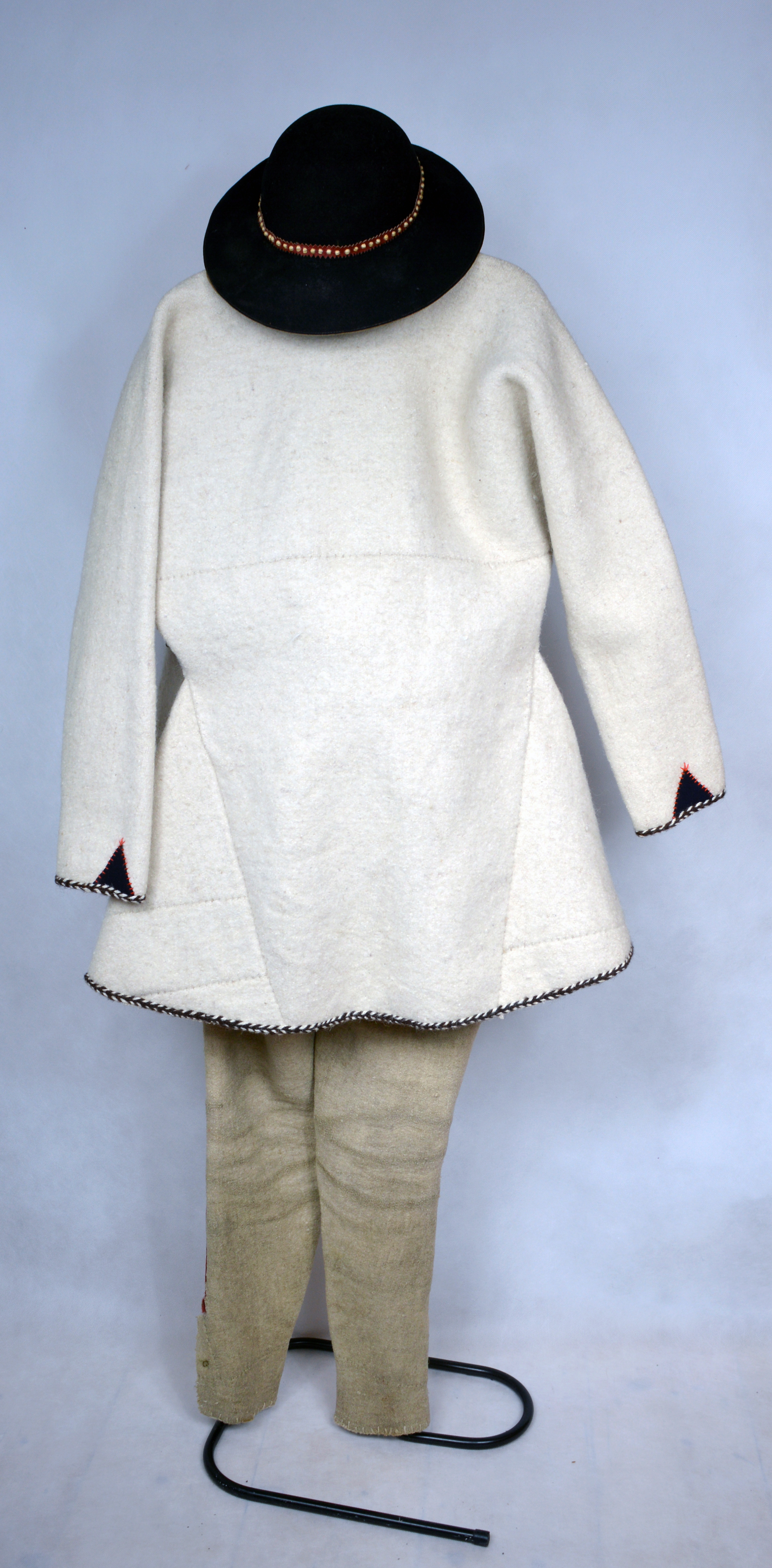
Traditional man's attire from Podhale region - back, with a hat (from the Tatra Museum's collection) - back view.

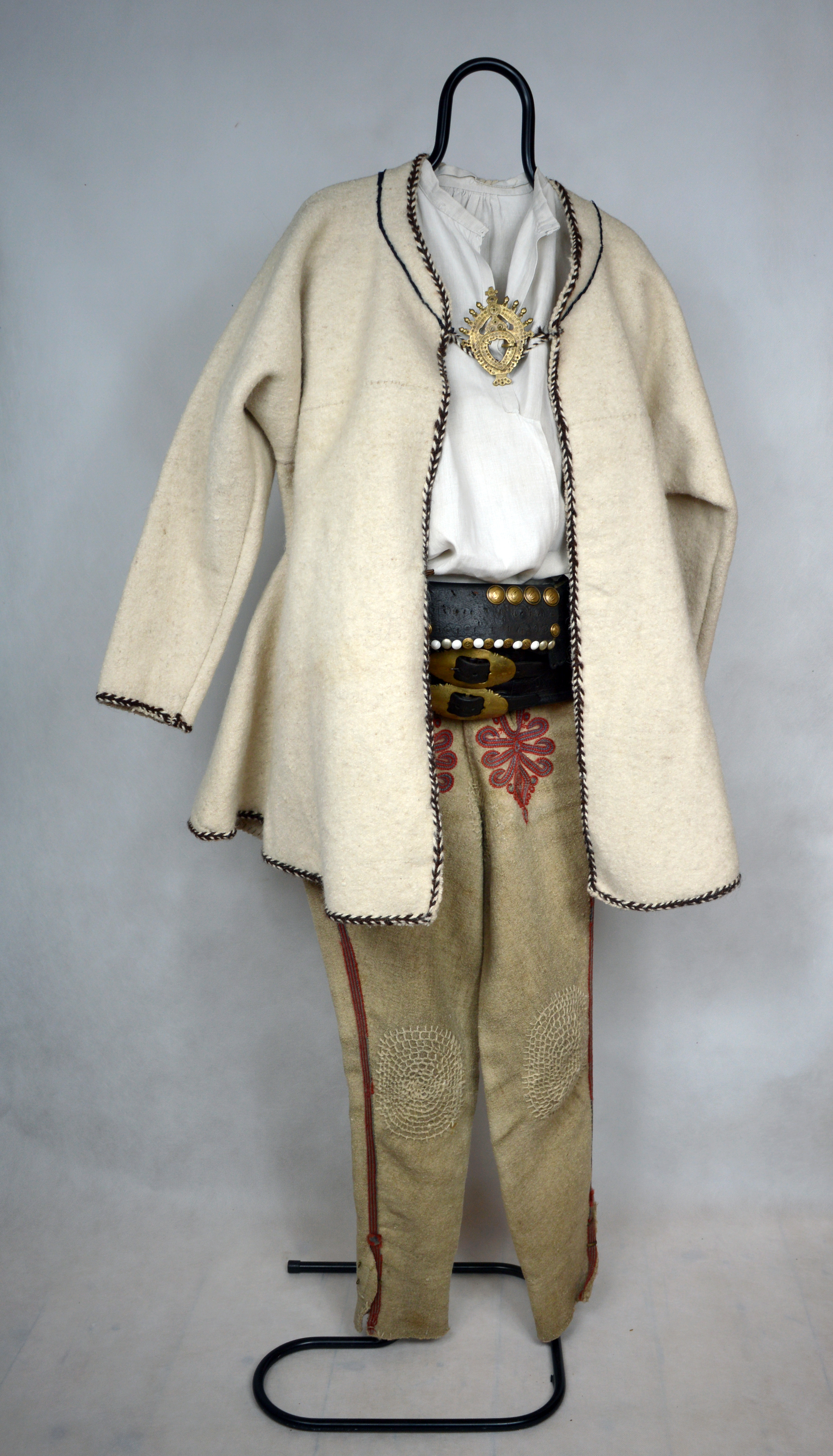
Traditional man's attire from Podhale region (from the Tatra Museum's collection) - front view.

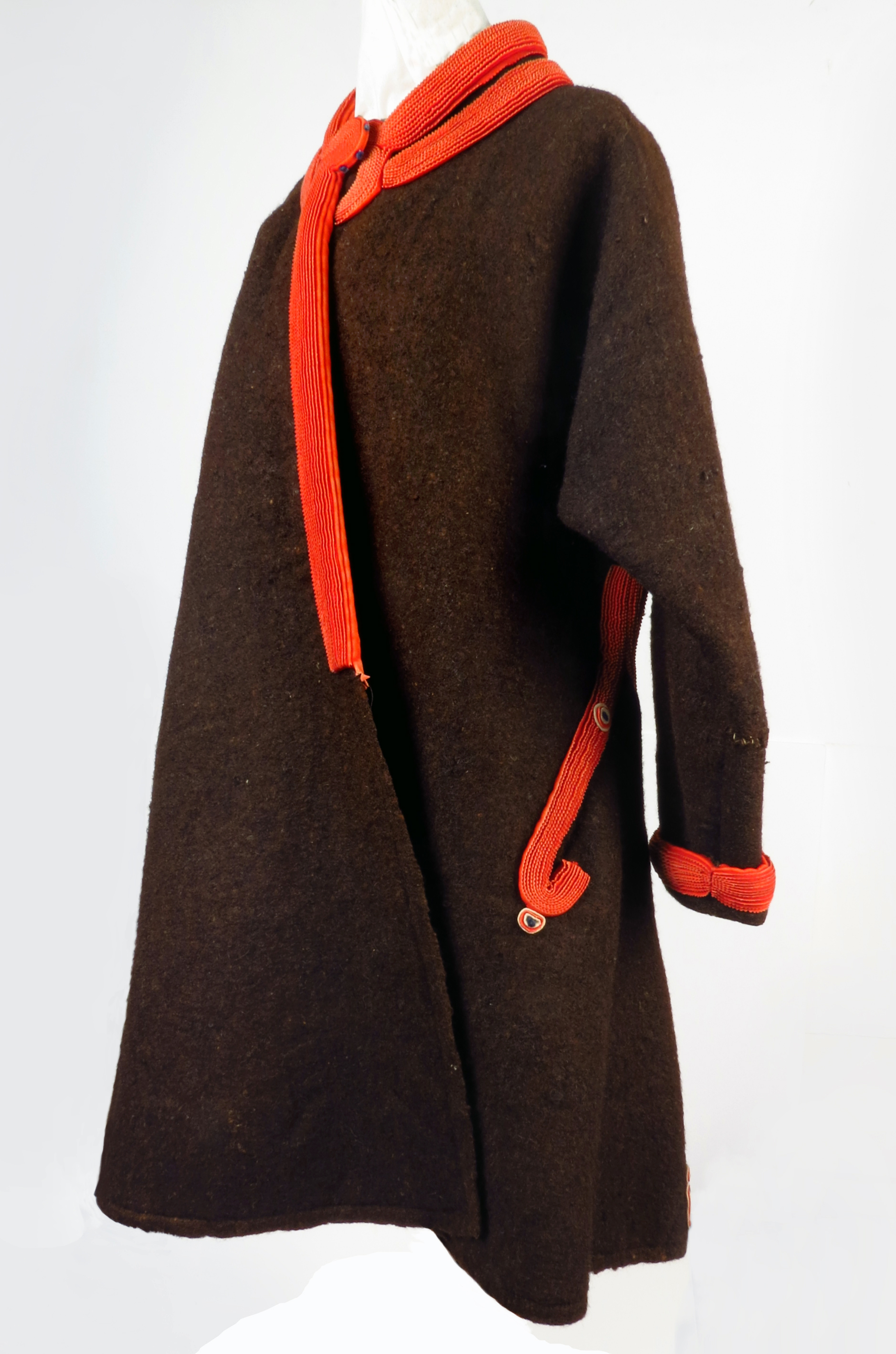
Traditional man's coat ('gunia', 'cucha') from Podhale region (from the Tatra Museum's collection)

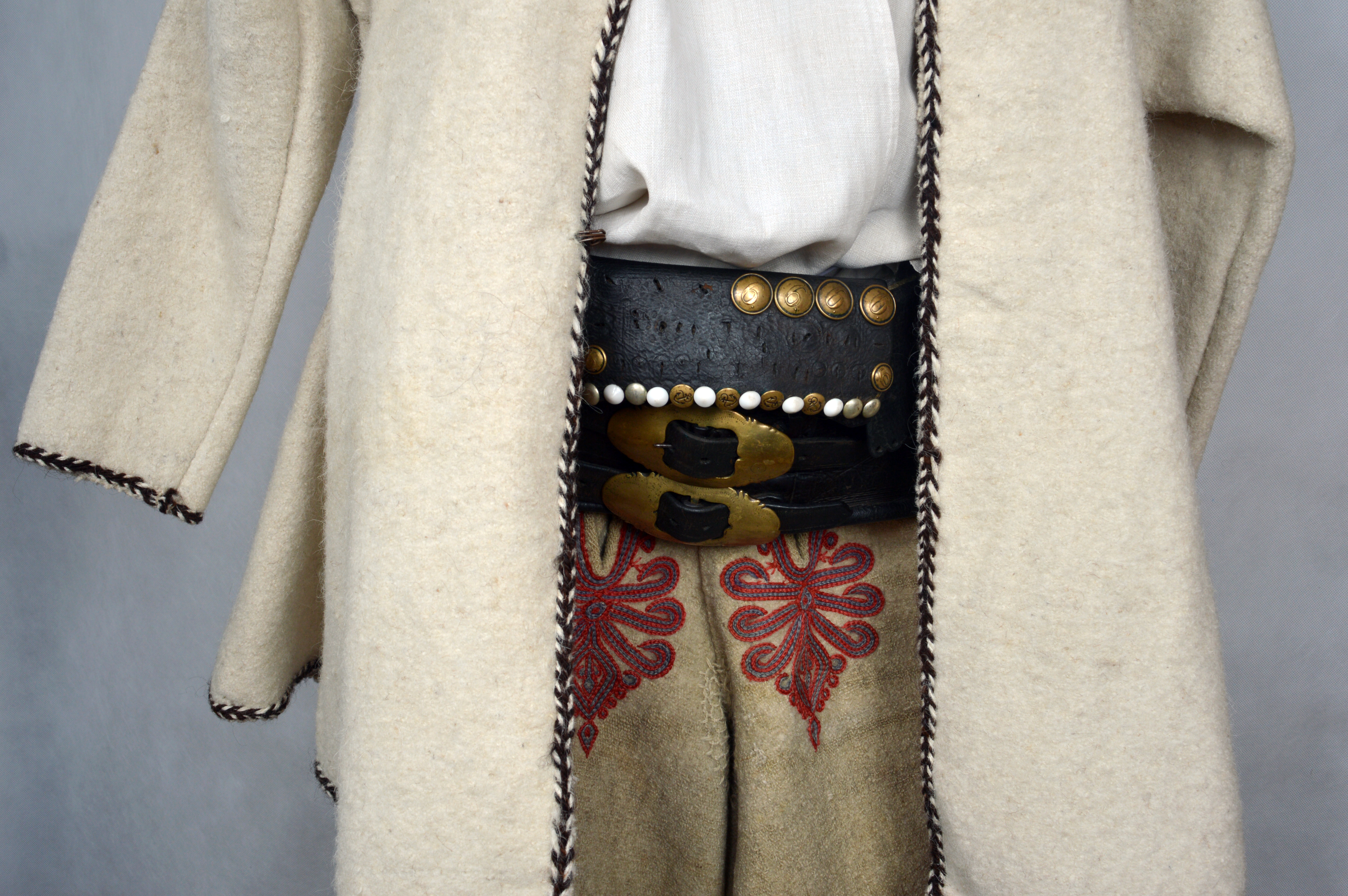
Details of the man's costume from Podhale region: traditional belt and 'parzenica' embroidery on trousers.
Traditional Women`s Clothing from Podhale region

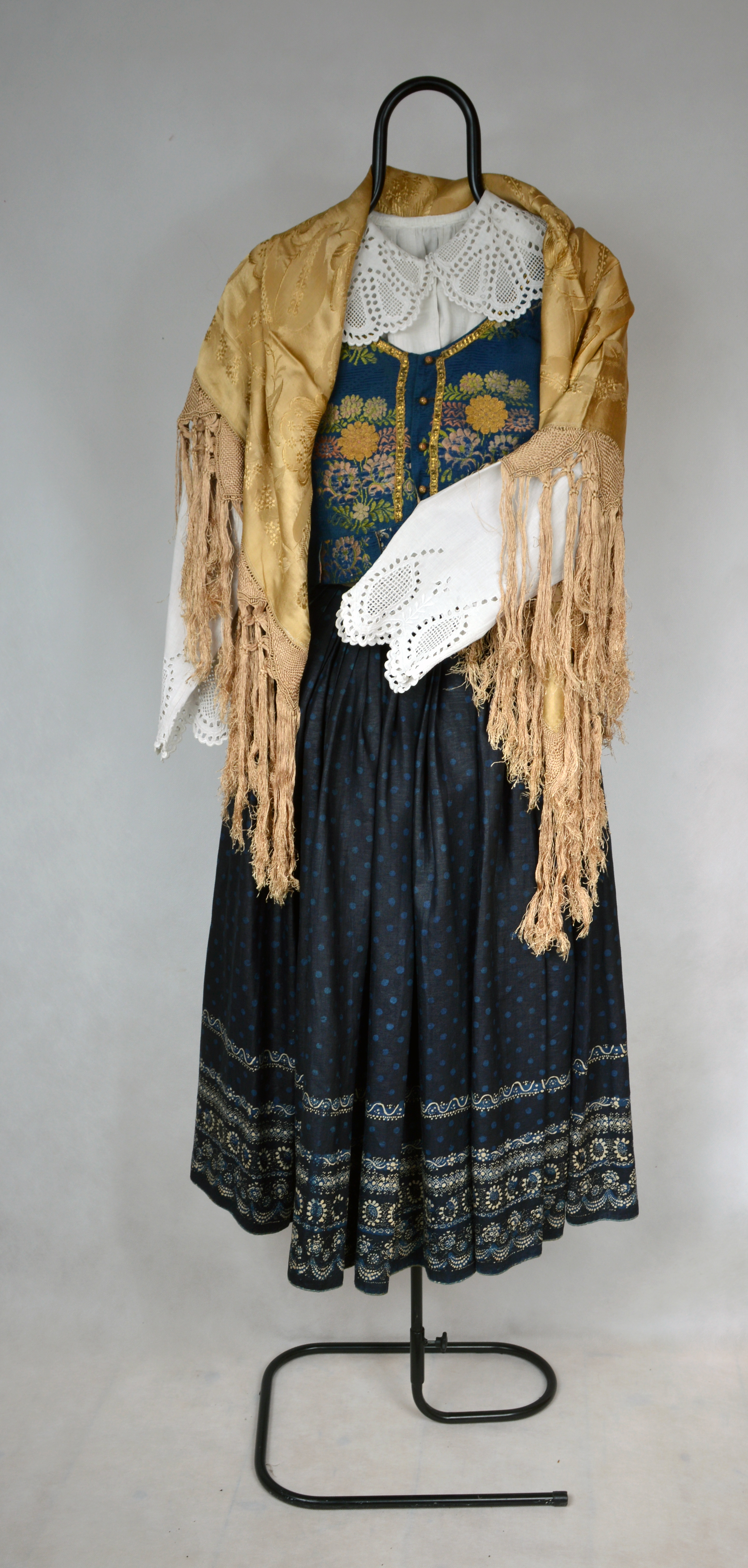
Traditional woman's attire from Podhale region (from the collection of the Tatra Museum in Zakopane) - front view.

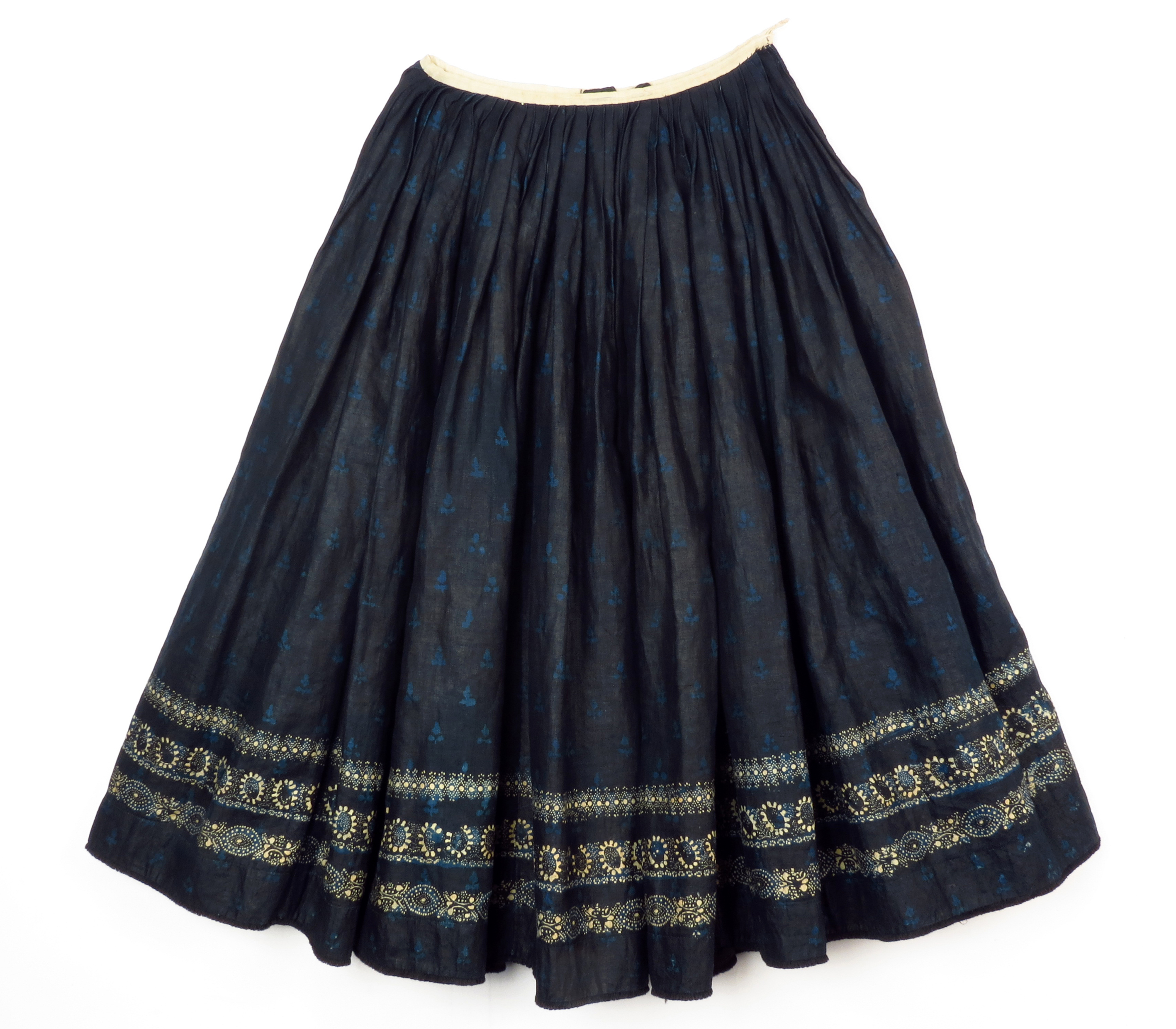
Traditional skirt from Podhale region (from the collection of Tatra Museum in Zakopane)

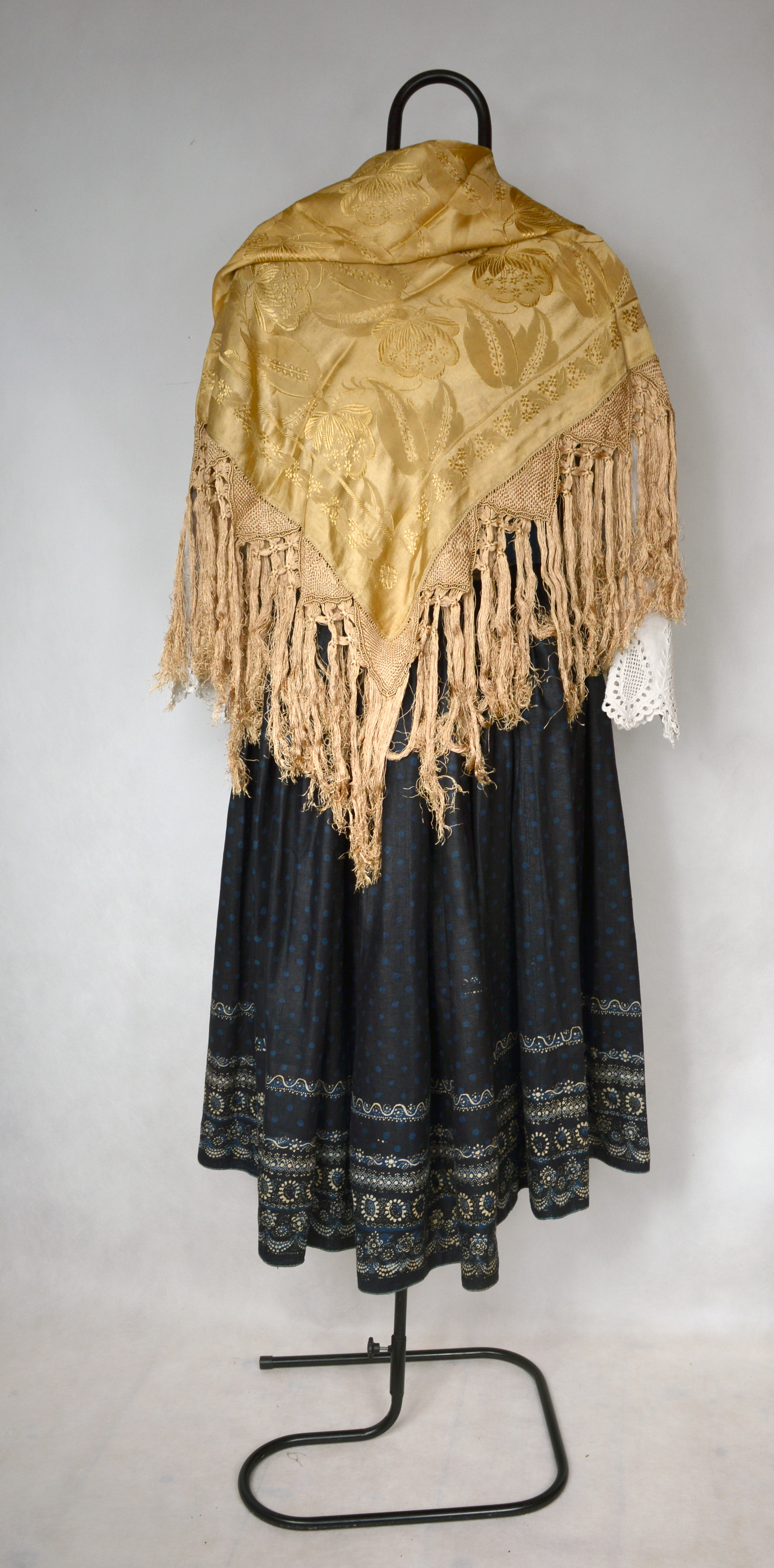
Traditional woman's attire from Podhale region (from the Tatra Museum's collection) - back view.

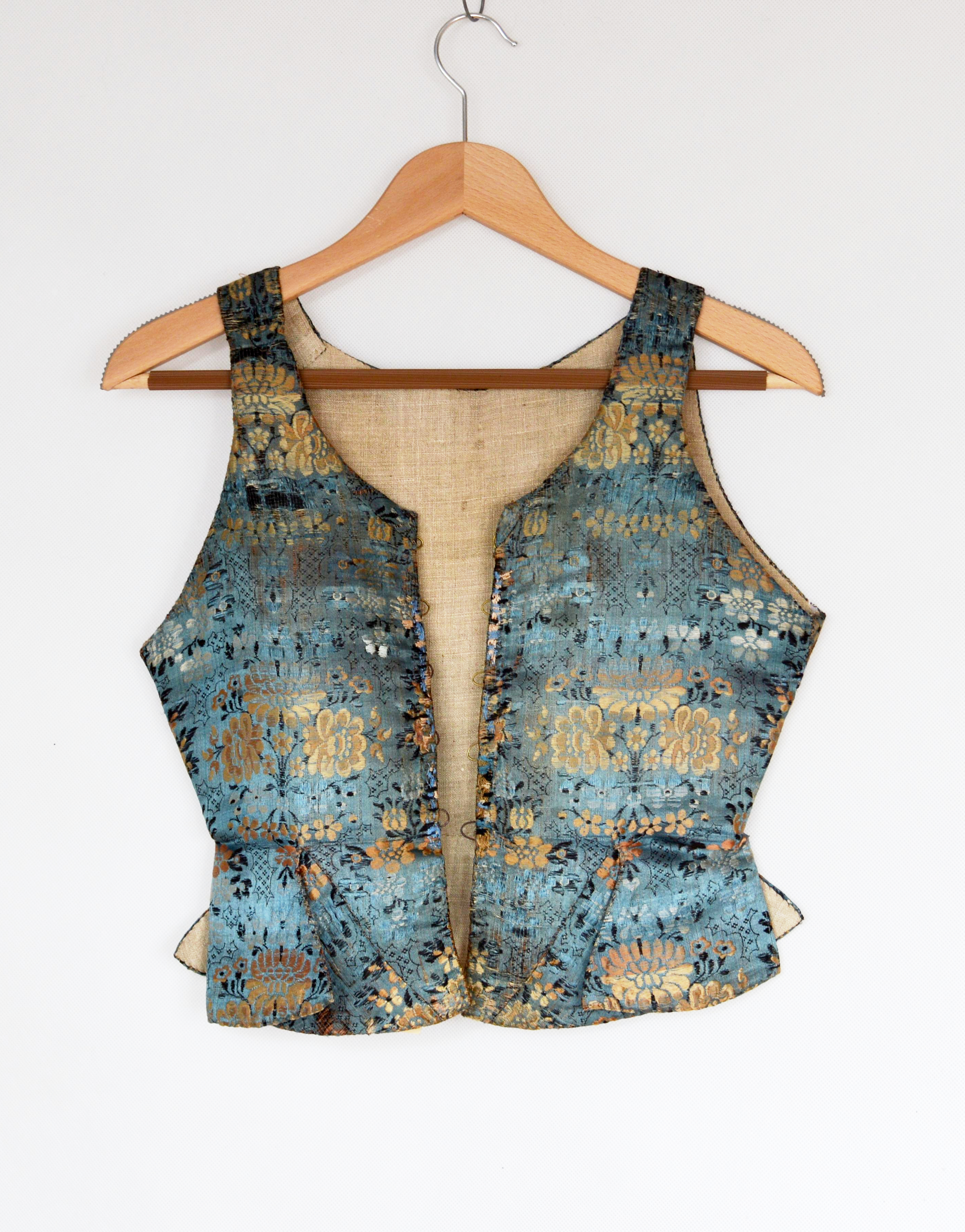
Woman's traditional corset - Podhale region (from the Tatra Museum's collection).
