= Rzepiska, Lesser Poland Voivodeship =

Rzepiska
- Village
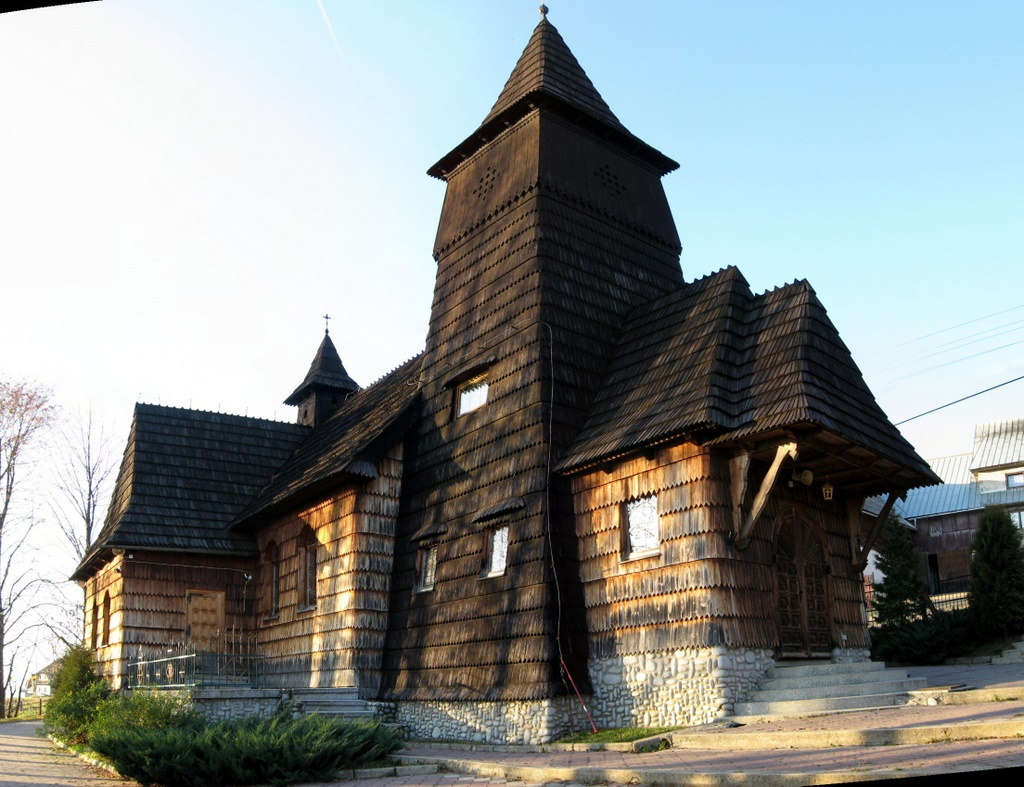
- Church of Our Lady of Perpetual Help

- Location within Poland
- Coordinates: 49°22′N 20°9′E
- Country: Poland
- Voivodeship: Lesser Poland
- County: Tatra
- Gmina: Bukowina Tatrzańska

Rzepiska [ʐɛˈpiska] (Slovak: Repisko, Hungarian: Répásfalu) is a village in the administrative district of Gmina Bukowina Tatrzańska, within Tatra County, Lesser Poland Voivodeship, in southern Poland, close to the border with Slovakia.

It is one of the 14 villages in the Polish part of the historical region of Spiš (Polish: Spisz).
