= Groń, Wadowice County =

Groń
- Village
- Location within Poland
- Coordinates: 49°48′27″N 19°18′02″E
- Country: Poland
- Voivodeship: Lesser Poland
- County: Wadowice
- Gmina: Andrychów

Groń [ɡrɔɲ] is a village in the administrative district of Gmina Andrychów, within Wadowice County, Lesser Poland Voivodeship, in southern Poland.

== See also ==
- Groń, Tatra County
