= Groń, Tatra County =

Groń
- Village
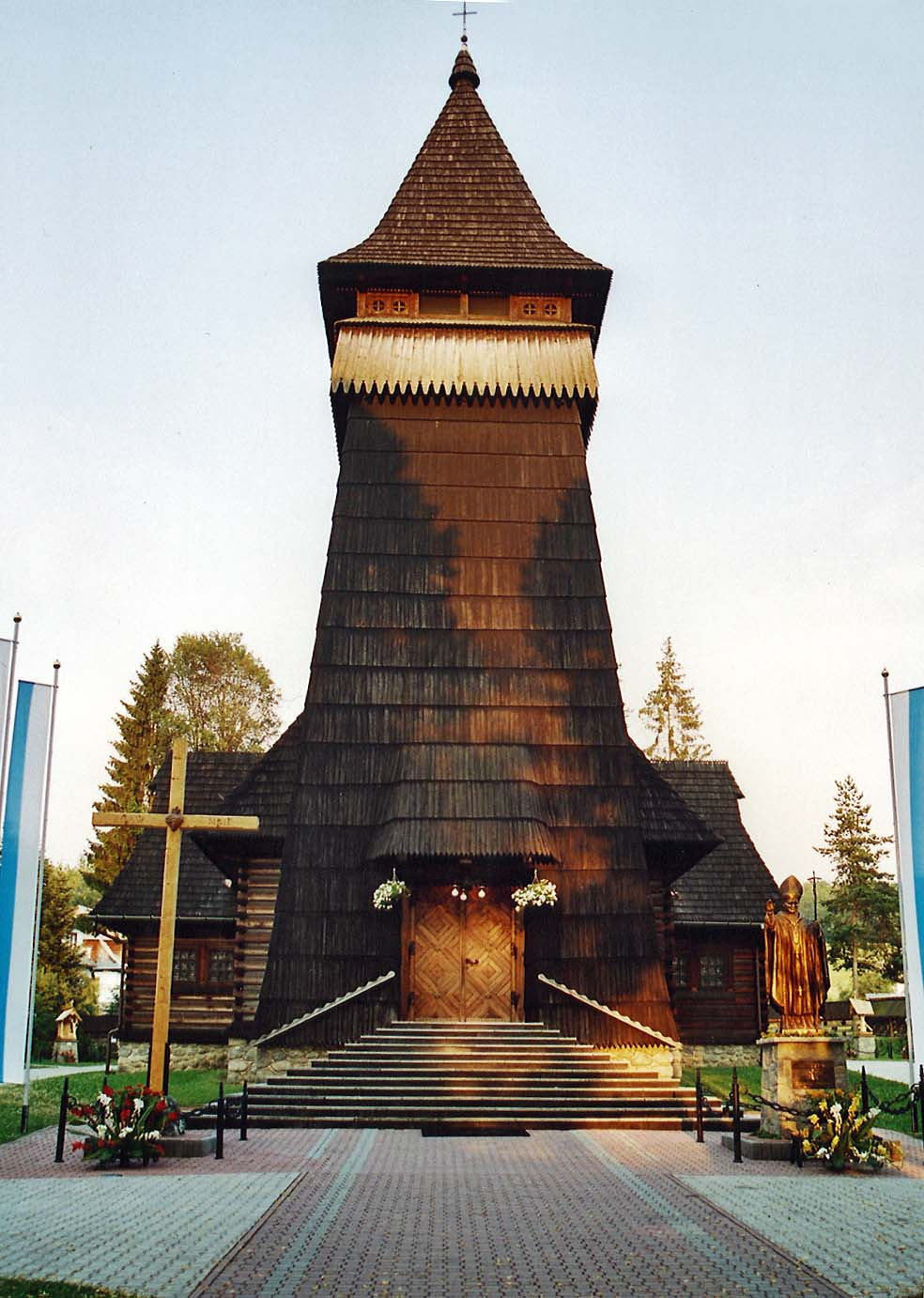
- Saint Jacek Odrowąż Church

- Location within Poland
- Coordinates: 49°23′29″N 20°04′05″E
- Country: Poland
- Voivodeship: Lesser Poland
- County: Tatra
- Gmina: Bukowina Tatrzańska
- Population: 1,700

Groń [ɡrɔɲ] is a village in the administrative district of Gmina Bukowina Tatrzańska, within Tatra County, Lesser Poland Voivodeship, in southern Poland, close to the border with Slovakia.

== See also ==
- Groń, Wadowice County
