= Janosik =

Janosik can refer to:

- Janosik (1921 film), a Slovak film
- Janosik (film 1974), a Polish adventures film
- Janosik (TV series), a Polish TV series
- Janosik. Prawdziwa historia, a Polish historical film
- Jánošík (disambiguation)
