= Leśnica, Tatra County =

Leśnica
- Village
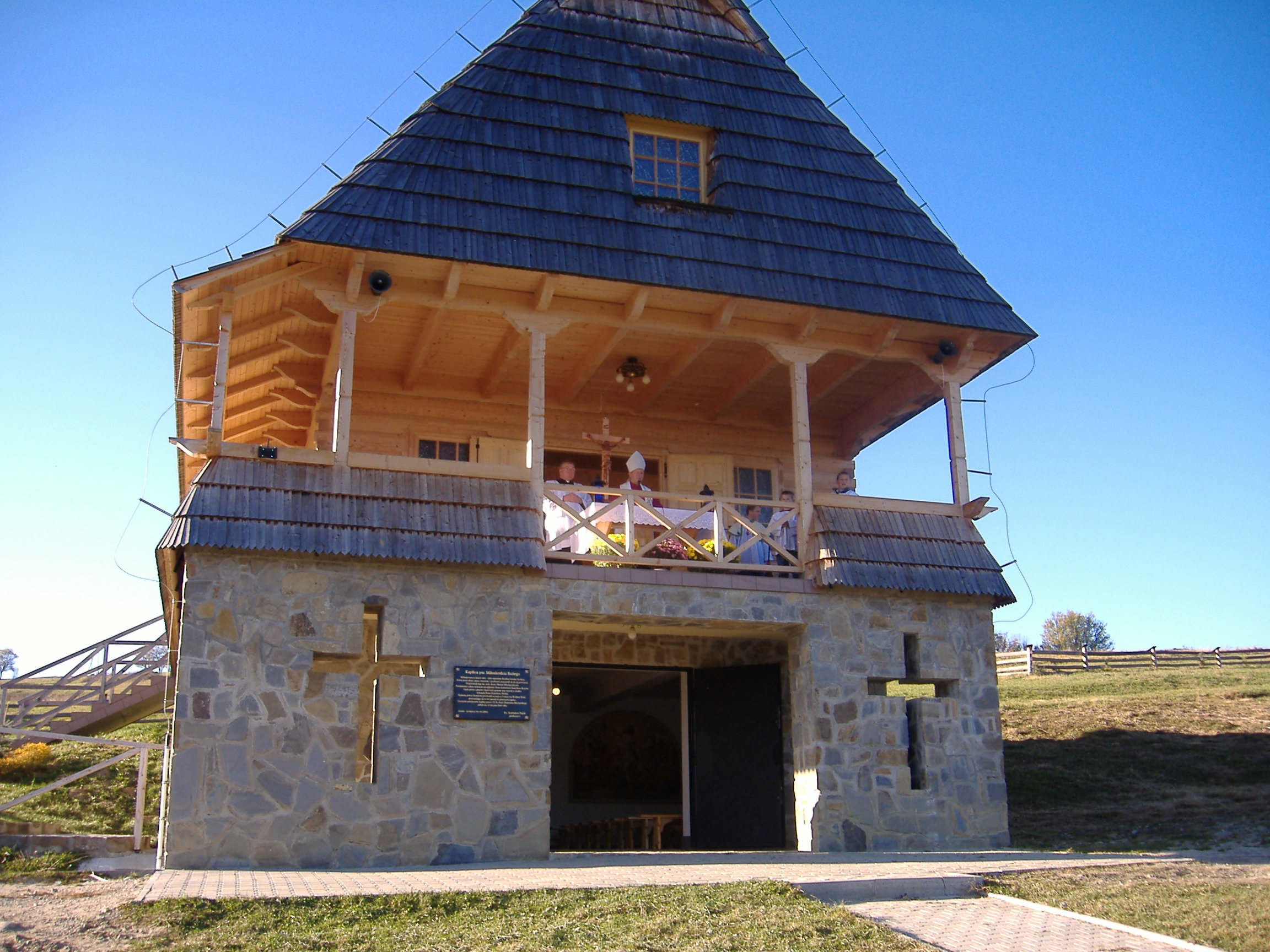
- Cemetery chapel

- Location within Poland
- Coordinates: 49°23′29″N 20°03′18″E
- Country: Poland
- Voivodeship: Lesser Poland
- County: Tatra
- Gmina: Bukowina Tatrzańska
- Population: 1,200
- Time zone: UTC+1 (CET)
  - Summer (DST): UTC+2 (CEST)
- Vehicle registration: KTT

Leśnica [lɛɕˈnit͡sa] is a village in the administrative district of Gmina Bukowina Tatrzańska, within Tatra County, Lesser Poland Voivodeship, in southern Poland, close to the border with Slovakia.

The village has a few small stores along with a church and elementary school. It is very rural, with most of the residents owning animals and having small farms. The nearest city is Nowy Targ, where most of the residents do their shopping and where students go to for high school.

== Demographics ==
Historical population
Year	Pop.	±%
1771	507	—
1799	735	+45.0%
1824	739	+0.5%
1869	770	+4.2%
1880	884	+14.8%
2012	1,718	+94.3%
