= Lešnica, Gostivar =

Lešnica Лешница Leshnicë
- Village
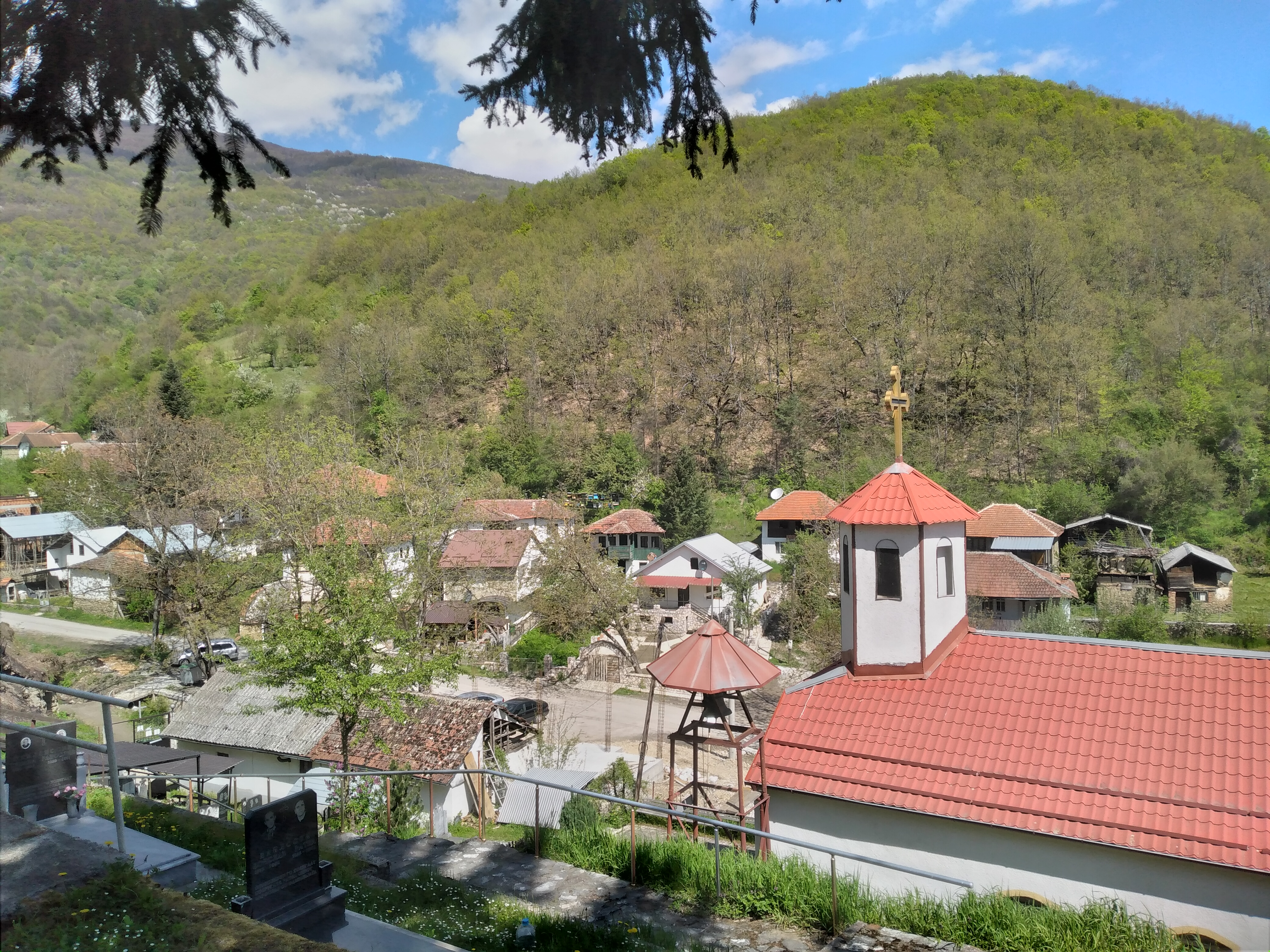

- Location within North Macedonia
- Coordinates: 41°47′54″N 20°51′33″E
- Country: North Macedonia
- Region: Polog
- Municipality: Gostivar

Population (2021)
  - Total: 57
- Time zone: UTC+1 (CET)
  - Summer (DST): UTC+2 (CEST)
- Car plates: GV
- Website: .

Lešnica (Macedonian: Лешница, Albanian: Leshnicë) is a village in the municipality of Gostivar, North Macedonia.

== Demographics ==
Lešnica is attested in the 1467/68 Ottoman tax registry (defter) for the Nahiyah of Kalkandelen. The village had a total of 18 Christian households and 1 bachelor.

As of the 2021 census, Lešnica had 128 residents with the following ethnic composition:

- Macedonians 99
- Albanians 31
- Persons for whom data are taken from administrative sources 9
