= Brzegi, Tatra County =

Brzegi
- Village
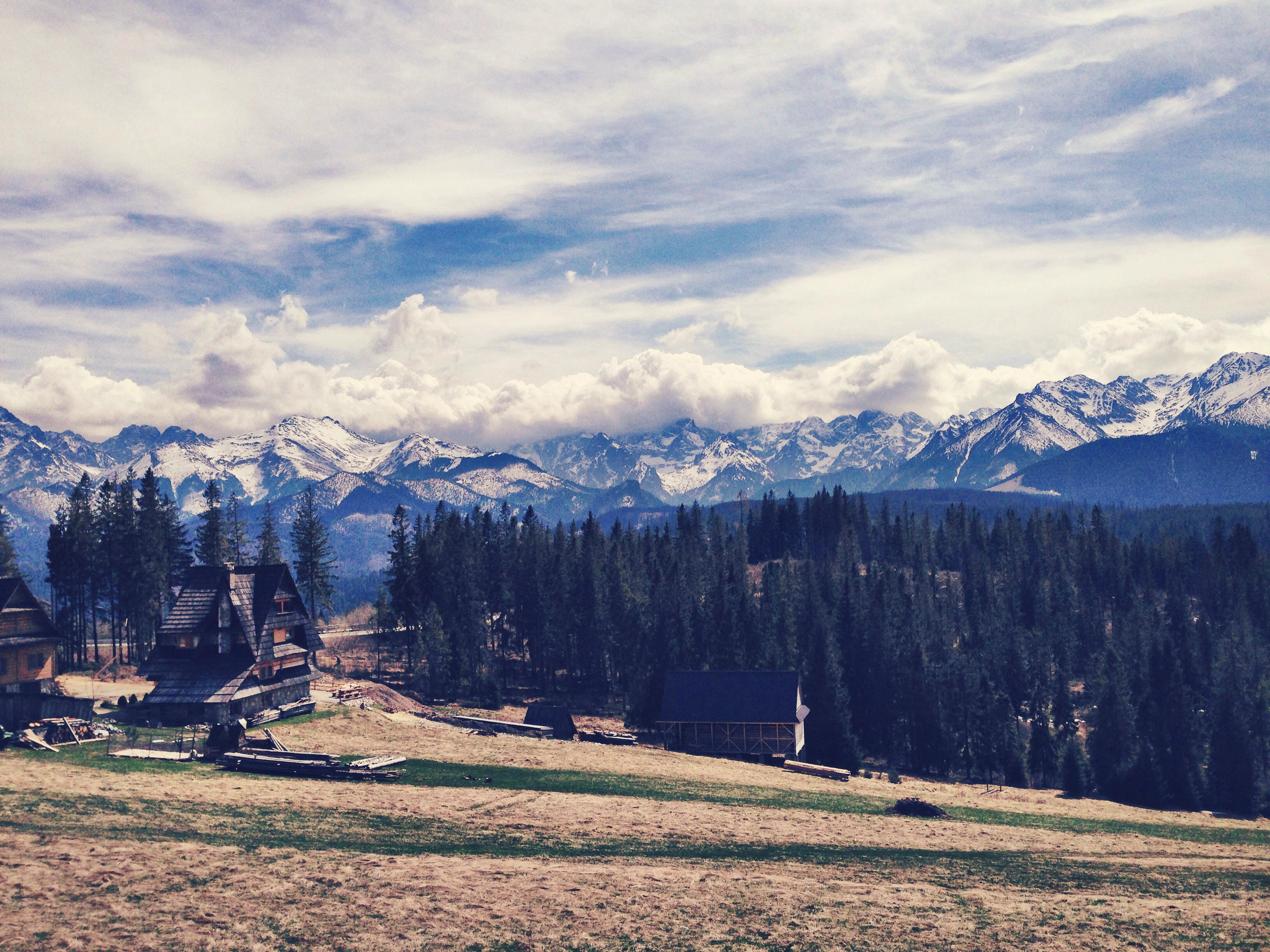
- Głodówka Glade
- Interactive map of Brzegi
- Location within Poland
- Coordinates: 49°20′N 20°07′E
- Country: Poland
- Voivodeship: Lesser Poland
- County: Tatra
- Gmina: Bukowina Tatrzańska
- Highest elevation: 2,499 m (8,199 ft)
- Lowest elevation: 770 m (2,530 ft)
- Time zone: UTC+1 (CET)
  - Summer (DST): UTC+2 (CEST)
- Vehicle registration: KTT
- Website: www.brzegi.com.pl

Brzegi [ˈbʐɛɡi] is a village in the administrative district of Gmina Bukowina Tatrzańska, within Tatra County, Lesser Poland Voivodeship, in southern Poland, close to the border with Slovakia.
