= Gliczarów Dolny =

- Village
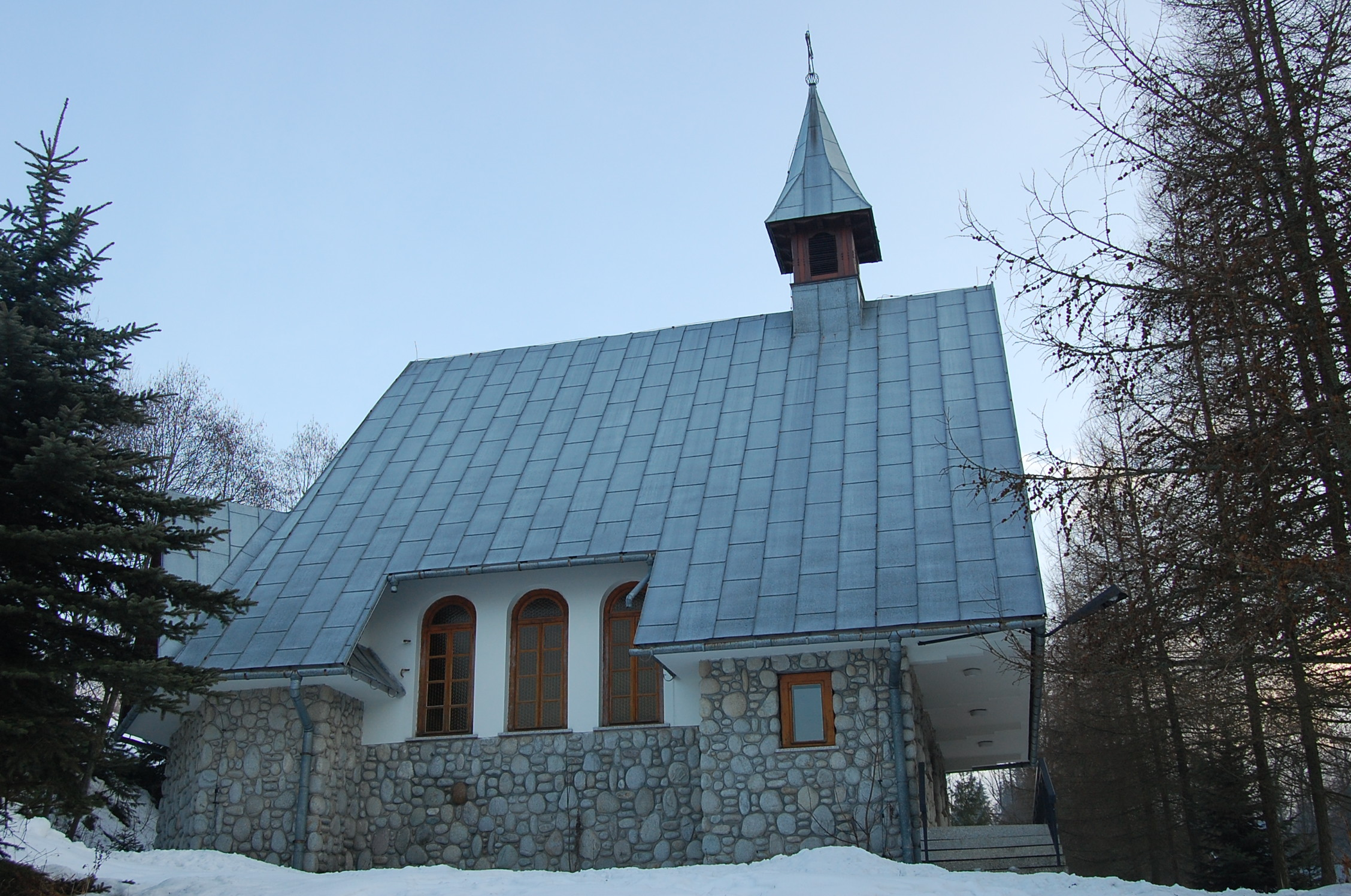
- Chapel in the village

- Location within Poland
- Coordinates: 49°22′N 20°2′E
- Country: Poland
- Voivodeship: Lesser Poland
- County: Tatra
- Gmina: Biały Dunajec
- Population: 480

Gliczarów Dolny [ɡliˈt͡ʂaruf ˈdɔlnɨ] is a village in the administrative district of Gmina Biały Dunajec, within Tatra County, Lesser Poland Voivodeship, in southern Poland.

== Famous persons born ==
- Wojciech Kułach
