= Leshnitsa =

Leshnitsa may refers to the following places in Bulgaria:

- Leshnitsa, Blagoevgrad Province, a settlement in Blagoevgrad Province
- Leshnitsa, Lovech Province, a settlement in Lovech Province

== See also ==
- Lešnica (disambiguation)
