= Gmina Bukowina Tatrzańska =

Gmina Bukowina Tatrzańska Bukowina Tatrzańska Commune
- Gmina
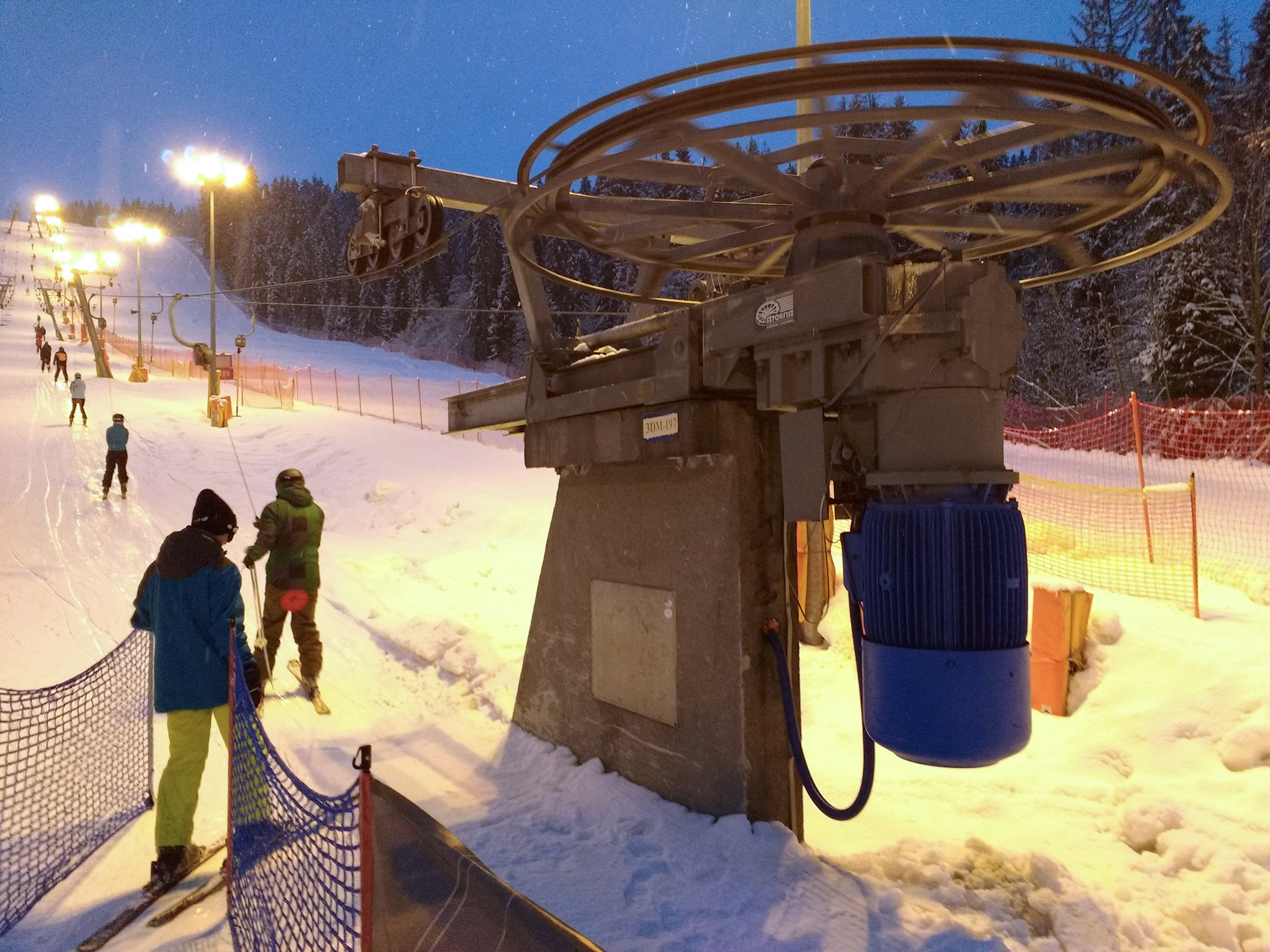
- Ski resort of Białka Tatrzańska

- Coat of arms
- Interactive map of Gmina Bukowina Tatrzańska
- Coordinates (Bukowina Tatrzańska): 49°21′N 20°7′E
- Country: Poland
- Voivodeship: Lesser Poland
- County: Tatra
- Seat: Bukowina Tatrzańska

Area
  - Total: 131.84 km^{2} (50.90 sq mi)

Population (2006)
  - Total: 12,386
  - Density: 93.947/km^{2} (243.32/sq mi)
- Website: http://www.gmina.bukowinatatrzanska.pl/

Gmina Bukowina Tatrzańska (Slovak: Tatranská Bukovina) is a rural gmina (administrative district) in Tatra County, Lesser Poland Voivodeship, in southern Poland, on the Slovak border. Its seat is the village of Bukowina Tatrzańska, which lies approximately 14 kilometres (9 mi) north-east of Zakopane and 80 km (50 mi) south of the regional capital Kraków.

The gmina covers an area of 131.84 square kilometres (50.9 sq mi), and as of 2006 its total population is 12,386.

== Villages ==
Gmina Bukowina Tatrzańska contains the villages and settlements of Białka Tatrzańska, Brzegi, Bukowina Tatrzańska, Czarna Góra, Groń, Jurgów, Leśnica and Rzepiska.

== Neighbouring gminas ==
Gmina Bukowina Tatrzańska is bordered by the town of Zakopane and by the gminas of Biały Dunajec, Łapsze Niżne, Nowy Targ, Poronin and Szaflary. It also borders Slovakia.
