= Lješnica =

Lješnica may refer to:

- Lješnica (Derventa) near Derventa, Bosnia and Herzegovina
- Lješnica (Tuzla) near Tuzla, Bosnia and Herzegovina
- Lješnica, Bijelo Polje, Montenegro
- Lješnica, Petnjica, Montenegro
- Lješnica (Serbia) near in Kučevo, Serbia
