= Bukowina Tatrzańska =

- Village
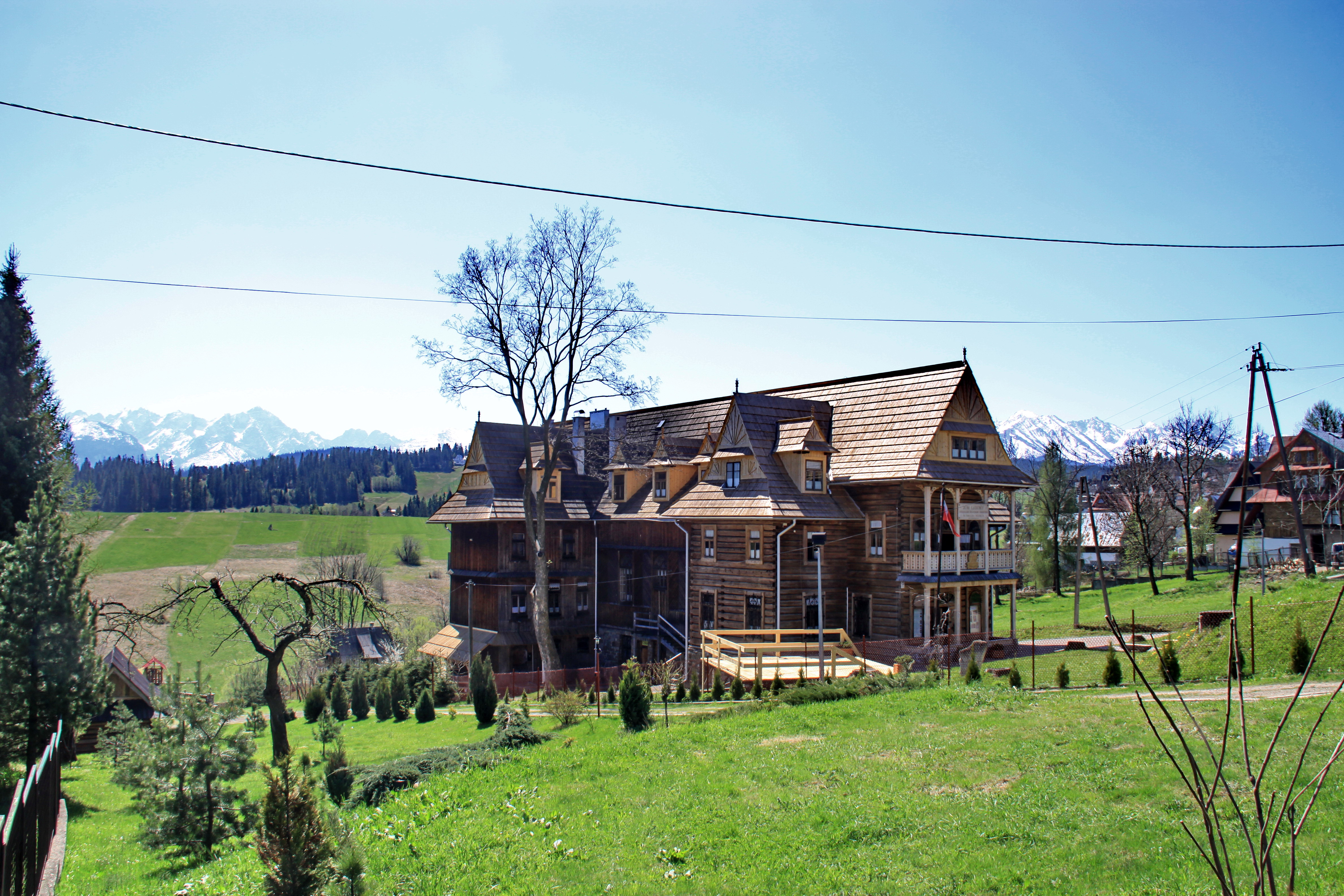
- Cultural centre in Bukowina Tatrzańska

- Coat of arms
- Interactive map of Bukowina Tatrzańska
- Location within Poland
- Coordinates: 49°21′N 20°7′E
- Country: Poland
- Voivodeship: Lesser Poland
- County: Tatra
- Gmina: Bukowina Tatrzańska
- Highest elevation: 1,000 m (3,300 ft)
- Lowest elevation: 860 m (2,820 ft)
- Population: 2,976
- Website: bukowinatatrzanska.pl

Bukowina Tatrzańska [bukɔˈvina taˈtʂaɲska], (Slovak: Tatranská Bukovina) is a village in Tatra County, Lesser Poland Voivodeship, in southern Poland, close to the border with Slovakia. It is the seat of the gmina (administrative district) called Gmina Bukowina Tatrzańska.

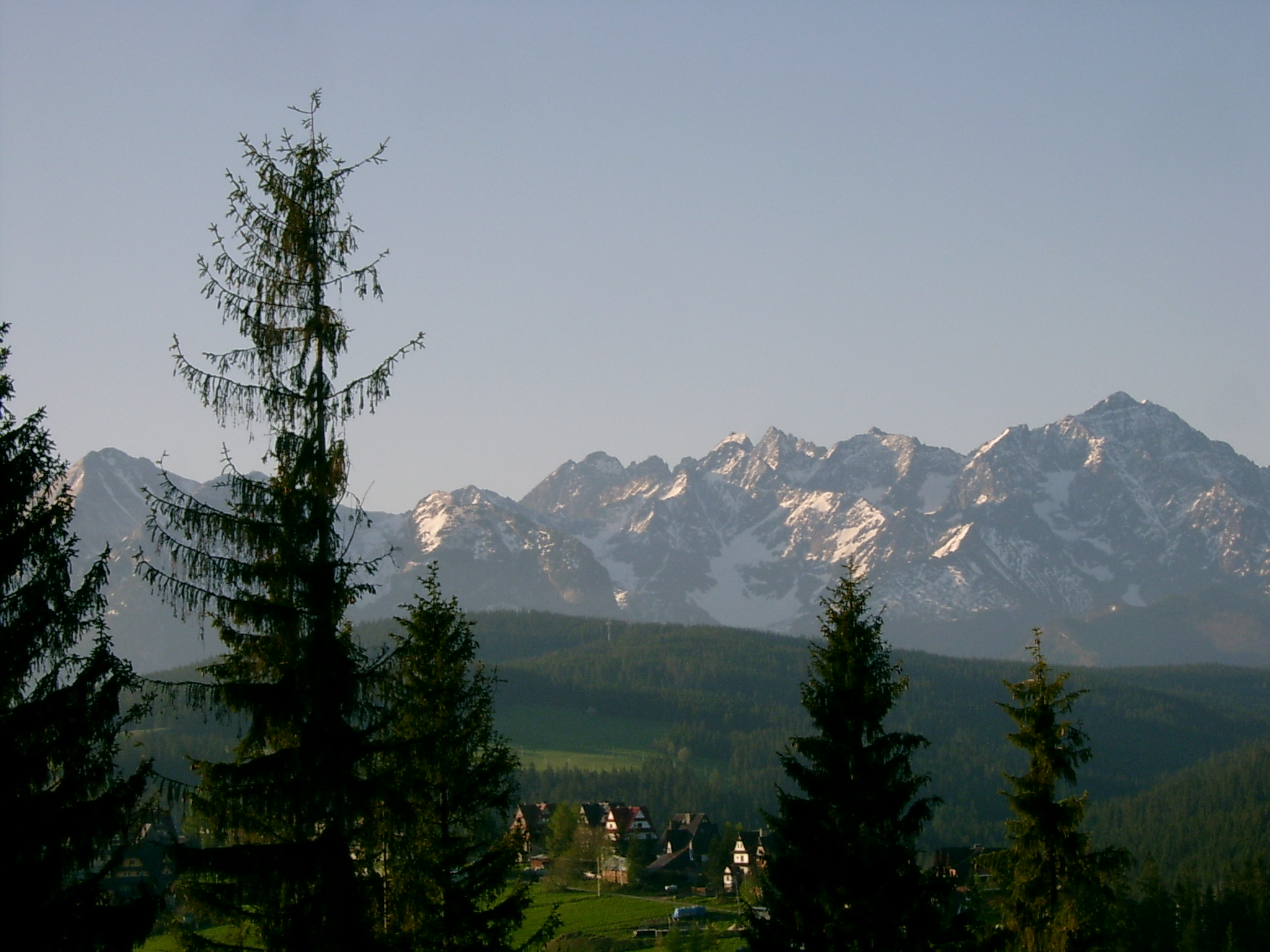
Tatra Mountains seen from Bukowina Tatrzańska

Bukowina Tatrzańska is a popular destination for the Tour de Pologne, having served as the finishing point for stages several times, most recently in the 2014 edition of the race.

In the village there are several historic wooden guesthouses from the Interbellum Period built in the Zakopane Style architecture including the Cultural Centre which is ranked among the biggest wooden buildings in Poland. The village also hosts the annual Polish folklore festival Sabałowe Bajania.
