= Białka Tatrzańska =

- Village
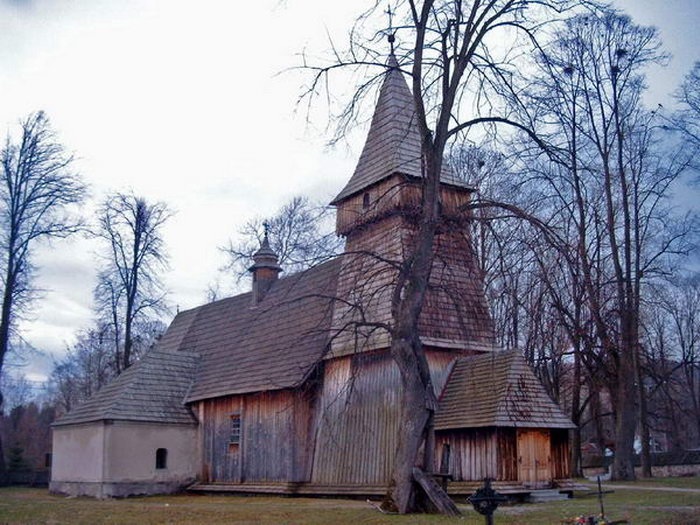
- Wooden church

- Location within Poland
- Coordinates: 49°23′41″N 20°6′18″E
- Country: Poland
- County: Tatra
- Gmina: Bukowina Tatrzańska
- Highest elevation: 725 m (2,379 ft)
- Lowest elevation: 650 m (2,130 ft)
- Population: 2,200
- Website: http://www.bialka-tatrzanska.pl

Bialka Tatrzanska [ˈbjau̯ka taˈtʂaɲska] is a village in the administrative district of Gmina Bukowina Tatrzańska, within Tatra County, Lesser Poland Voivodeship, in southern Poland, close to the border with Slovakia.

A skiing center in the village attracts many tourists and has improved the economy of the area. Many residents have created chalets and bed and breakfast facilities to accommodate skiers.

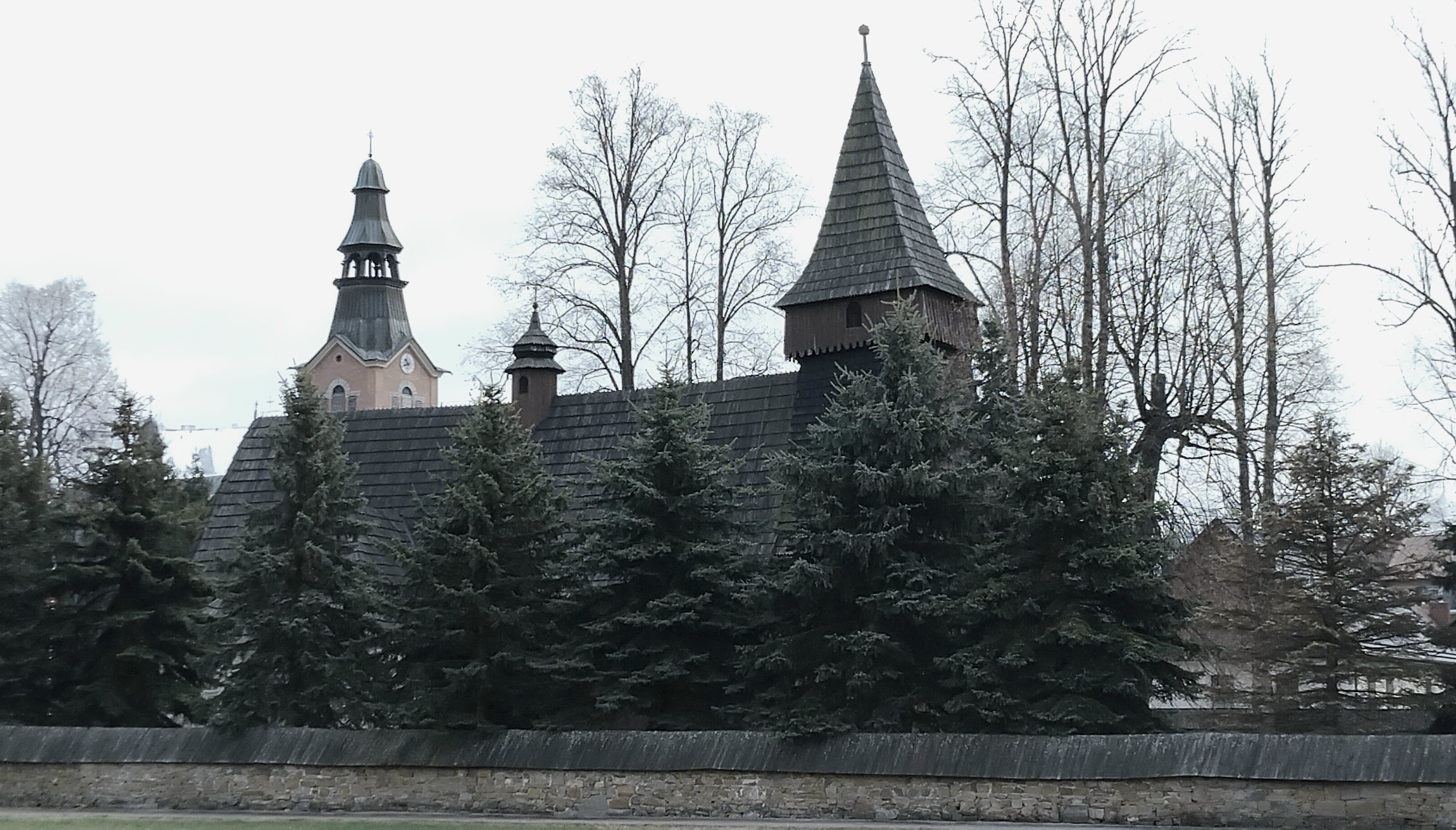
Centro. Noviembre 2024
