= Želino Municipality =

Municipality of North Macedonia

Coordinates: 41.99°N 21.07°E

Municipality of Želino Општина Желино Komuna e Zhelinës
- Rural municipality
- Flag Coat of arms

- Country: North Macedonia
- Region: Polog
- Municipal seat: Želino

Government
  - Mayor: Blerim Sejdiu (VLEN)

Area
  - Total: 201.04 km^{2} (77.62 sq mi)
- Elevation: 755 m (2,477 ft)

Population (2021)
  - Total: 18,988
  - Density: 94.449/km^{2} (244.62/sq mi)
- Time zone: UTC+1 (CET)
- Postal code: 1226
- Area code: 044
- Vehicle registration: TE
- Website: Official Website

Želino (Macedonian: Желино, Albanian: Zhelinë) is a municipality in the northwestern part of North Macedonia. Želino is also the name of the village where the municipal seat is found. This municipality is part of the Polog Statistical Region.

== Geography ==
The municipality borders Jegunovce Municipality to the north, the City of Skopje to the east, Tetovo Municipality to the northwest, Brvenica Municipality to the west, Sopište Municipality to the southeast, and Makedonski Brod Municipality to the south.

The municipality includes the Kozjak Hydro Power Plant which created the associated artificial lake, the largest such lake in the country.

== Demographics ==
This municipality has 18,988 inhabitants, according to the 2021 North Macedonia census. Ethnic groups in the municipality:

	2002		2021	
	Number	%	Number	%
TOTAL	24,390	100	18,988	100
Albanians	24,195	99.2	18,191	95.8
Macedonians	71	0.29	9	0.04
Bosniaks	5	0.02	1	0.01
Turks	2	0.01		
Serbs	1	0.004		
Other / Undeclared / Unknown	116	0.476	3	0.02
Persons for whom data are taken from administrative sources			784	4.13

Demographics of Želino Municipality
Census year	Population
1994	21,760
2002	24,390
2021	18,988
