= Polish Highlanders Alliance of North America =

Góral organization in the United States

Polish Highlanders Alliance of America
- Związek Podhalan w Północnej Ameryce

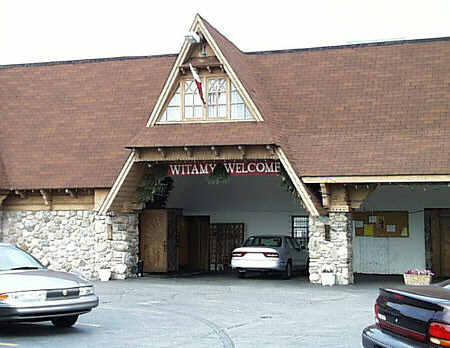
- The seat of the ZPPA along Archer Avenue just northeast of its intersection with Pulaski (picture taken before remodeling project has begun)
- Abbreviation: ZPPA
- Established: 1929; 97 years ago
- Type: Nonprofit
- Headquarters: Highlander Home
- Location: Chicago, United States
- General Secretary: Krzysztof Zółtek
- President: Jan Król
- Vice-President: Marzena Kostelic
- Vice-President of economic affairs: Wiesław Siuta
- Vice-President of cultural affairs: Karolina Strzelec-Stafiera
- Publication: Podhalanin
- Website: zppa.org

The Polish Highlanders Alliance of America (Polish: Związek Podhalan w Północnej Ameryce (ZPPA)) was founded in 1929 in Chicago as an organization that unites all other Góral organizations in the United States. Most of Chicago's Góral community is concentrated on Chicago's Southwest Side along Archer Avenue where the headquarters, also known as the Highlander Home (Polish: Dom Podhalan) is located.

The Highlander House is styled as a Carpathian chalet in the traditional Zakopane Style of Architecture. Located at 4808 S. Archer Avenue in Chicago, the structure underwent renovation under the eye of famed artist Jerzy Kenar in 2005. In 2012 the Highlander House was upgraded with state of the art audio and video equipment.

The ZPPA is a nonprofit organization run by an executive board. The members of the current (voted September 2024) board are:

Jan Krol - president
Marzena Kostelic Predki - vice president
Wieslaw Siuta- vice president of economic affairs
Karolina Strzelec Stafiera - vice president of cultural affairs
Malgorzata Stopka - vice president for the East Coast
Krzysztof Zoltek - general secretary
Mateusz Staszel - financial secretary
Beata Firek - treasurer
Jan Greczek - marshall
Jozef Fryzlewicz- Secretary of Records (minutes)

Chicago's Góral community publishes its own quarterly newspaper Podhalanin, in addition to transmitting radio programs such as Gawędy, Poezja i muzyka góralska, or Na góralską nutę, broadcasting from WPNA 1490 AM. The Polish language Chicago area daily Dziennik Związkowy publishes a section titled Kronika podhalańska (transl. The Highlander Chronicle).

== Member organizations (circles) within the Polish Highlander Alliance of North America ==
1. Jan Sabała's memorial circle
2. Władysław Orkan's memorial circle
3. Morskie Oko
4. Morskie Oko - Detroit, Michigan
5. Władysław Zamoyski's memorial circle
6. Kazimierz Przerwa-Tetmajer's memorial circle in Passaic, New Jersey
7. Inactive
8. General Galica's memorial circle
9. Armstrong Creek, Wisconsin
10. J. Janosik’s memorial circle
11. Tatra Mountains Górals in Passaic, New Jersey
12. Polish Highlanders in New York
13. Dr. Stefan Jarosz memorial circle
14. Tatry, Uniontown, Pennsylvania
15. Inactive
16. Association of Polish Highlanders from Zakopane in Utica, New York
17. Makow Podhalanski circle
18. Giewont circle in Mount Pleasant, Pennsylvania
19. Duch Knapczyk's memorial circle
20. Kazimierz Przerwa-Tetmajer’s memorial circle
21. Czarny Dunajec
22. Maniowy
23. Odrowąż Podhalański
24. Szaflary
25. Harklowa
26. Raba Wyżna
27. Witów
28. Gronków
29. Ciche
30. Wierchy
31. Spytkowice
32. Dzianisz
33. Zakopane
34. Maruszyna
35. Skawa
36. Leśnica Groń
37. Ludźmierz
38. Chabówka
39. Biały Dunajec
40. Nowy Targ
41. Wróblówka
42. Białka Tatrzańska
43. Chochołów
44. Śleboda
45. Poronin
46. Stare Bystre
47. Ski Club “Tatry”
48. Babia Góra
49. Kluszkowce
50. Pieniny
51. Ostrowsko
52. Czerwienne
53. Klikuszowa parish
54. Kościelisko
55. Ratułów
56. “Podhale” Soccer Club
57. Bukowina Tatrzańska
58. Ząb
59. Morawczyna
60. Małe Ciche
61. Łopuszna
62. Hubertus - Hunting circle
63. Waksmund under the patronage of St. Hedwig
64. Czarna Góra
65. Ciche Dolne, Miętusowo parish
66. Dębno
67. Pieniążkowice
68. Gliczarów Górny "Wierchowiany"
69. Skrzypne
70. Polish Highlanders in Arizona
71. Nowe Bystre
72. Ochotnica
73. Zaskale
74. Tylmanowa
75. Dział
76. Kruszów
77. Bukowina Podszkle
78. Zagórzanie of Mszana Dolna
79. Florida under the patronage of Our Lady of Ludźmierz
80. Polish Highlanders in Washington State
81. Bustryk
82. Piekielnik
83. Podczerwone
84. Giewont in Lemont
85. Gronik
86. TOPR
87. Zespol Goralski Szkolka Piesni i Tanca, Polish Highlander Youth Folkloric Group representing Polish Highlander Alliance in Chicago
88. Zespol Goralski Siumni "SIUMNI," Polish Highlander Folkloric Group representing Polish Highlander Alliance in Chicago (www.siumni.org and Facebook "Siumni")

and also the Brighton Park circle, Podhalan Women's Club, The Ski Club, Podhale Soccer Club.
