= St. Mary of Częstochowa (Cicero, Illinois) =

Coordinates: 41.8382°N 87.74582°W

St. Mary of Częstochowa Church
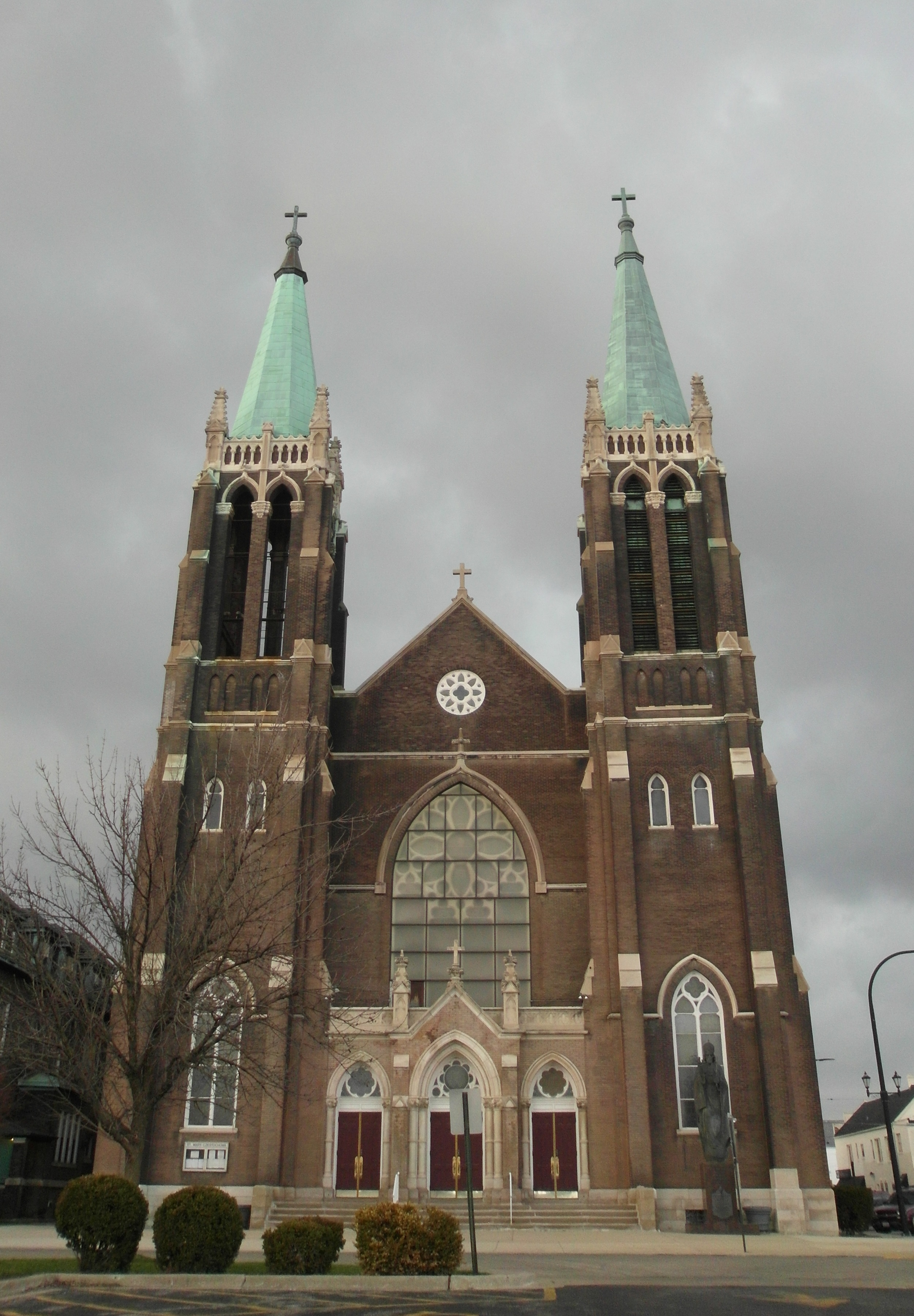

- Location within Illinois
- Location: 3010 South 48th Court; Cicero, Illinois
- Country: United States
- Denomination: Roman Catholic
- Website: St. Mary of Czestochowa Parish

History
- Founded: 1895
- Founder: Polish immigrants
- Dedication: St. Mary of Częstochowa
- Dedicated: March 10, 1918

Architecture
- Functional status: Active
- Heritage designation: For Polish immigrants
- Architect: Worthmann and Steinbach
- Architectural type: Church
- Style: Polish Cathedral style
- Groundbreaking: October 29, 1917
- Completed: 1918

Specifications
- Materials: Brick

St. Mary of Częstochowa in Cicero (Polish: Kościół Matki Boskiej Częstochowskiej) is an historic church of the Archdiocese of Chicago located in Cicero, Illinois.

It is a prime example of the Polish Cathedral style of churches in both its opulence and grand scale. A sculpture of Christ the King by famed sculptor Professor Czesław Dźwigaj, who also cast the monumental bronze doors at St. Hyacinth's Basilica in Chicago stands in front of the church. The church is also well known as the site where Al Capone's sister Mafalda married in 1930.

The parish of St. Mary of Częstochowa serves a diverse population. A number of parishioners, still actively involved, lay claim to having parents and grandparents who pioneered the parish. A young Polish immigrant population, although not living in the area, have strong ties to the Black Madonna and call St. Mary of Częstochowa their spiritual home. Just as great numbers of Poles and Germans settled in the Hawthorne neighborhood of Cicero over a hundred years ago, so today large numbers of people from Mexico have settled here, and the Hispanic presence is very much part of the parish. St. Mary of Częstochowa offers mass in Polish, Spanish and English and is currently home to 1,450 families.

== History ==
The parish of St. Mary of Częstochowa was founded as a Polish parish in 1895, but the Polish community in Hawthorne in Cicero, Illinois dates from the 1880s when the area was still prairie. The Polish settlement in Hawthorne centered around the Dolese & Shepherd lime and stone quarry at 31st and Cicero Avenue. Hawthorne's Polish Catholics walked over five miles to St. Adalbert's at 16th and Allport Streets in Chicago in order to attend Masses in their native tongue. With the formation of St. Casimir Church at 22nd and Whipple Streets in 1890, their trip shortened to three and a half miles, yet they longed for a parish of their own. The only Catholic parish in Cicero was then St. Dionysius, a predominantly German parish at 4852 West 29th Street, established as a mission of Holy Trinity Church in Chicago in 1889.

On March 27, 1892, Polish Catholics of Hawthorne met to discuss plans for a parish. By May 1893, the group purchased six lots at 30th Street and Linden (now 49th) Avenue at a cost of $2,250. Subsequently, it sent a delegation to Archbishop Patrick A. Feehan to petition for a parish. Archbishop Feehan granted the request and appointed Rev. Casimir A. Slominski as pastor. A former assistant at St. Adalbert's, Father Slominski began his work in Cicero on May 30, 1895.

Stephen Bartoszek, one of the pioneer parishioners, transformed his hall at the northwest corner of Jessamine (now 48th Court) and 30th Street into a combination church-school and he offered the rear flat as living quarters for the pastor. In this temporary church, Father Slominski celebrated Mass and administered the sacraments until a frame church was built a few months later. In July 1898, Father Slominski directed the construction of a one-room frame building behind the church. This structure, known as the parish hall, also served as a school.

When Father Slominski resigned because of poor health in 1899, Rev. Leo Wyrzykowski was named pastor of St. Mary of Częstochowa Church. Father Slominski later organized St. Ann Church at 18th Place and Leavitt Street in Chicago where he served as pastor from 1903 to 1921.

In 1902, the mission of St. Attracta was established at 13th Street and 48th Court for English-speaking Catholics who lived in the northeast section of Cicero, then known as the Grant Works area. In 1903, the Western Electric Company opened a plant in Hawthorne at 22nd Street (Cermak Road) and Cicero Avenue and it quickly became the largest employer in Cicero. Over the years, the Western Electric Company provided jobs for thousands of immigrants of many nationalities.

Following Father Wyrzykowski's appointment as pastor of St. Mary of Gostyń Church in Downers Grove, Illinois (now in the Joliet diocese) in July 1904, Rev. Bronislaus Czajkowski became pastor of St. Mary of Częstochowa Church. Prior to this assignment, he had served as an assistant at the Polish parish of St. Mary of Perpetual Help in Chicago.

The new pastor found that the frame church and school had become inadequate and as a temporary measure, converted the parish hall behind the church into two classrooms. In August 1904, the Sisters of St. Joseph of the Third order of Francis of Assisi began their work in the parish school which previously had been staffed by lay teachers.

With the generous support of his parishioners, Father Czajkowski was made plans for a new combination church-school building, the cornerstone of which was laid on July 2, 1905. This imposing brick structure was completed at the southeast corner of 30th Street and Linden (49th) Avenue In 1908, the Sisters moved from their living quarters in the school building into a new convent which had been constructed at 3009 South 49th Court.

The Polish population of the South Lawndale area of Chicago, on Cicero's east boundary, increased to such an extent that in 1907, the Archdiocese of Chicago organized Good Shepherd parish at 28th Street and Kolin Avenue from portions of St. Mary of Częstochowa and St. Casimir parishes. In 1911, Polish families who formerly belonged to St. Mary of Częstochowa organized the national parish of St. Valentine at 13th Street and 50th Avenue. On July 24, 1915, 800 employees of the Western Electric Company died as the Eastland excursion boat capsized in the Chicago River. Twenty-nine parishioners lost their lives in that tragedy and were remembered in a memorial Mass.

In June 1916, the parish broke ground at the southwest corner of 48th Court and 30th Street for a magnificent Gothic revival structure. When the cornerstone of this edifice was laid on October 29, 1917, work was nearing completion on the present rectory at 3010 South 48th Court. Archbishop George W. Mundelein dedicated St. Mary of Częstochowa Church on March 10, 1918.

Hundreds of Poles gathered in the silver-bedecked church of St. Mary on May 31, 1920, to celebrate the 25th anniversary of the founding of their parish. Membership then numbered 800 families with 900 children enrolled in the school. A history of St. Mary of Częstochowa parish written in 1920 contained the information that "At present this parish consists of the church with its contents worth $135,000.00; school, worth $85,000.00; rectory, which is worth $30,000.00; convent, worth $25,000.00; frame ex-church [the parish hall]... worth $3,000.00; and lots worth about $25,000.00. Total worth,$303,000.00"

Father Czajkowski continued to serve as pastor throughout the Great Depression, a hard time for his parishioners who keenly felt the effects of factory closings in Cicero. He died October 13, 1939, at the age of 65. Rev. Francis Nogajewski served as administrator of the parish until July 1940, when Rev. Theodore F. Langfort was named pastor. A former assistant at St. Mary of Częstochowa parish, Father Langfort had served as pastor of St. Valentine Church in Cicero and as pastor of the Polish parish of Assumption, BVM in Chicago.

The new pastor carried out a program of reconstruction and expansion that included repair and remodeling all the parish buildings and redecoration of the church in preparation for upcoming the golden jubilee, May 6, 1945. In its 50th year, St. Mary of Częstochowa parish numbered more than 1,600 families and the parish supported 43 societies.

Father Langfort continued to serve as pastor of this large Polish parish until his death on November 27, 1956, at the age of 73. In January 1957, Rev. Ignatius S. Renklewski became pastor. A former assistant at St. Mary of Częstochowa parish, he returned to Cicero from Chicago where he had been serving as administrator of the Polish parish of St. Ann.

Father Renklewski made plans for an addition to the convent which was completed early in 1958 and he also purchased a statue of Our Lady of Częstochowa which he placed in front of the rectory. This outdoor shrine was dedicated on September 16, 1959 in ceremonies which included a procession of religious groups singing Marian songs. On February 7, 1960, Father Renklewski was invested as a Domestic Prelate with the title Right Reverend Monsignor.

On November 13, 1960, the diocesan officials granted permission to construct a Youth Center on the site of the former Hawthorne School at 5004 South 31st Street. A dream come true for the parish, this one-story building was financed in large part by the proceeds from carnivals held in the parish from 1946 to 1960. Albert Gregory Meyer laid the cornerstone of the Youth Center on February 19, 1961; while work was underway on this structure, a program of renovation began on May 28, 1961 that modernized and expanded the church and refurbished the school and rectory. Since the dedication of the $300,000 Youth Center on September 17, 1961, this building had provided the finest of facilities for the young people of the community.

Msgr. Renklewski died on March 26, 1965, at the age of 76. In his obituary, The New World noted that: He was a former member of the Archdiocesan school board completing his term in 1961; was chaplain of the Polish Roman Catholic Union of America, a member of the board of the Polish Roman Catholic cemetery association, and a Fourth degree member of Garcia Moreno council, Knights of Columbus (Harvey).

Rev. Joseph C. Przybylowicz, former pastor of St. Isidore Church in Blue Island, Illinois, was appointed pastor of St. Mary's parish on March 4, 1966. He led planning for the parish's 75th anniversary.

On October 11, 1970, Bishop Aloysius J. Wycislo of Green Bay, Wisconsin. officiated at the special Diamond Jubilee Mass. A graduate of St. Mary's school, Bishop Wycislo served as Auxiliary Bishop of Chicago prior to his appointment as Ordinary of the Green Bay Diocese in 1968. At the time of the 75th celebration, 16 young men from St. Mary of Częstochowa parish had been ordained priests, and 28 young women had entered religious orders. Mrs. Frances Wilary catered and donated a dinner held in the parish hail following the jubilee Mass for all clergy, religious, choir members, Knights of Columbus, and special guests. A civic observance, a commemorative dinner-dance honoring the faithful members of the parish, was held on October 25, 1970, at Richard's Banquet Room, 3243 South Harlem Avenue in Berwyn, Illinois.

On January 1, 1979, Father Przybylowicz was named pastor emeritus and Rev. Thaddeus J. Makuch was appointed pastor of St. Mary's Church. Prior to this appointment, Father Makuch had served as associate pastor of SS. Peter and Paul Church at 37th and Paulina Streets in Chicago for five years.

On July 1, 2003, priests of the Redemptorist Congregation arrived in Cicero. The Polish Redemptorists began serving the spiritual need of this trilingual parish. Custom and language are part of celebrations, and St. Mary's celebrates the Feast of Our Lady of Częstochowa in August with special Masses, procession through the neighborhood, ethnic food, and the final gathering for the ice cream social. On December 12 of each year, the Feast of Our Lady of Guadalupe begins with Mañanitas at 5:00 a.m., a special Mass with the distribution of roses, and a social gathering enjoying hot chocolate. Many couples who choose St. Mary's for their wedding place a bouquet before the icon of Our Lady of Guadalupe or Our Lady of Częstochowa as part of the service.

The church and school complex built in 1905 is still used today for the parish school and religious education programs. The convent building today houses the chancery for the Syro-Malabar Eastern Rite congregation for the Diocese of the United States and Canada. The Youth Center building, now called The Social Center, is the site for the school's physical education classes, athletic program, an active senior group, and the public school preschool program.

For over 100 years St. Mary of Częstochowa Parish has offered daily Mass, Sunday Masses and special services in three languages, novenas, missions, a place for the adoration of Christ in the Holy Eucharist and a sacred space to celebrate the reception of the sacraments.

== Architecture ==
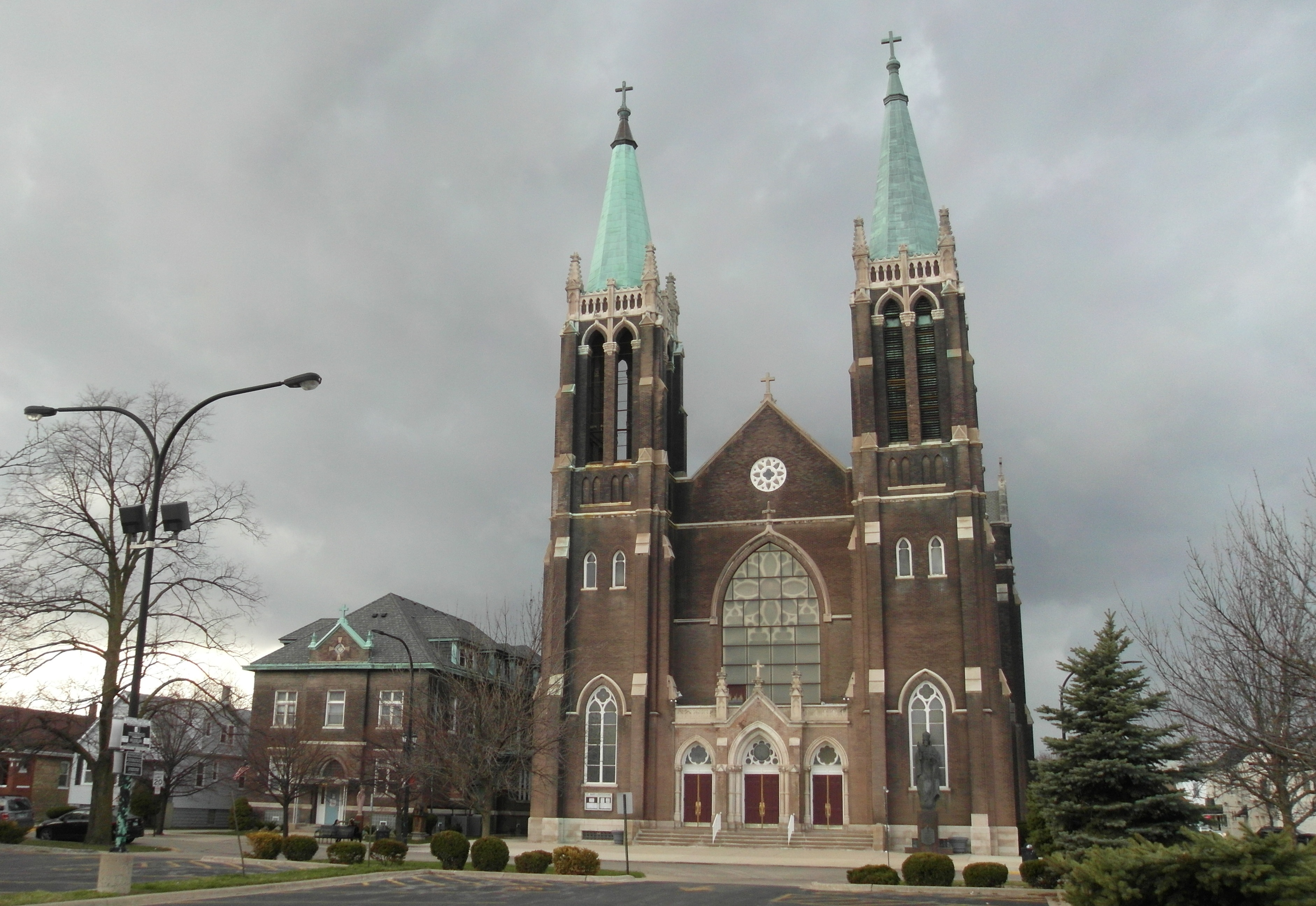
St. Mary of Częstochowa church in Cicero, Illinois

The church, one of the few Polish churches designed in a Gothic style, was completed in 1918. The twin towers of this church, which rise 200 ft (61 m) above the ground, are visible from many points in Cicero. The beautiful Gothic altars, pulpit, and a communion rail - all crafted in Italy of Carrara marble - date from 1927. High atop the main altar, which was dedicated to Our Lady of Częstochowa, is a copy of the celebrated "Black Madonna", the miraculous icon ascribed to the evangelist St. Luke. Shrines to Our Lady of Guadalupe and Our Lady of Ludźmierz are recent additions to celebrate the traditions of the parishes numerous Mexican and Góral parishioners.

== Patron ==
The parish is named in reverence to the shrine of the Black Madonna on Jasna Góra in Poland.

== Church in architecture books ==
- Sinkevitch, Alice (2004). The AIA Guide to Chicago. Harvest Books. ISBN 0-15-602908-1.
- Schulze, Franz; Harrington, Kevin (2003). Chicago's Famous Buildings. University Of Chicago Press. ISBN 978-022674064-5.
- McNamara, Denis R. (2005). Heavenly City: The Architectural Tradition of Catholic Chicago. Liturgy Training Publications.
- Chiat, Marylin (2004). The Spiritual Traveler: Chicago and Illinois: A Guide to Sacred Sites and Peaceful Places. HiddenSpring.
- Lane, George A. (1982). Chicago Churches and Synagogues: An Architectural Pilgrimage. Loyola Press.
- Kantowicz, Edward R. (2007). The Archdiocese of Chicago: A Journey of Faith. Booklink.
- Kociolek, Jacek (2002). Kościoły Polskie w Chicago {Polish Churches of Chicago} (in Polish). Ex Libris.

== See also ==
- Polish Cathedral style churches of Chicago
- Polish Americans
- Roman Catholicism in Poland
- Poles in Chicago
