= Grand Central Hotel =

Former hotel in New York City

Coordinates: 40°43′39″N 73°59′43″W

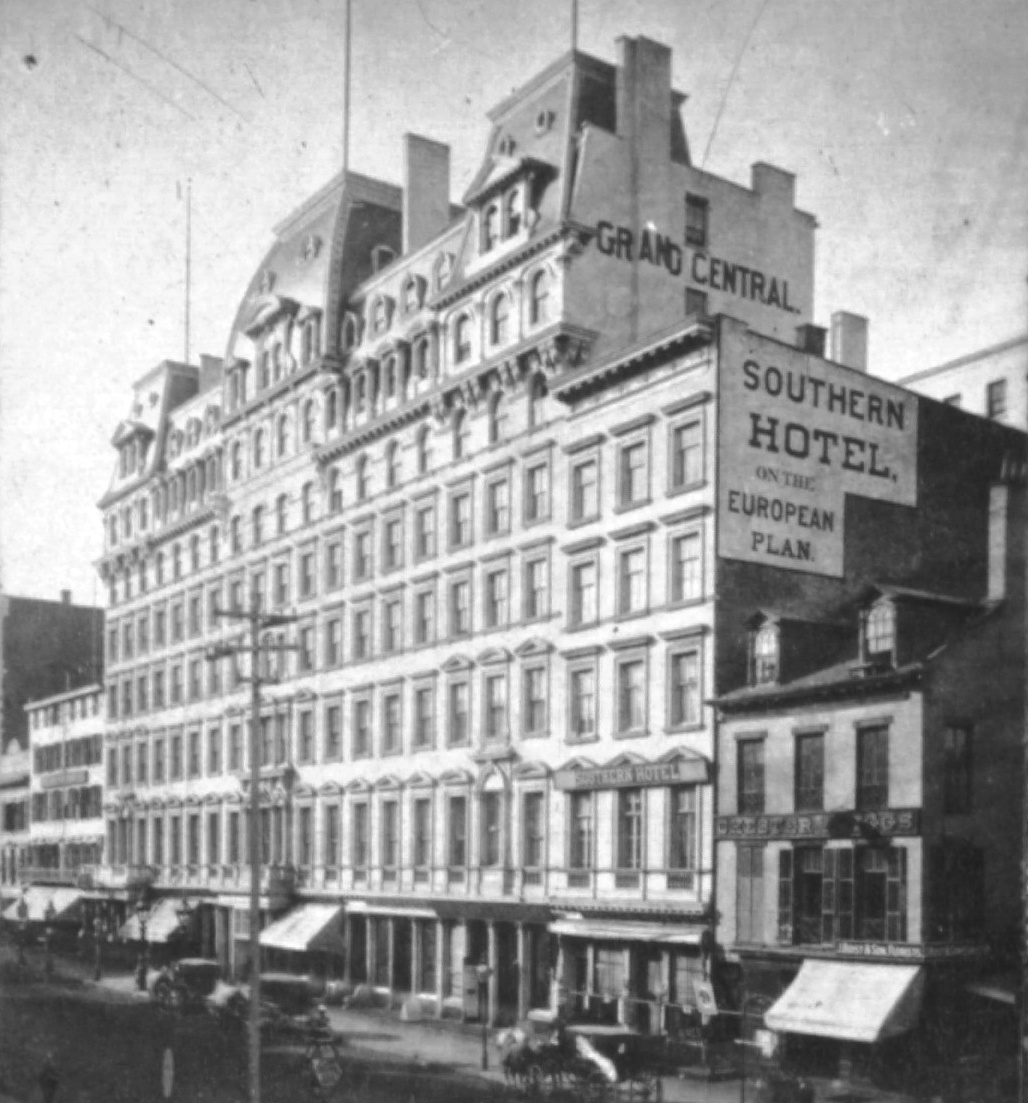
- The hotel in the latter half of the 19th century
- Interactive map of the Grand Central Hotel area

General information
- Location: Manhattan, New York City
- Opened: 1870
- Demolished: 1973 (collapsed)

Design and construction
- Architect: Henry Engelbert

The Grand Central Hotel, later renamed the Broadway Central Hotel, was a hotel at 673 Broadway at West 3rd Street, in Manhattan, New York City, that was famous as the site of the murder of financier James Fisk in 1872 by Edward S. Stokes.

The hotel collapsed on August 3, 1973, killing four residents and injuring at least twelve.

== History ==
This hotel, which opened in 1870, was designed by Henry Engelbert, and was commissioned by Elias S. Higgins, a local carpet manufacturer. The hotel's facade was reminiscent of Engelbert's Grand Hotel on Broadway and West 31st Street, which was also commissioned by Higgins. Both of these hotels by Engelbert were characterized by elaborate mansards with dormers in the French Second Empire style, although the Grand Central Hotel was clearly the larger and more elaborate of the two.

THE LARGEST HOTEL IN AMERICA

Few people who pass through Broadway are aware that on that bustling thoroughfare, between Amity and Bleecker streets, there is now in course of erection, on the site of the old Lafarge Hotel, one of the largest and most magnificent hotels on the Western Continent, which, when completed, will throw in the shade the largest hotels in this country - rivalling even the "Grand Hotel" at Paris in magnificence. Since the disastrous fire in April, 1867, which destroyed the Winter Garden Theatre, under the Lafarge House, that hotel has been closed.

In March last it was sold at public auction by the heirs of the Lafarge estate E. S. Higgins, Esq., who is recorded fourth on the list of wealthy citizens for the sum of $1,000,000. This gentleman determined on erecting the largest hotel in the country, and will doubtless succeed, as when completed the new hotel will contain 630 rooms, 200 more than either the Fifth Avenue, Metropolitan or St. Nicholas Hotel, and 100 more than the celebrated Lindell Hotel at St. Louis, which was burned some three years ago; 200 of the rooms will be parlors en suite. It is to be named the Southern Hotel, and is designed to accommodate 1,200 guests. It will be eight stories in height, surmounted by three gothic towers on the Broadway front. Three elevators, which will perform the trip from the first floor to the attic in thirty seconds, will be in use for the benefit of guests night and day. One item alone - upholstery and furniture - will involve an expenditure of $1,000,000. The articles mentioned having been ordered from Paris and this city.

The halls and rooms will require carpeting sufficient to cover seven acres [28,000 m²], and will be of the finest quality - Brussels and velvet. All the rooms will be heated with steam, and on each floor hydrants, hose, and everything necessary will be furnished to extinguish fire. There will be three large dining-rooms extending from the main hall on the second story to the Mercer street wall, the largest of which will accommodate 500 guests. There are at present 350 men employed on the building, and the contractor calculates that he will complete it by the 1st of June next but the hotel will not be open for the reception of guests until the following August. When completed, it will have cost the proprietor $1,600,000.

On February 2, 1876, 8 baseball teams formed what became the National League of Major League Baseball at the Grand Central Hotel. The event was celebrated at the league's 50 and 75th anniversaries at the hotel.

== Collapse ==
On August 3, 1973, allegedly due in part to illegal alterations on a basement bearing wall, a section of the Broadway facade of the structure, then known as the University Hotel, collapsed onto Broadway, killing four residents of the hotel. By this time the building had deteriorated into a welfare hotel, but it housed Art Bar, a successor for a brief time as a venue for the artists and sculptors who had congregated at Max's Kansas City. On the Mercer Street side of the hotel there was the Mercer Arts Center, a complex of live theaters operated by Sy and Cynthia Kaback. The collapse occurred just hours before the theaters were due to be filled with hundreds of patrons. The remains of the hotel were demolished, and New York University subsequently built a 22-story dormitory for law students on the site.

== See also ==
- List of buildings and structures on Broadway in Manhattan
- List of former hotels in Manhattan
