= Henry Engelbert =

German-American architect

- Born: 1826; Germany
- Died: 1901 (aged 74–75); Detroit, United States
- Occupation: Architect
- Buildings: Grand Hotel, New York; St. Albertus Roman Catholic Church, Detroit; St. Mary of Perpetual Help Roman Catholic Church, Chicago

Henry Engelbert (1826–1901) was a German-American architect. He was best known for buildings in the French Second Empire style, which emphasized elaborate mansard roofs with dormers. New York's Grand Hotel on Broadway is the most noteworthy extant example of Engelbert's work in this style. Many of his commissions were Lutheran or Roman Catholic churches.

== Life ==
Engelbert was born in Germany in 1826. In 1852, he established his practice in partnership with John Edson, and their office was at 85 Nassau Street in New York City. The latter years of his career were spent in Detroit, where he died in 1901.

== Notable buildings: New York City ==
In chronological order:

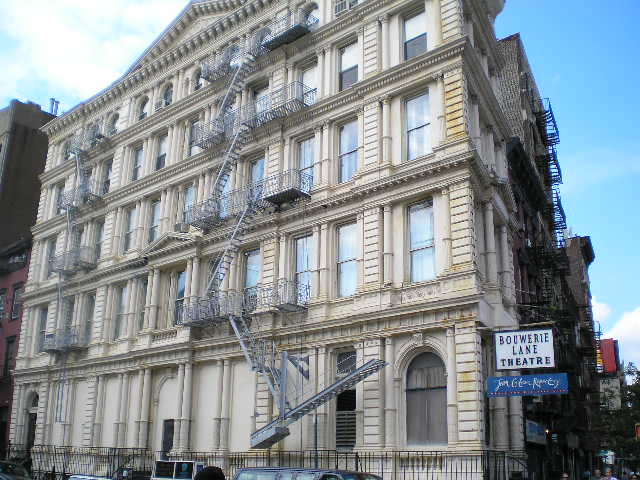
Bouwerie Lane Theatre (1874)

- Fifth Avenue Baptist Church, 1856, since demolished. The architects of this church are given as "Edson and Engelbert", referring to John Edson, Engelbert's office partner.
- College of Mount Saint Vincent Administration Building (originally Convent and Academy of Mount Saint Vincent), 1859, 6301 Riverdale Avenue at West 263rd Street.
- Church of Our Lady of Sorrows (now Mision Guadalupana), 1867–1868, 101-103 Pitt Street at Stanton Street.

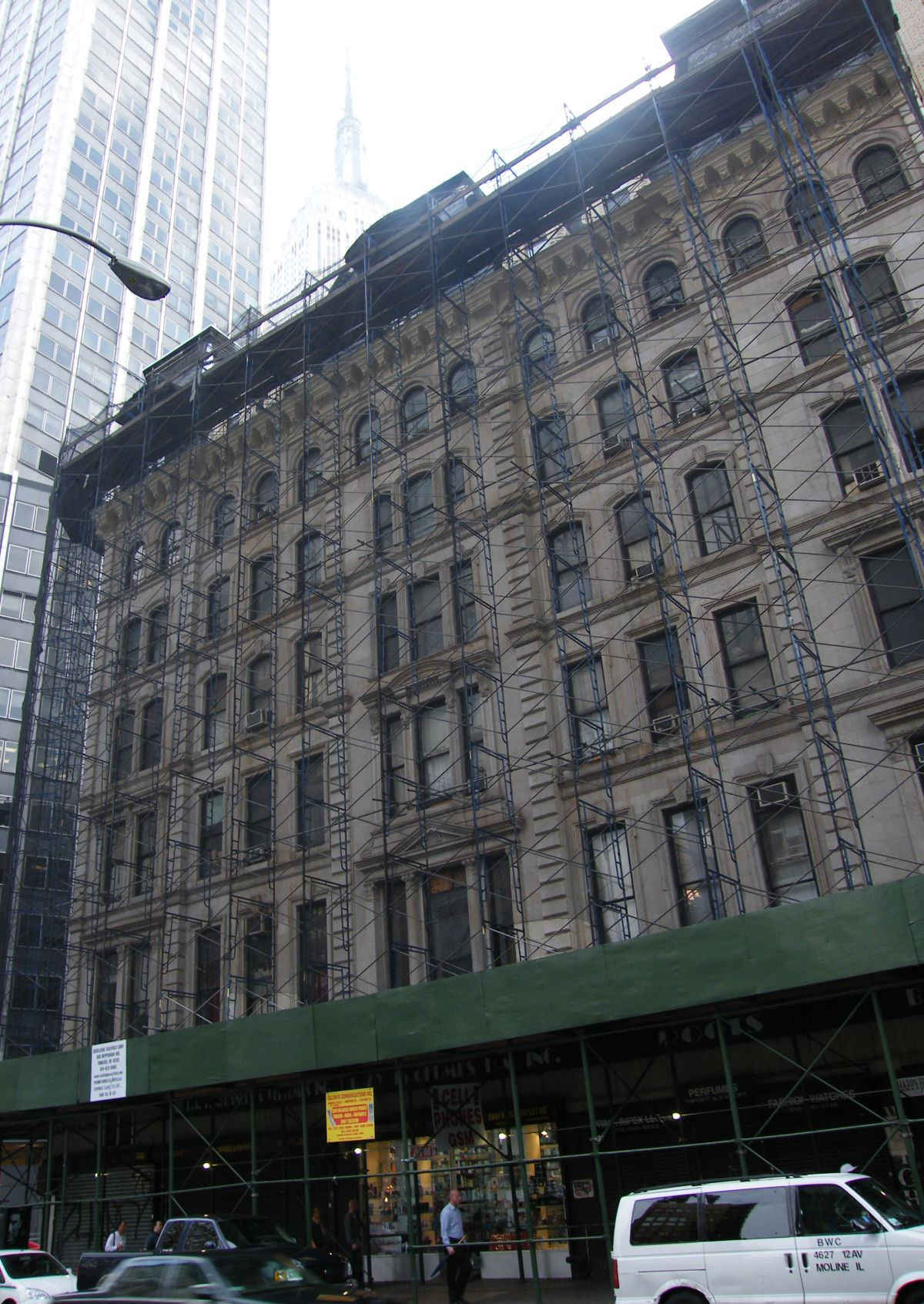
Grand Hotel (now Clark Apartments) (1868)

- Grand Hotel (now Clark Apartments), 1868, 1232-1238 Broadway at West 31st Street. It was built in the French Second Empire style for carpet magnate Elias S. Higgins, who later commissioned Engelbert to design the Grand Central Hotel.
- St. Patrick's Old Cathedral, New York, 1868 restoration by Engelbert of the original 1815 structure designed by Joseph Mangin. This church, located at 260-264 Mulberry Street, has been famous for its role in the New York Draft Riots of 1863 and in the book and film, The Gangs of New York, which dealt with those events. This St. Patrick's should not be confused with the current St. Patrick's Cathedral, New York on Fifth Avenue.
- Church of the Transfiguration (formerly Zion English Lutheran Church), 1868 renovations to the original 1801 structure, 25 Mott Street. This church has a Georgian Gothic style. Engelbert was responsible for 1868 renovations, principally the addition of the current bell tower. This structure should not be confused with the Episcopal church of the same name on East 29th Street.
- Elias S. Higgins Warehouse and Store, (1868–1869): 424-426 Broadway. This six-story building has a cast iron facade and was designed in a French Second Empire style for carpet manufacturer Elias S. Higgins. This is one of three buildings that Higgins commissioned Engelbert to design. The building has been converted into residential lofts.
- Church of St. Vincent de Paul (completed 1869): 123 West 23 Street. This parish was founded in 1840 on Canal Street to serve the expanding French-speaking population of the city. The parish moved to the Chelsea neighborhood of the city after the Civil War in order to follow its congregants. The church closed in 2013, and the building is currently not in use.
- Holy Cross Roman Catholic Church (Church of the Holy Cross) (1870), 329-333 West 42nd Street. This Byzantine style church near Times Square was associated with Father Francis P. Duffy, the famed army chaplain of World War I.
- Grand Central Hotel (later Broadway Central Hotel) (1870), 673 Broadway. This was the second commission for a hotel that Engelbert received from carpet magnate Elias S. Higgins, and in many ways it is a larger, more flamboyant version of Engelbert's 1868 Grand Hotel further north on Broadway. In 1973 this hotel abruptly collapsed, killing four residents. It appears that the removal of load-bearing walls in the basement, as part of a remodeling project, led to the structure's collapse.
- Bouwerie Lane Theatre (previously Bond Street Savings Bank Building, and originally Atlantic Savings Bank Building), 1874, 330 Bowery. This building, with its cast iron facade, combines Corinthian columns with Second French Empire elements.

== Notable buildings: other locations ==
In chronological order:

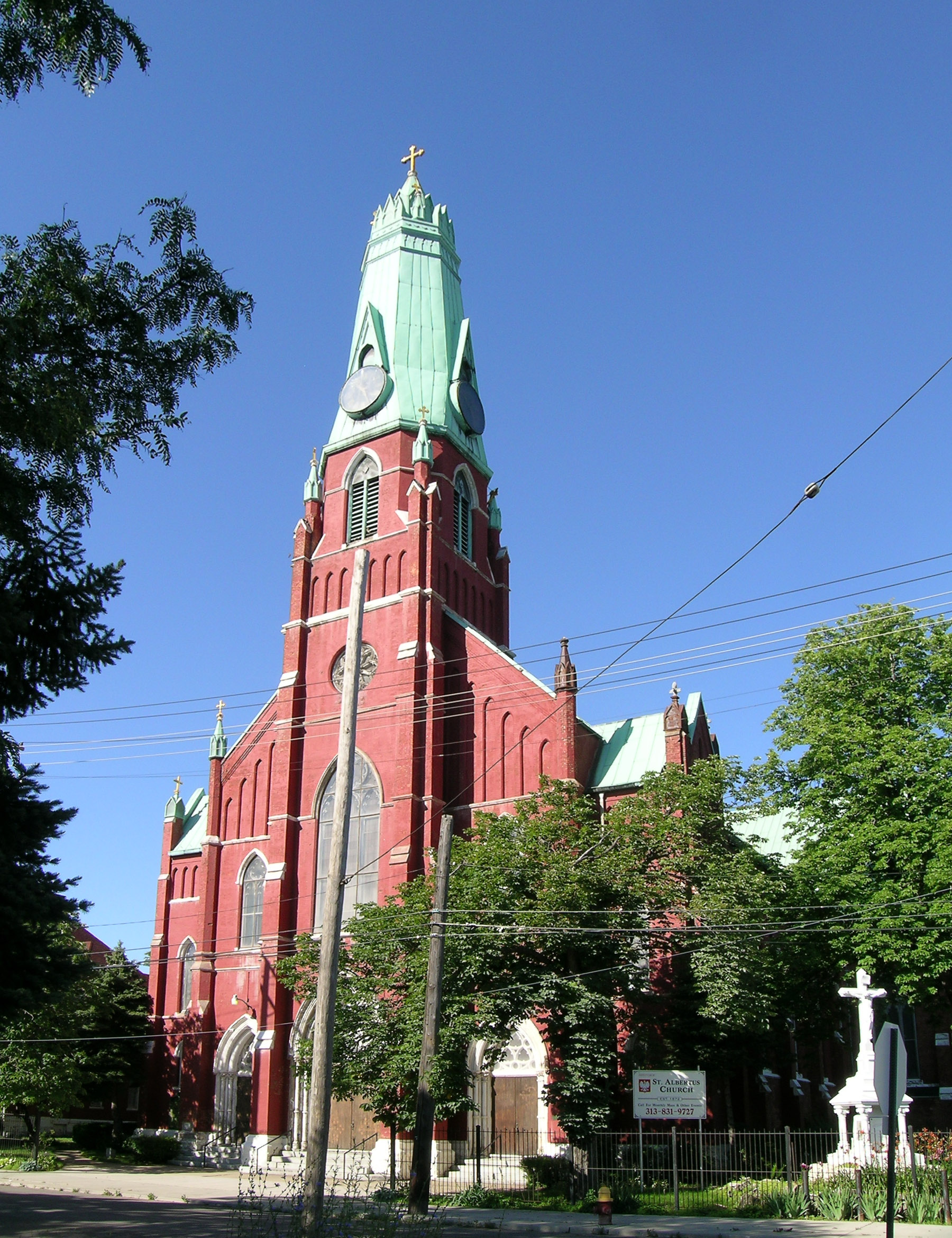
St. Albertus Roman Catholic Church, Detroit (1885)

- St. Mary's Abbey Church, 1856–1857, Martin Luther King Boulevard at William Street, Newark, New Jersey. Now known as Newark Abbey.
- Trinity Evangelical Lutheran Church and Parsonage, 1874–1975, 72 Spring Street at Hone Street, Kingston, New York.
- Sampson-Freeman Building, 1875, 1 Broadway at West Strand, Kingston, New York. This three-story building originally consisted of a store on the ground floor, with an opera house on the upper floors. A mansard roof and tower were lost in an 1885 fire. However, cast iron pillars at the ground level have survived to the present day.
- St. Albertus Roman Catholic Church, 1885, 4231 St. Aubin Street, Detroit, Michigan. This structure was built for Detroit's Polish Catholics in a style that has been described as Polish Gothic Revival.
- St. Mary of Perpetual Help Roman Catholic Church, 1892, 1035 West 32nd Street, Chicago, Illinois. This Romanesque church was built for the Polish Catholic community of Chicago's South Side.
