= Worthmann & Steinbach =

Chicago-based architectural firm

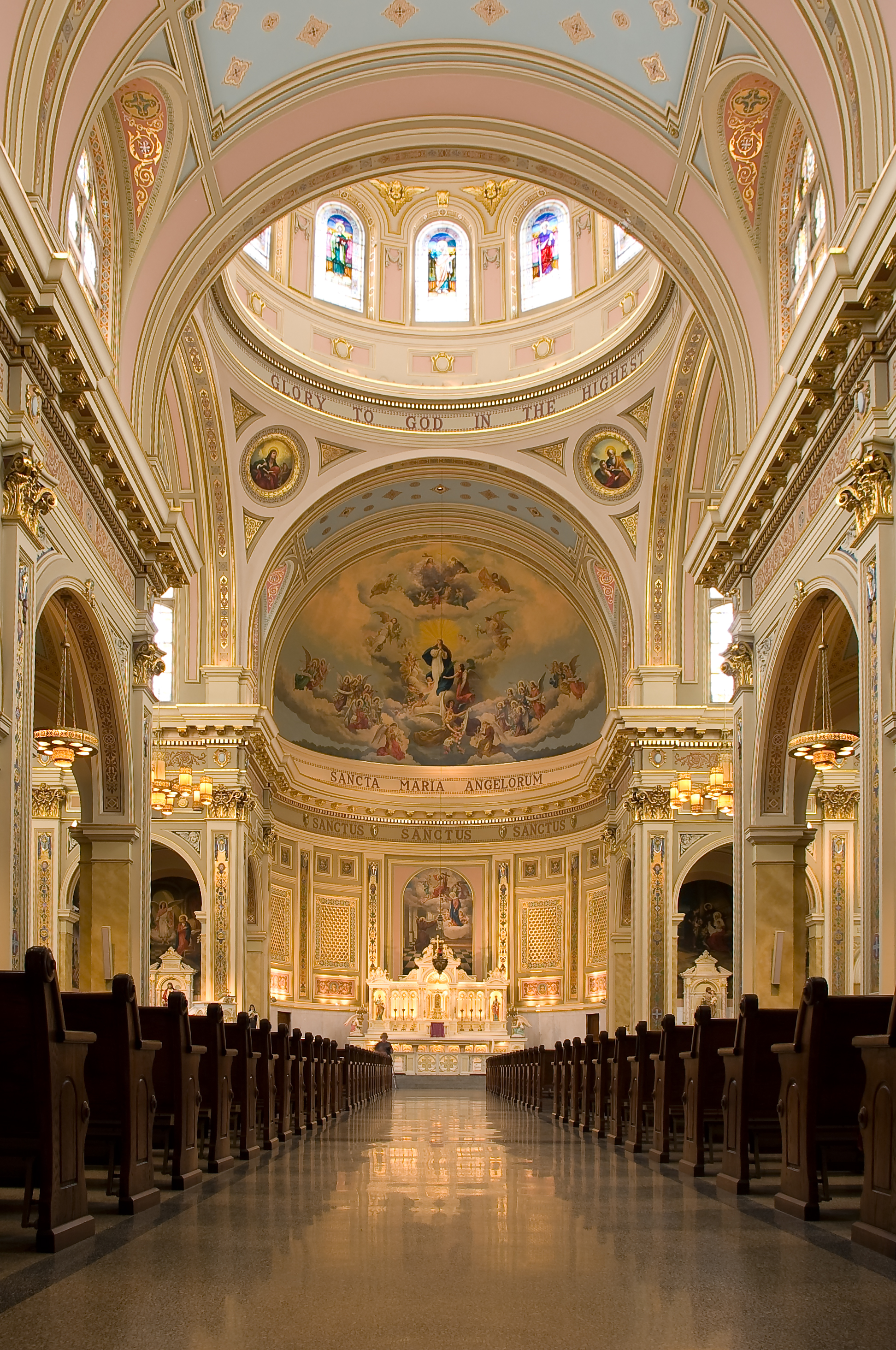
St Mary of the Angels' Church (Chicago, Illinois)

Worthmann & Steinbach was a Chicago-based architectural firm that was active from 1903 through 1928. It was a partnership between Henry W. Worthmann (June 18, 1857 – April 11, 1946) and John G. Steinbach (b. 1878)

The firm is best remembered for its design of large and elaborate churches in the Chicago area which were built for Roman Catholic, Eastern Catholic, and Lutheran clients. Worthmann and Steinbach were also active outside of Chicago and eventually built for clients in Indiana, Michigan and Wisconsin.

== Works ==
- The Basilica of St. Hyacinth, Chicago, IL
- Hollenbach Building, Chicago, IL
- Holy Innocents Church, Chicago, IL
- Jehova Evangelical Lutheran Church, Chicago, IL
- Nativity of the Blessed Virgin Mary Church, Chicago, IL
- Our Lady of Lourdes Church, Chicago, IL (original building later enlarged and relocated by Joseph W. McCarthy)
- St. Barbara Church, Chicago, IL
- St. Casimir Church (now Our Lady of Tepeyac), Chicago, IL
- St. Casimir Church, South Bend, IN
- St. James Lutheran Church, Chicago, IL
- St. John Berchmans Church, Chicago, IL
- St. Joseph Shrine, Chicago, IL
- St. Joseph Church, West Allis, WI
- St. Mary of Czestochowa Church, Cicero, IL
- St. Mary of the Angels Church, Chicago, IL
- St. Nicholas Ukrainian Catholic Cathedral, Chicago, IL
- St. Peter Church, La Porte, IN
- St. Peter's United Church of Christ, Frankfort, IL
- St Stanislaus Bishop and Martyr Church, Chicago, IL
- Salem Lutheran Church, Blue Island, IL
- The Shrine of Our Lady of Pompeii, Chicago, IL
