= Church of Our Lady of Sorrows (New York City) =

Catholic church in Manhattan, New York

Coordinates: 40°43′8.68″N 73°58′56.78″W

The Church of Our Lady of Sorrows
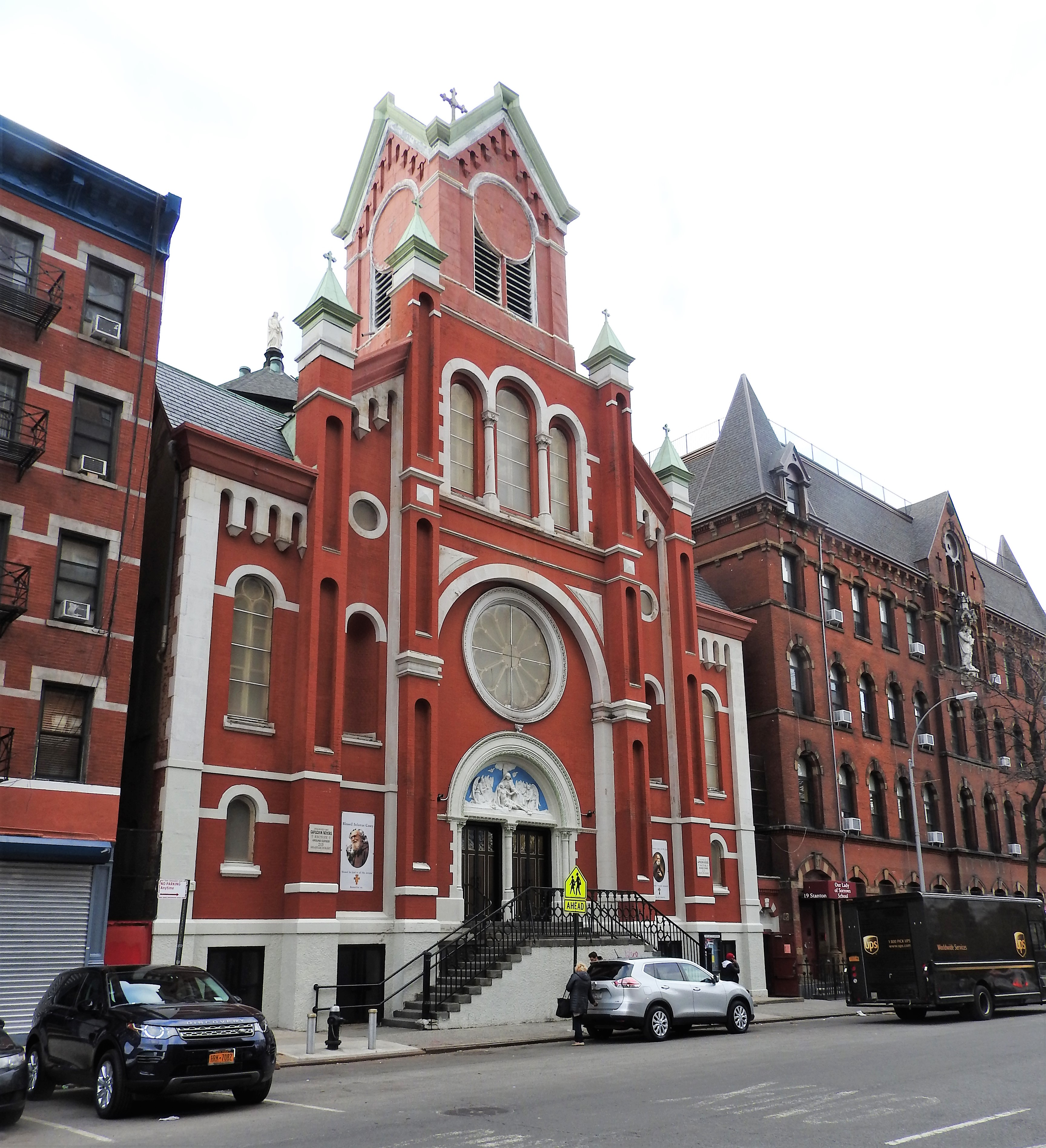
- Interactive map of the The Church of Our Lady of Sorrows area

General information
- Architectural style: Victorian; Romanesque Revival; Byzantine Revival
- Location: Manhattan, New York City, United States
- Construction started: 1867
- Completed: 1868
- Client: Roman Catholic Archdiocese of New York

Design and construction
- Architect: Henry Engelbert

Website
- https://olsnyc.org / https://ols.weconnect.com

The Church of Our Lady of Sorrows (Spanish: Nuestra Señora de los Dolores) is a Roman Catholic parish church in the Roman Catholic Archdiocese of New York, located at 105 Pitt Street between Rivington Street and Stanton Street on the Lower East Side of Manhattan in New York City. The area formerly served Catholics who lived in the immigrant enclave of Kleindeutschland (Little Germany).

== History ==
The Church of Our Lady of Sorrows was established in 1867 as Our Lady of the Seven Dolors Church and staffed by the Capuchin Friars. It served as the national parish for the large number of German Catholics who immigrated to New York in the late nineteenth century. Later it became a parish for Italian and then Hispanic immigrants.

== Building ==
Our Lady of Sorrows was built 1867–1868 in the Victorian, Byzantine Revival, and Romanesque Revival style by Henry Engelbert. Archbishop John McCloskey dedicated the church on September 6, 1868.

== School ==
The parish school was among 27 closed by the Archdiocese under the Archbishop Timothy M. Dolan in January 2011.
