= Hollenbach Building =

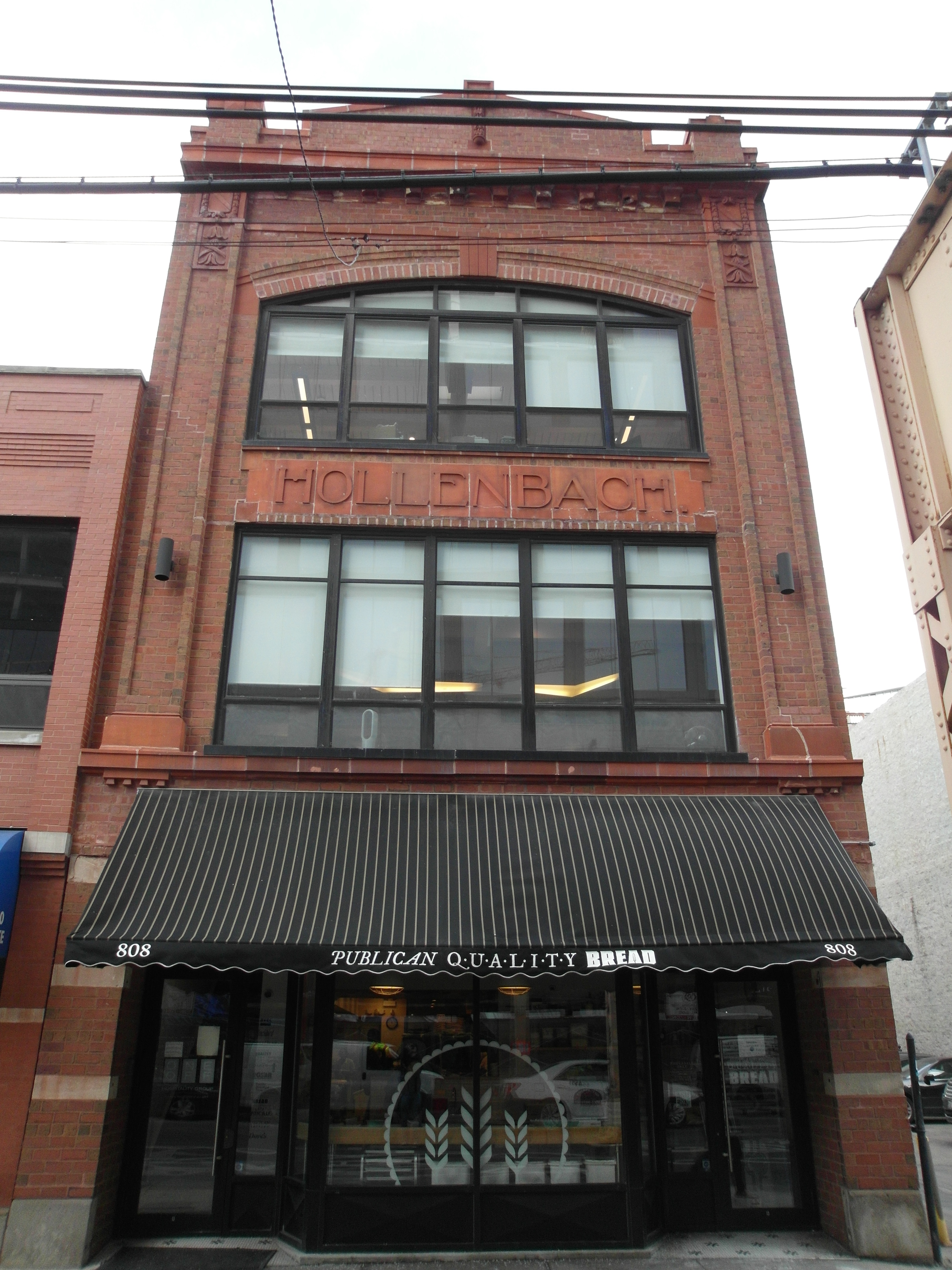
- Interactive map of the Hollenbach Building area

General information
- Location: 808 W. Lake Street, Chicago, Illinois
- Coordinates: 41°53′9.0″N 87°38′52.4″W
- Completed: 1912
- Demolished: January 2021

Technical details
- Floor count: 3
- Floor area: 7,125 square feet (661.9 m^{2})

Design and construction
- Architect: Worthmann & Steinbach

The Hollenbach Building was a building located at 808 W. Lake Street in Chicago's Fulton Market District, designed by Worthmann & Steinbach and built in 1912. It was built for $12,000 and was owned by Charles Hollenbach, housing the Hollenbach Seed Company. An addition was proposed in 1919 to be designed by Worthmann & Steinbach, but no permit was ever issued for its construction. Hollenbach Seed Company left the building in 1958, moving to the northwest suburbs.

Kathy Kozan purchased the building for $190,000 in 1994, after initially leasing it. She was its third owner and renovated the building. The building served as the home of Kozan Design Studios, a company that created custom art for trade shows, theaters, theme parks, and other clients until 2010. It also contained an apartment where Kozan resided. During this period, the building was filled with unique, colorful sculptures.

In 2013, the building was sold to One Off Hospitality Group for $1.7 million. The first floor would house One Off Hospitality Group's Publican Quality Bread. In 2019, developer North Park Ventures announced its plans to demolish the Hollenbach Building and adjacent buildings and build a 19-story hotel and office building. A demolition permit was issued on December 9, 2020, and the building was demolished in January 2021.
