= Holy Innocents Church (Chicago) =

Coordinates: 41°53′43.4″N 87°39′55.6″W

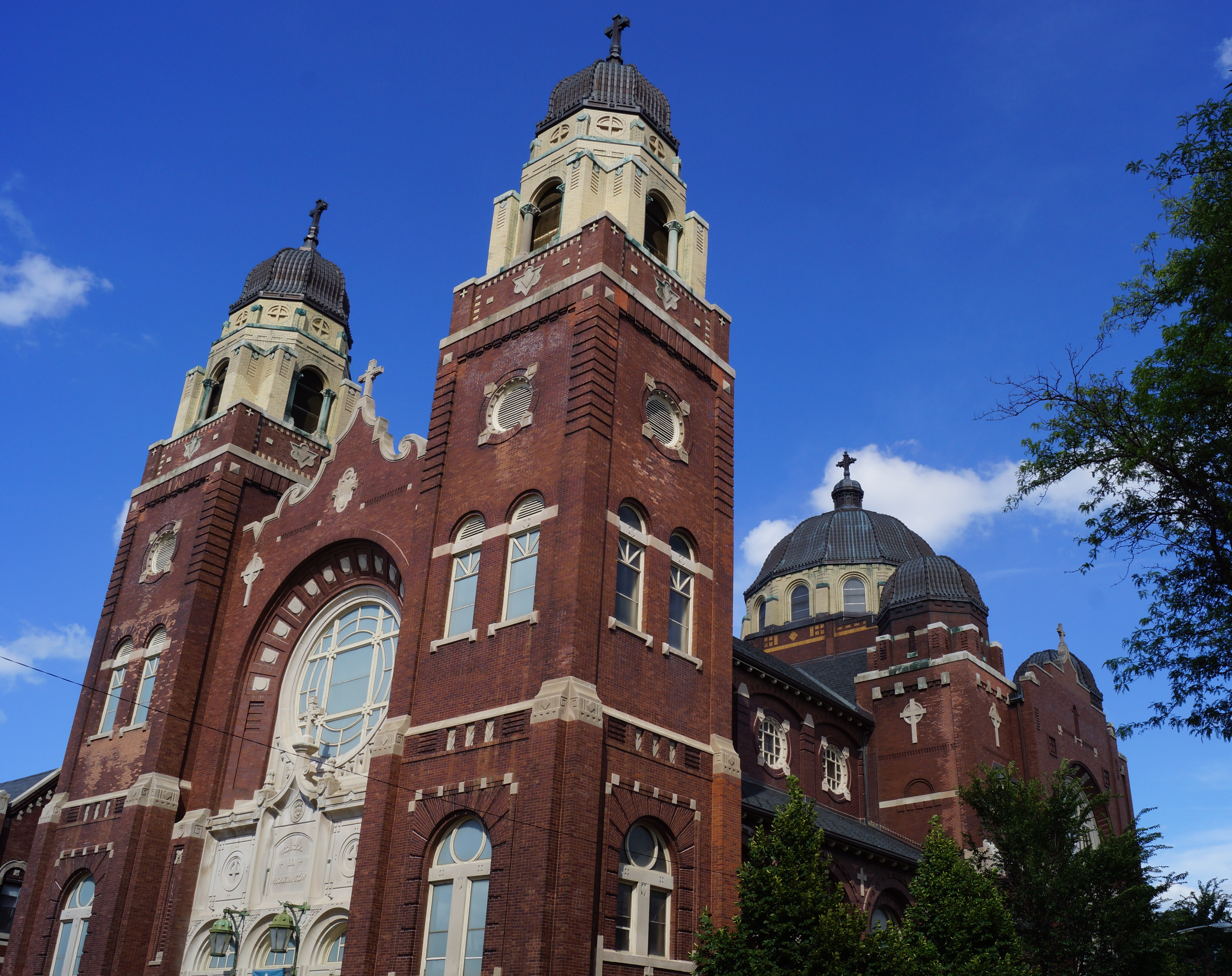
- Holy Innocents Church from the southwest

- Location within the United States
- Location: 743 North Armour Street; Chicago, Illinois
- Country: USA
- Denomination: Roman Catholic Church
- Website: Holy Innocents Parish

History
- Former name: St. John Evangelical Lutheran Church
- Status: Church
- Founded: 1905
- Founder: Polish immigrants
- Dedication: Holy Innocents
- Dedicated: December 10, 1905

Architecture
- Functional status: Active
- Heritage designation: For Polish immigrants
- Architect: Worthmann and Steinbach
- Architectural type: Church
- Style: Romanesque Revival
- Completed: 1912

Specifications
- Materials: Brick

Holy Innocents Church, (Polish: Kościół Świętych Młodzianków), is a church of the Roman Catholic Archdiocese of Chicago located at 743 North Armour Street in the East Village neighborhood of Chicago, Illinois. It is a prime example of the so-called "Polish Cathedral style" of churches in both its opulence and grand scale.

== History ==
Founded in 1905 as a Polish parish, the church was one of a network of Polish churches within the old Polish Downtown. The first school and church were in buildings bought from the St. John Evangelical Lutheran Church that had been built in 1867. Holy Innocents remained an ethnic Polish parish until 1975, when it was assigned territorial boundaries. From 1999 to 2009, the former school served as the home of Bishop Alfred Abramowicz Seminary.

The parish retains its strong identification with Chicago Polonia while welcoming Hispanics and Catholics of other ethnic groups. Although there has been much recent gentrification in the neighborhood, the parish continues to minister in English, Polish and Spanish.

In 2021, the Chicago archdiocese combined Holy Innocents, St. Malachy + Precious Blood, and Santa Maria Addolorata to form the new parish, Blessed Maria Gabriella, with Fr. Matt Eyerman as pastor.

== Architecture ==
The church was designed by the architectural firm of Worthmann and Steinbach who built many of the magnificent Polish Cathedrals in Chicago. Completed in 1912, the church is built in a Romanesque Revival style with Byzantine flourishes. One distinguishing feature of the building is the six cupolas covered in brown tile. The crossing is capped by a large dome with cupolas at the exterior corner of each transept and one atop each of the bell towers on the west façade. The stained glass windows are imported from Austria and Poland. The structure is constructed of red brick with limestone accents. It sits on a short base of darker brownish brick. The interior was redesigned after a 1962 fire and restored for the Parish centennial in 2005. Words of welcome are engraved in three languages over the triple entrance doors- Welcome, Witamy and Bienvenidos.

The campus includes a rectory and school buildings which have been occupied since 2007 by Golder College Prep School.

== Church in architecture books ==
- McNamara, Denis R. (2005). Heavenly City: The Architectural Tradition of Catholic Chicago. Liturgy Training Publications.
- Kantowicz, Edward R. (2007). The Archdiocese of Chicago: A Journey of Faith. Booklink.
- Lane, George A. (1982). Chicago Churches and Synagogues: An Architectural Pilgrimage. Loyola Press.
- Kociolek, Jacek (2002). Kościoły Polskie w Chicago {Polish Churches of Chicago} (in Polish). Ex Libris.

== See also ==
- Tadeusz Żukotyński, Catholic fine art painter and mural artist
- Sr. Maria Stanisia, Polish-American fine art painter and restoration artist
- Jozef Mazur, Polish-American painter and stained-glass artist
- Polish Cathedral style churches of Chicago
- Polish Americans
- Poles in Chicago
- Polish Roman Catholic Union of America
- Roman Catholicism in Poland
