= St. Barbara Church (Chicago) =

Coordinates: 41.8425°N 87.6528°W

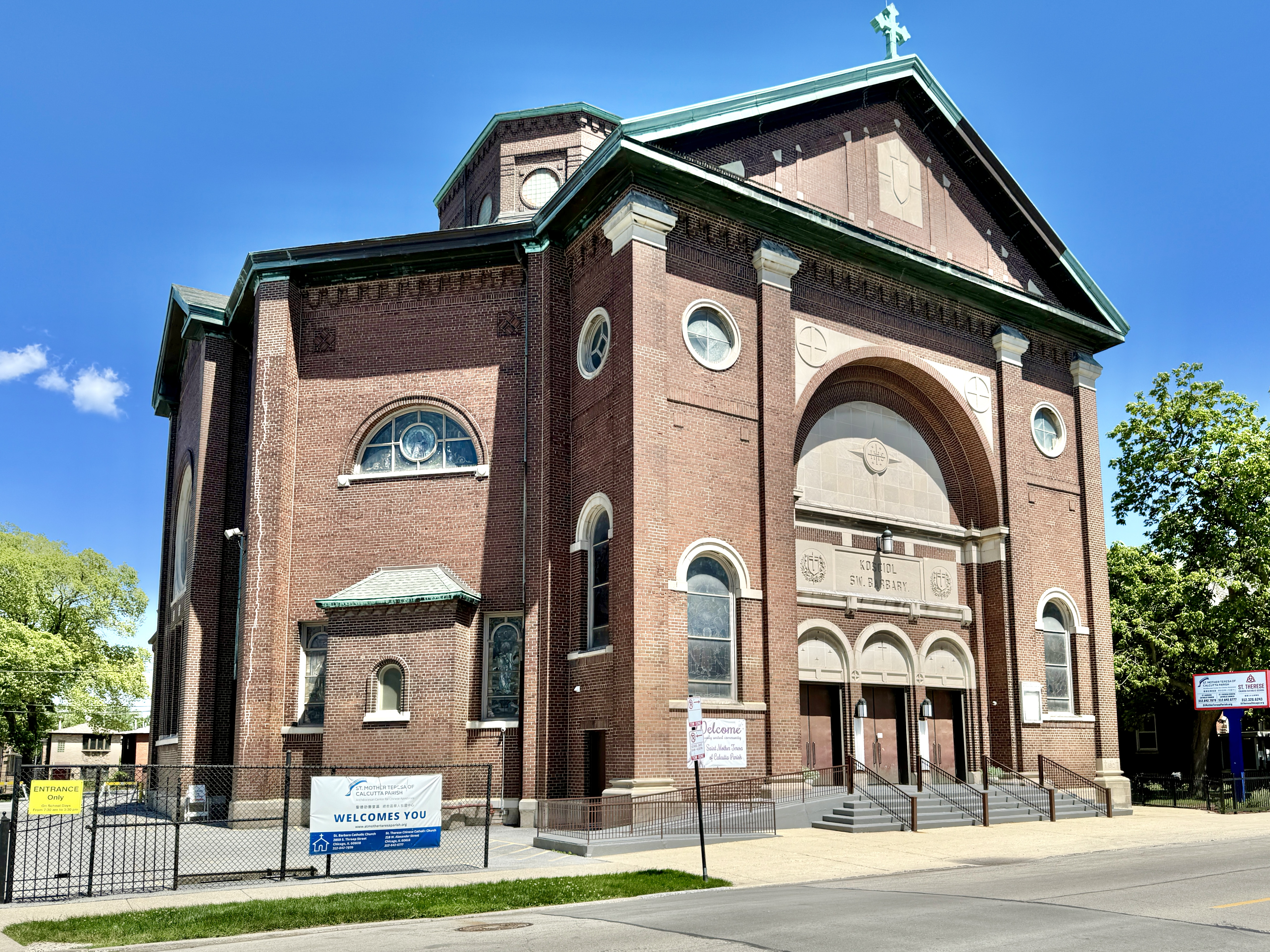
- St. Barbara's Church seen in 2024.

- Location within the United States
- Location: Chicago
- Country: United States
- Denomination: Roman Catholic
- Website: St. Barbara Parish

History
- Founded: 1909
- Founder: Polish immigrants
- Dedication: St. Barbara
- Dedicated: 1914

Architecture
- Functional status: Active
- Heritage designation: For Polish immigrants
- Architect: Worthmann and Steinbach
- Architectural type: Church
- Style: Polish Cathedral style
- Groundbreaking: 1912
- Completed: 1914

Specifications
- Materials: Brick

Administration
- Archdiocese: Chicago

St. Barbara's in Chicago (Polish: Kościół Świętej Barbary) - historic church of the Roman Catholic Archdiocese of Chicago located in Chicago, Illinois, at 2859 South Throop St.

It is a prime example of the Polish Cathedral style of churches in both its opulence and grand scale. Along with St. Mary of Perpetual Help, it is one of two monumental religious edifices that dominate the Bridgeport neighborhood's skyline.

== History ==
Founded in 1909 as a Polish parish to relieve overcrowding at St. Mary of Perpetual Help. Reverend Anthony Nawrocki, brother of St. Mary's pastor Stanislaus Nawrocki was the first pastor, thus the founding of the parish was a family affair in both the literal and figurative sense. In 2016, rumors began circulating surrounding the impending "Renew My Church" program. Rumors became reality in 2019 when the Archdiocese decided to "merge" St. Barbara with St. Therese Chinese Catholic School. However, unlike other "merge" plans in Renew My Church, St. Therese assumed possession of St. Barbara's school campus, administration, and rectory quarters.

== Architecture ==
The church was designed by the firm of Worthmann and Steinbach who built many of the magnificent Polish Cathedrals in Chicago. The Renaissance style edifice was completed in 1914, it is one of the few octagonal houses of worship in the archdiocese. There are 25 stunning stained glass windows, depicting the Gospel, and the lives of the saints.

== Church in architecture books ==
- Schulze, Franz; Harrington, Kevin (2003). Chicago's Famous Buildings. University Of Chicago Press.
- Chiat, Marylin (2004). The Spiritual Traveler: Chicago and Illinois: A Guide to Sacred Sites and Peaceful Places. HiddenSpring.
- Lane, George A. (1982). Chicago Churches and Synagogues: An Architectural Pilgrimage. Loyola Press.
- Kantowicz, Edward R. (2007). The Archdiocese of Chicago: A Journey of Faith. Booklink.
- Kociolek, Jacek (2002). Kościoły Polskie w Chicago {Polish Churches of Chicago} (in Polish). Ex Libris.

== See also ==
- Polish Cathedral style churches of Chicago
- Polish Americans
- Poles in Chicago
- Roman Catholicism in Poland
