= Ludźmierz =

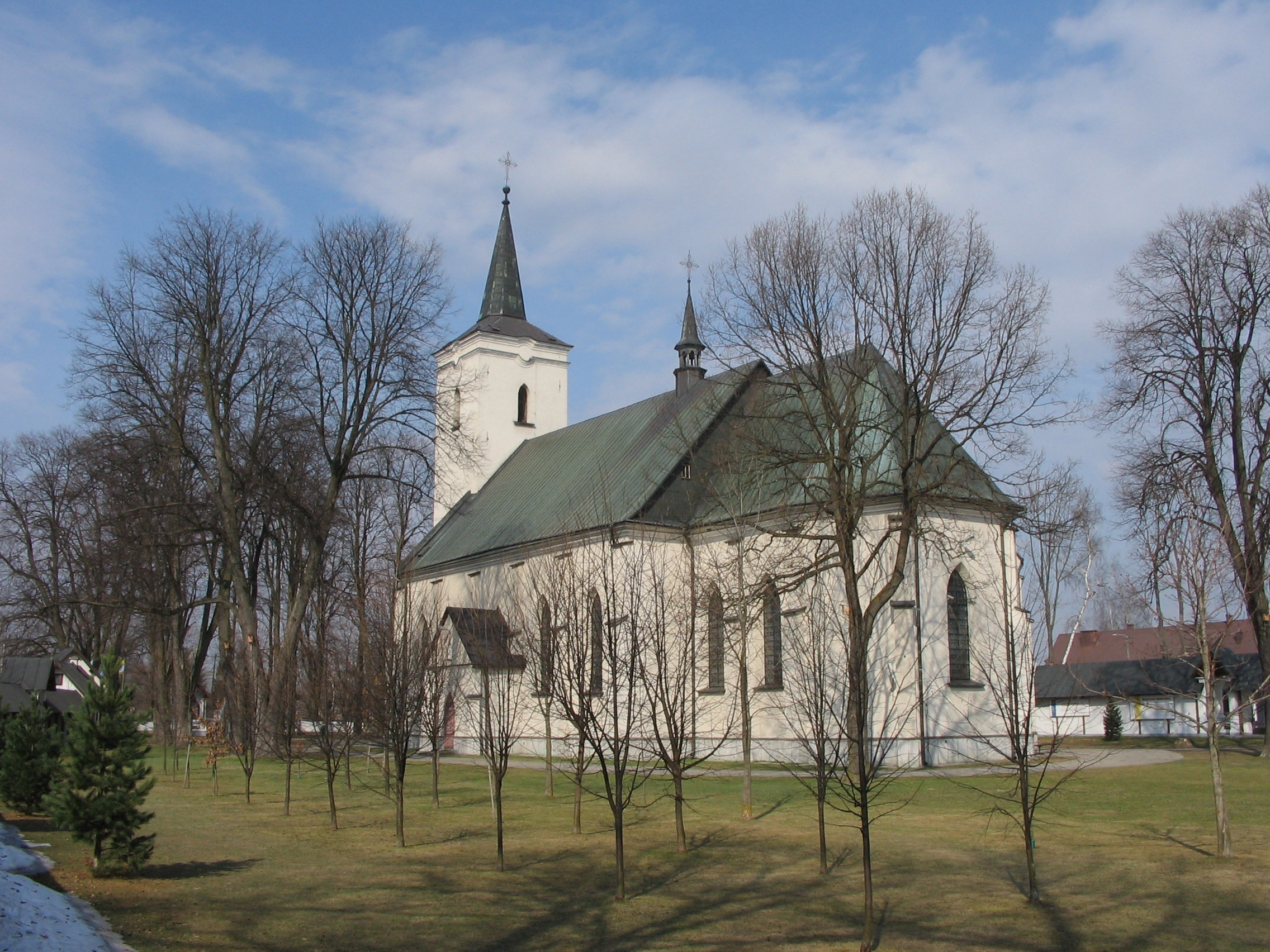
- Catholic church in Ludźmierz

- Location within Poland
- Coordinates: 49°28′10″N 19°58′44″E
- Country: Poland
- Voivodeship: Lesser Poland
- County: Nowy Targ
- Gmina: Nowy Targ

Population (2006)
  - Total: 2,100
- Time zone: UTC+1 (CET)
  - Summer (DST): UTC+2 (CEST)
- Postal code: 34-471
- Area code: +48 18
- Car plates: KNT

Ludźmierz [ˈlud͡ʑmjɛʂ] is a village in Poland in the Lesser Poland voivodeship, in the county of Nowy Targ.

The building of the church which the village is famous for was begun in 1234 and completed by 1238. It was run by the Cistercians who were custodians of the site until 1824.

Ludźmierz is the birthplace of Kazimierz Przerwa-Tetmajer.

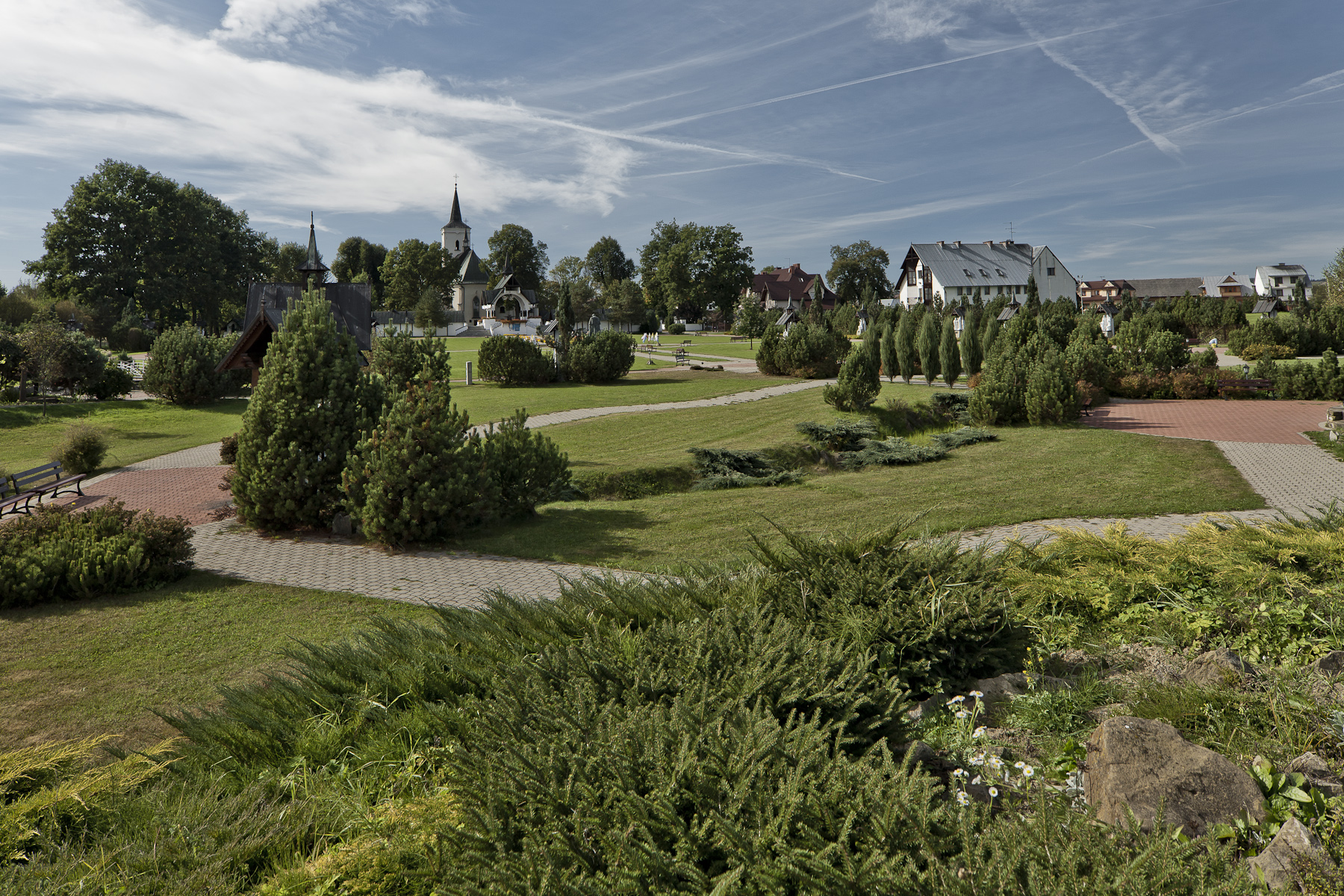
View of the monastic gardens in Ludźmierz

== Marian Sanctuary ==
The settlement is the site of the Marian Sanctuary in Ludźmierz, which was declared a Minor Basilica May 18, 2001. On June 7, 1997, Ludźmierz hosted Pope John Paul II, where he said the rosary in the sanctuary's Rosary Garden.
