= Sanctuary of Our Lady of Ludźmierz =

Church in Lesser Poland Voivodeship, Poland

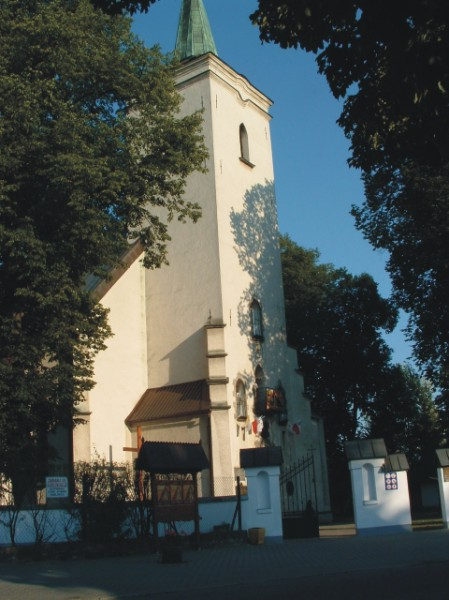
The church housing Our Lady of Ludźmierz

The Sanctuary of Our Lady of Ludźmierz in Ludźmierz, Poland is home to Our Lady of Ludźmierz, known as the Shepherdess of Podhale or in Polish Gaździna Podhala. The cult of Our Lady of Ludźmierz is strongly identified with the Góral people who live in the surrounding Tatra Mountains.

== History ==
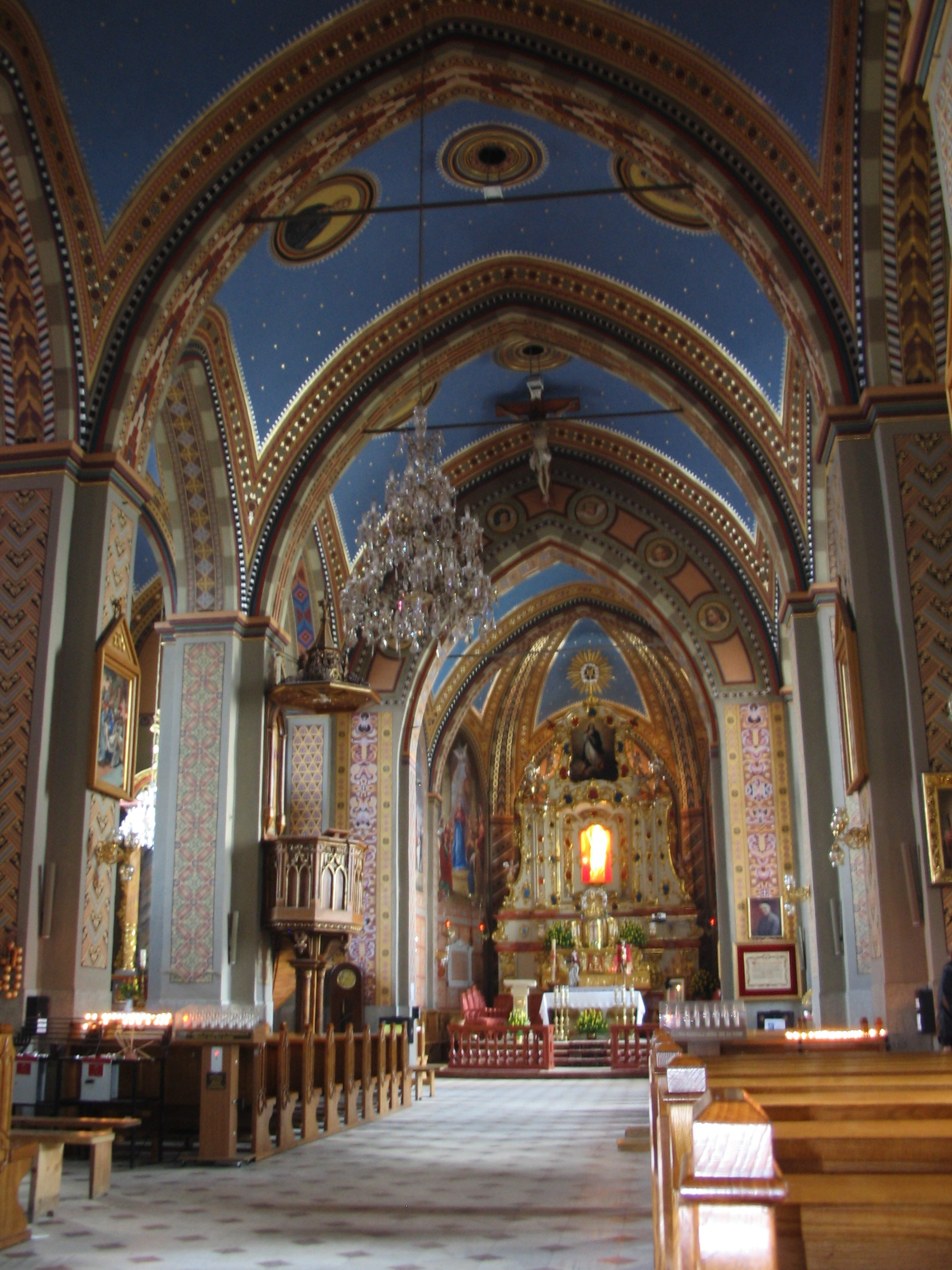
The interior of the church

Ludźmierz is the oldest Catholic parish in Podhale. Its history stretches back to the 13th century. In 1234 Teodor Gryfita began raising a simple wooden church with a shingled roof and three altars in Ludźmierz, after obtaining permission from the bishop of Kraków. To encourage settlement in the uninhabited area, Gryfita brought in Cistercian Monks from France, Italy and nearby Jędrzejów.

A simple wooden monastery was built soon after, along with a number of other buildings used in agriculture. These buildings which burnt down in 1796, had been practically abandoned since 1245 due to the high frequency of raids by bands of Tatars and thieves and the monks moved to nearby Szczyrzyc. However the Cistercians ministered to the parish in Ludźmierz until 1824, when it came under the care of Diocesan priests.

In 1869-77 the old wooden church was dismantled, and in its place the current Neo-Gothic edifice was raised, and the Rococo altar with the figurine of Our Lady of Ludźmierz was moved into the new church. Pope John Paul II visited the sanctuary in 1997. In 2001 the church was declared a Minor Basilica.

The basilica has a 26-voice organ, which was brought from the 12th-century church of St. John in Oldenburg in Holstein. They replaced a 15-voice instrument by Tomasz Fall from 1892, unused since 2017.

== Papal prophecy ==
Perhaps the most well-known story regarding the shrine is an incident during the Canonical Coronation of the statue by Cardinal Stefan Wyszyński on 15 August 1963, attended by the future Pope John Paul II as Bishop of the Archdiocese of Kraków. The statue accidentally slipped during the ceremony and the future pontiff caught the scepter which had fallen out of the statue's grasp, a scene that was later interpreted as a prophecy of the young bishop's future selection as Pope.

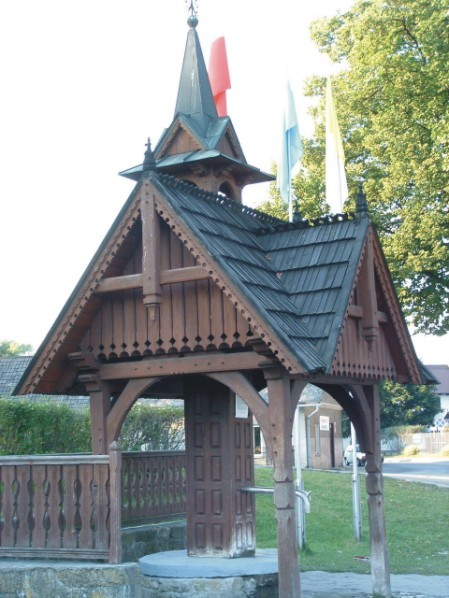
"Miraculous Spring"

== Statue of Our Lady of Ludźmierz ==
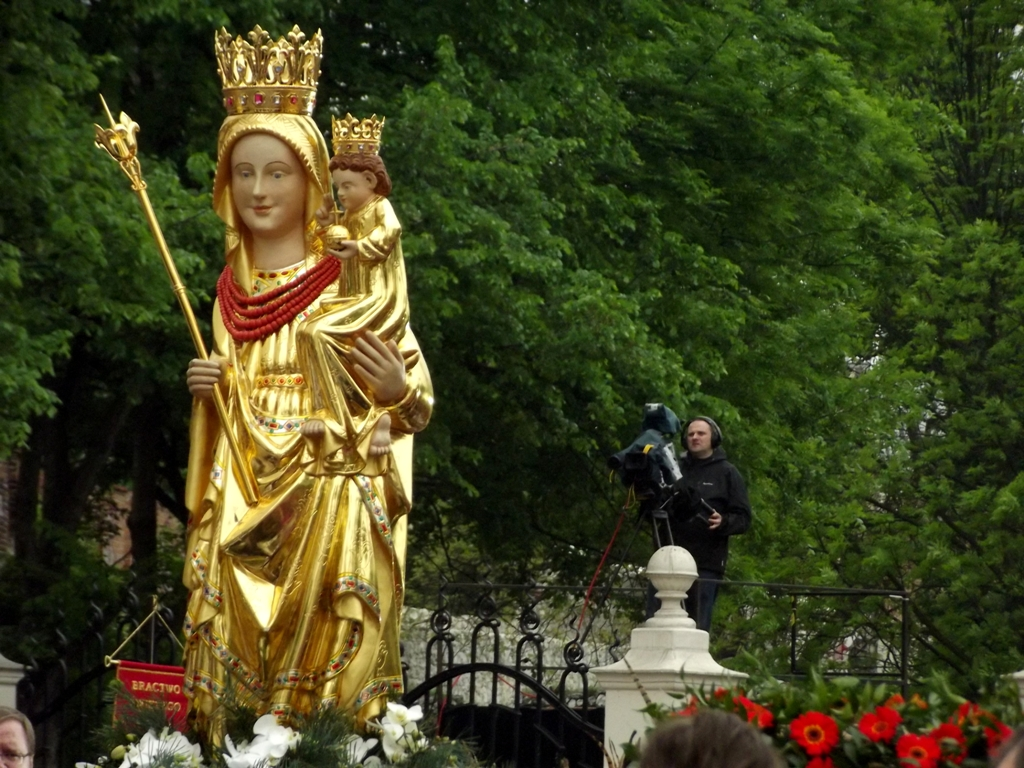

The figurine of Our Lady of Ludźmierz, which has drawn throngs of pilgrims since the Middle Ages was originally placed in one of the church's side altars, and it wasn't until 1776 that the statue made its way into the main altar. The statue of Our Lady of Ludźmierz is thought to be about 600 years old. The wooden statue itself is about 125 cm in height, and a replica is situated next to the "miraculous spring" next to the sanctuary.

Multiple copies of the figure have spread all over the world, from the Pfarrkirche of St. Johannes Baptist in Baindt to the church of St. Mary of Częstochowa in Cicero. Most of the spread in devotion to Our Lady of Ludźmierz can be traced back to the outmigration of the Góral community out of their native Carpathian homeland.

== Medieval legend ==
There is a medieval legend from about 1400 that refers to the Shepherdess of Podhale or the Gaździna Podhala which refers to a Hungarian merchant on his way to Nowy Targ who after having lost his way in the nearby swamps, was miraculously led out by a mysterious lady to the church. When he understood that this mysterious figure had been Mary, the mother of Jesus, he attempted to kneel to give thanks in prayer when a miraculous spring burst forth. He pledged to commission a statue that would depict Mary as he'd seen her and bring it back to the church
