= Kazimierz Przerwa-Tetmajer =

Polish writer (1865–1940)

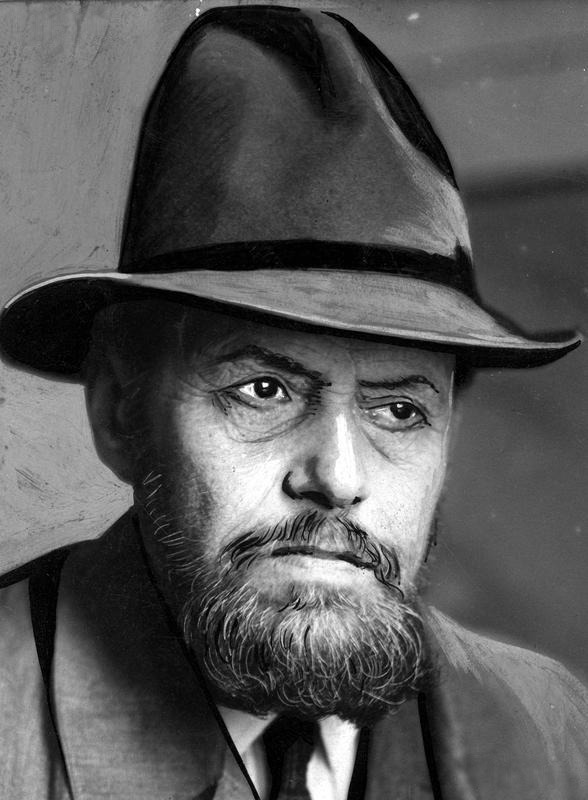
- Born: 12 February 1865; Ludźmierz
- Died: 18 January 1940 (aged 74); Warsaw
- Writing career
- Language: Polish Goralic
- Genre: Romanticism
- Movement: Young Poland

Kazimierz Przerwa-Tetmajer (12 February 1865 – 18 January 1940) was a Polish Goral poet, novelist, playwright, journalist and writer. He was a member of the Young Poland movement.

== Life ==
Kazimierz Przerwa-Tetmajer was born in Ludźmierz in Podhale near the Tatra Mountains, then in the Austro-Hungarian Empire now in Poland, and died in Warsaw. His older half-brother was the painter Włodzimierz Tetmajer. Przerwa-Tetmajer studied classics and philosophy at the Jagiellonian University in 1884–1889. He then became a journalist at Kurier Polski, and lived both in the Tatras and in Kraków (Cracow). After World War I he moved to Warsaw to serve as president of the Society of Writers and Journalists. In 1934 he was made honorary member of the Polish Academy of Literature.

Przerwa-Tetmajer suffered from mental illness in the latter years of his life, which prevented him from writing. He was a permanent resident of the Hotel Europejski in 1940 when the German occupiers took over the building. He was left homeless and died shortly afterwards in a Warsaw hospital.

== Work ==
Przerwa-Tetmajer wrote seven collections of poetry before World War I. He is particularly well known for his works about the Tatra Mountains. At least one of his poems, Kriváň, High Kriváň! (Krywaniu, Krywaniu wysoki!) is now often taken for an authentic folk song and was credited as such on a similarly named 1972 folk-rock album by Skaldowie. According to Barry Keane from The Warsaw Voice:

Przerwa Tetmajer was primarily a lyrical poet who articulated the birth pangs of modernism at the turn of the century, but he will be best remembered for his erotic verse and for poems evoking his beloved Tatra mountains. He broke with age-old subtleties and niceties common to amorous poetry and wrote on love in frank and provocative terms. The poet simultaneously attracted huge praise from legions of readers and loud accusations of depravity from other quarters... at the close of the 19th century.

His work was also part of the literature event in the art competition at the 1928 Summer Olympics.

== See also ==
- Polish literature
- List of Polish writers

== See also ==
- About K. Przerwa-Tetmajer in Encyclopædia Britannica
- Sample poem: "A Cradle Wind", translated by Walter Whipple
- Polish literature
- Young Poland
