= Grand Hotel (New York City) =

- U.S. National Register of Historic Places
- New York State Register of Historic Places
- New York City Landmark
- The Grand Hotel in 2026

- Location within Manhattan Location within New York City
- Location: 1232–1238 Broadway; Manhattan, New York City
- Coordinates: 40°44′50″N 73°59′17″W
- Built: 1868
- Architect: Henry Engelbert
- Architectural style: Second Empire
- NRHP reference No.: 83001725
- NYSRHP No.: 06101.001699
- NYCL No.: 1041

Significant dates
- Added to NRHP: September 15, 1983
- Designated NYSRHP: August 11, 1983
- Designated NYCL: September 11, 1979

The Grand Hotel is located at 1232–1238 Broadway at the corner of West 31st Street in the NoMad neighborhood of Manhattan, New York City.

== History ==
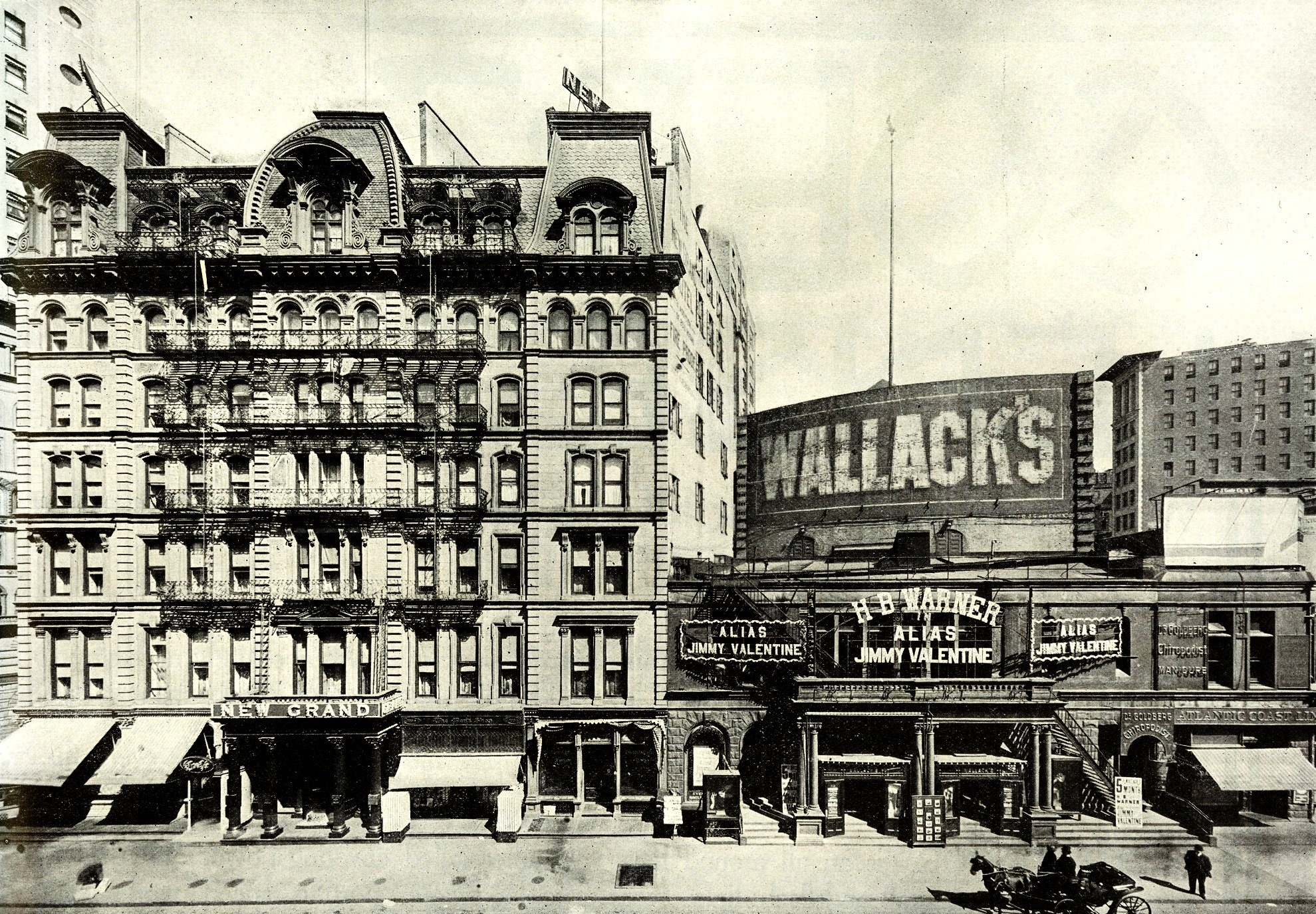
The hotel (left) in 1910. At right is Wallack's Theatre

It was built in 1868 and was designed by Henry Engelbert in the Second Empire style. Englebert designed the hotel for Elias S. Higgins, a prosperous carpet manufacturer and merchant.

At the time the Grand Hotel was built, the area of Broadway between Madison Square and Herald Square was the premier entertainment district in the city, teeming with theatres, restaurants and hotels. The sleazier establishments on the side streets soon gave the district a new name, the "Tenderloin". When the theatre district moved uptown again, the area became part of the Garment District, and the Grand Hotel became a cut-rate residential hotel.

Oscar Wilde is known to have stayed at the hotel at least twice during 1882.

The building was designated a New York City Landmark in 1979, and was added to the National Register of Historic Places in 1983.

== See also ==
- National Register of Historic Places listings in Manhattan from 14th to 59th Streets
- List of former hotels in Manhattan
- List of New York City Designated Landmarks in Manhattan from 14th to 59th Streets
