= St. Mary of Perpetual Help Church (Chicago) =

Coordinates: 41°50′9.4″N 87°39′9.1″W

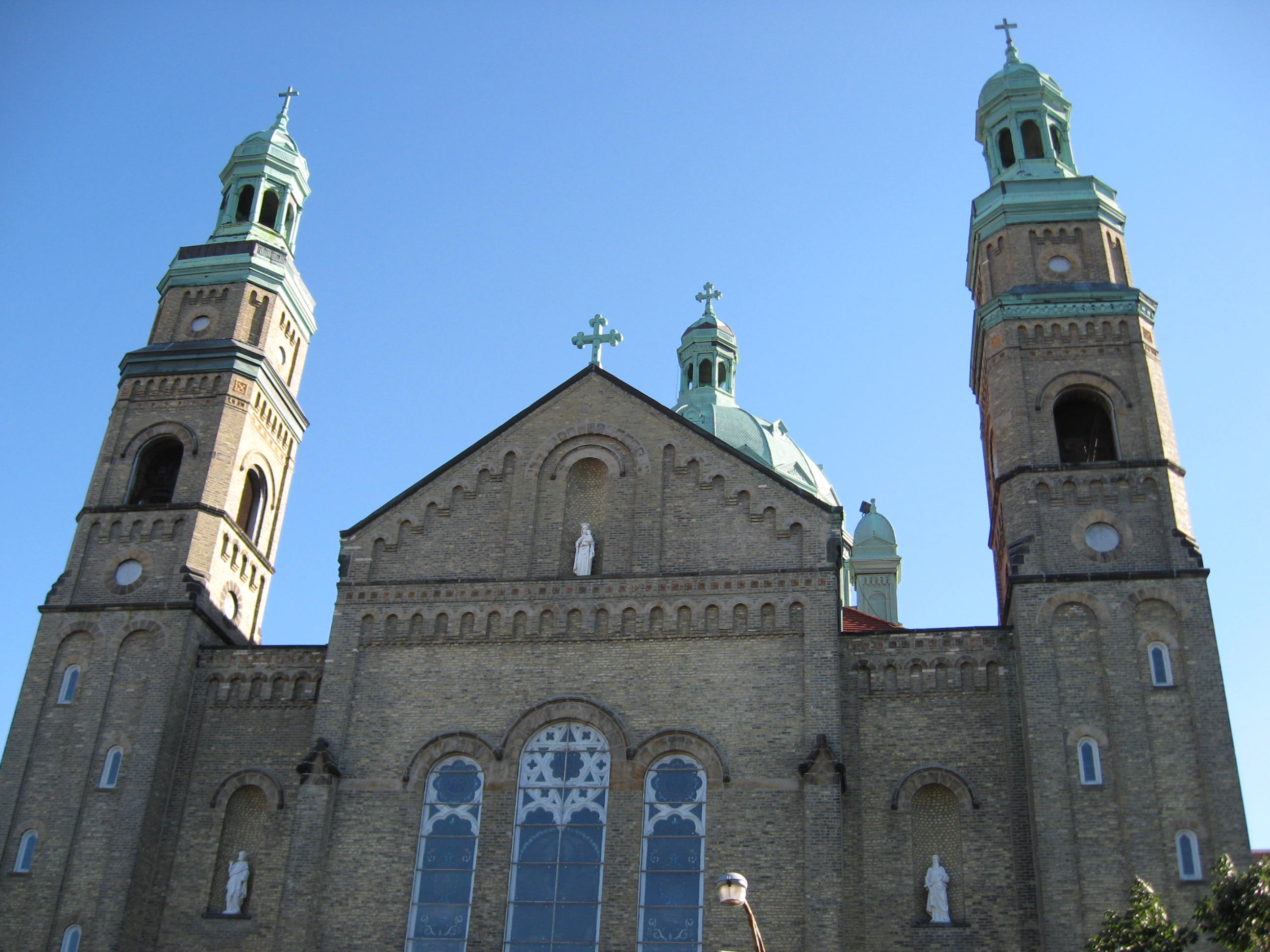

- Location: 1039 West 32nd Street; Chicago, Illinois
- Country: United States
- Denomination: Roman Catholic
- Website: St. Mary of Perpetual Help Parish

History
- Founded: 1882
- Founder: Polish immigrants
- Dedication: Our Lady of Perpetual Help
- Dedicated: August 16, 1885

Architecture
- Functional status: Active
- Heritage designation: For Polish immigrants
- Architect: Henry Engelbert
- Architectural type: Church
- Style: Romanesque Revival
- Groundbreaking: 1883

Specifications
- Materials: Brick

St. Mary of Perpetual Help (Polish: Kościół Matki Bożej Nieustającej Pomocy) - historic church of the Roman Catholic Archdiocese of Chicago located in the Bridgeport neighborhood of Chicago, Illinois.

It is a prime example of the so-called Polish Cathedral style of churches in both its opulence and grand scale. Along with St. Barbara's in Chicago, it is one of two monumental religious edifices found in this near South Side neighborhood.

== History ==
Founded in 1882 as a Polish parish, it remained a parish for Polish workers in the Union Stockyards until the yards closed in the early 1970s. In recent years the neighborhood has seen a growth in new housing and has seen an influx of new residents of many backgrounds and cultures.

St. Mary of Perpetual Help was built from the same or a similar plan as St. Casimir Church in Detroit in 1889, which was razed in 1961.

== Architecture ==
The church designed by Henry Engelbert in a Romanesque-Byzantine style, was completed in 1889. The brick exterior hides a lavishly shaped and opulently decorated interior enriched with Stations of the Cross and stained glass windows with Polish inscriptions. Three domes sail above, the central dome lit by a ring of lantern windows and towering 137 feet (42 m) over the neighborhood. Since 1999, the church has undergone extensive restoration of the original structure, the interior decoration by John A. Mallin in 1961 and the 1928 Austin organ, Opus 1602. The historic paintings in the Shrine Altars which date to 1890, were recently restored by the Art Institute of Chicago. The Joyful Mysteries are depicted in the "Shrine of our Blessed Mother", while the "Shrine of St. Joseph" holds paintings of the Holy Family, the Flight into Egypt and the Marriage of Joseph and Mary. The nave is decorated with fine scaliola work and a suspended pulpit is topped by a wedding cake cupola. A new mosaic of Our Lady of Perpetual Help by the Soprani Studios of Rome was recently installed, as well as the contents of a time capsule of precious historical documents.

== See also ==
- Tadeusz Żukotyński
- Sr. Maria Stanisia
- Jozef Mazur
- Polish Cathedral style
- Poles in Chicago
- Polish Roman Catholic Union of America
