= Czarny Dunajec (river) =

River in Poland

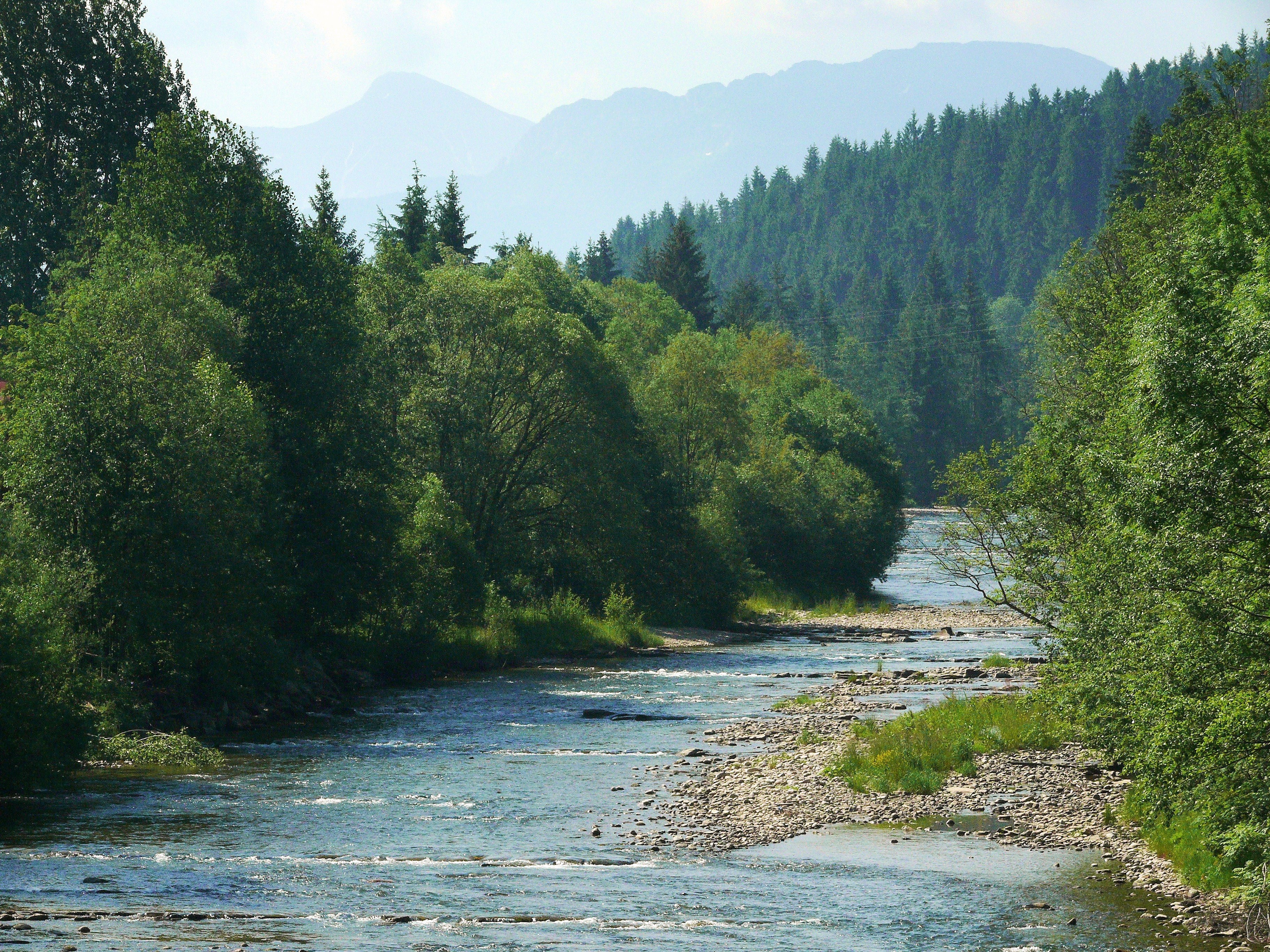
- Czarny Dunajec near Chochołów

Physical characteristics
- Source
  - location: Roztoki in Witów
  - coordinates: 49°17′29″N 19°51′02″E
  - elevation: 579 m (1,900 ft)
- Mouth: Dunajec
  - location: Nowy Targ
  - coordinates: 49°29′04″N 20°02′35″E
- Length: 48 km (30 mi)
- Basin size: 456 km^{2} (176 sq mi)

Basin features
- Progression: Dunajec→ Vistula→ Baltic Sea

The Czarny Dunajec is a river in southern Poland (Lesser Poland Voivodeship), in the Vistula basin.

== Course ==
The Wyżni Chochołowski Potok is considered the source of the Czarny Dunajec river. It flows out at an altitude of about 1,500 metres (4,900 ft) under Volovec in the Western Tatras. After the merger with the Jarząbcze Potok, the Chochołowski Potok is formed, called Siwa Woda in the lower part. It is the middle course of Czarny Dunajec. In Roztoki (part of the village of Witów), Siwa Woda connects with Kirowa Woda and the lower course of the Czarny Dunajec begins here.

The Czarny Dunajec flows through Podhale, initially to the north-west, between Pogórze Gubałowskie and Orawicko-Witowskie Wierchy, then north through the Orava-Nowy Targ Basin. It makes a wide arc and flows to the east. The main towns that the Czarny Dunajec flows through include Witów, Chochołów, Koniówka, Podczerwone, Czarny Dunajec, Wróblówka, Długopole, Krauszów and Ludźmierz. In Nowy Targ it joins the Biały Dunajec river, creating the Dunajec.

== Tributaries ==
Larger tributaries in the sequence of the river:

- left: Przybylanka, Magurski Potok, Greków Potok, Garczków Potok, Chrobaków Potok, Domagalski Potok, Siców Potok, Piekielnik, Lepietnica, Potoczek, Klikuszówka, Skotnica, Kowaniec
- right: Kirowa Woda, Antałowski Potok, Wielki Głęboki Potok, Szymonów Potok, Bobków Potok, Mały Głęboki Potok, Iwański Potok, Gawronów Potok, Dzianiski Potok, Zagrodzianka, Młynówka, Czarny Potok, Czerwony Potok, Wielki Rogoźnik

The width of the river ranges from 3 to 15 metres (9.8 to 49.2 ft). The water depth is variable; from shallows to plunge pools up to 3 metres (9.8 ft) deep. In its upper part (down to the village of Czarny Dunajec), the Czarny Dunajec has the character of a mountain river; there are numerous weirs in its bed in this section. Downstream, in the Orava-Nowy Targ Basin, the river slows down and behaves like lowland rivers; it produces bends and side branches.

Fly fishing is allowed along the entire length of the river, but only outside the buffer zone of the Tatra National Park (below the mouth of the Iwański Potok). The Czarny Dunajec mainly contains brown trout, less common grayling and chub.

== See also ==
- List of rivers of Poland
