= Chochołów Uprising =

1846 Polish rebellion against the Austrian Empire

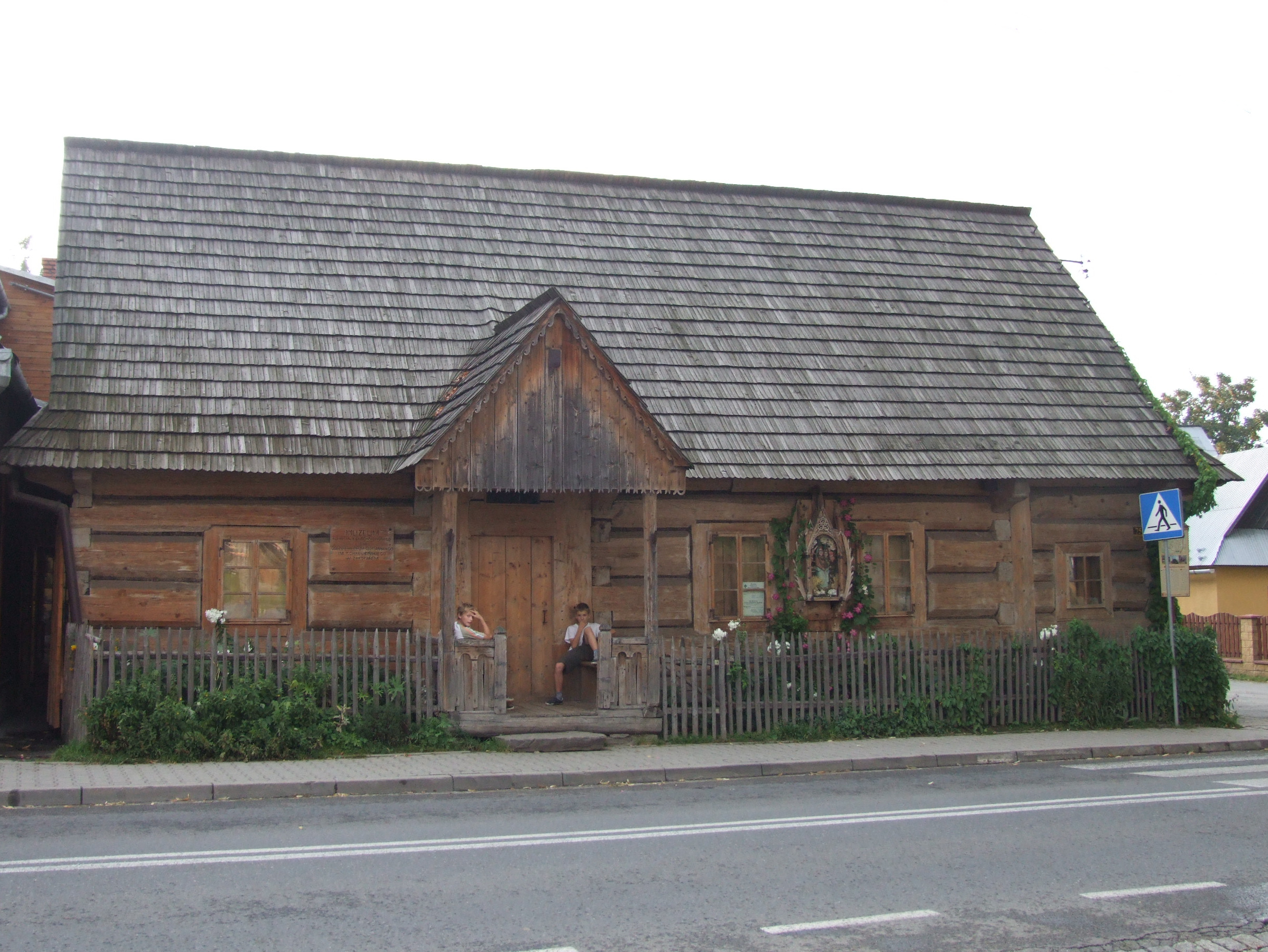
- Chochołów Uprising Museum
Date	21–23 February 1846
Location	Podhale, Galicia, Austrian Partition of Poland
Result	Austrian victory

Belligerents
Gorals of Chochołów, Ciche, Dzianisz, and Witów	Austrian Empire Supported by: Gorals of Czarny Dunajec

Commanders and leaders
Jan Andrusikiewicz; Józef Kmietowicz; Michał Głowacki	Romuald Fiutowski

Strength
over 500	Unknown

Casualties and losses
about 150 captured	Unknown

The Chochołów Uprising, also known as the Tatra Insurrection (Polish: powstanie chochołowskie or insurekcja pod Tatrami; German: Chochołów-Aufstand; Goral: poruseństwo chochołowskie) was a rebellion of rural Gorals of the region of Podhale (present-day southern Poland) in the Kingdom of Galicia and Lodomeria against the Austrian authorities, in February 1846.

== Background ==
The rebellion was organized by local teacher Jan Kanty Andrusikiewicz, poet Julian Goslar, as well as priests Józef Leopold Kmietowicz, Michał Głowacki, and Michał Janiczak. It was initiated by the Polish Democratic Society as a part of the planned general uprising in partitioned Poland. The message that the general uprising was called off did not reach the people of Chochołów.

== Uprising ==
On 21 February 1846, the same day that the Kraków Uprising started, a group of Gorals from the villages of Chochołów, Ciche, Dzianisz, and Witów, led by Andrusikiewicz and a November Uprising veteran Wojciech Lebiocki, attacked a tax guards' post in Chochołów. Next, they attacked a tax guard station in Sucha Góra (now Suchá Hora, Slovakia). The rebels confiscated the guards' weapons and 600 guilders, knocked down a symbol of the Imperial Eagle from the building's wall, and destroyed a border post. Their next goals were a guards' post in Witów and forestry departments in Witów and Kościelisko. On 22 February, priest Kmietowicz called for more Gorals to join the rebellion. About 500 people joined. The insurgents' goal was to reach Nowy Targ and join forces with other units in the area of Myślenice to aid the Kraków Uprising.

Austrian soldiers convinced the people of nearby Czarny Dunajec that the insurgents were planning to attack the town. On the night of 22–23 February, a group of about 20 border guards and 150 peasants from Czarny Dunajec, led by commissioner Romuald Fiutowski, attacked the Chochołów rebels. The insurgents managed to repel the attack. On February 23, a new group of guards, along with Czarny Dunajec peasants, arrived in Chochołów, forcing the Gorals to surrender.

== Aftermath ==
About 150 of the insurgents, including Kmietowicz and Andrusikiewicz, were arrested and imprisoned. Charged with treason, they either received long prison sentences or were sentenced to capital punishment. They were let go from prisons in 1848, during the Springtime of Nations.

Emperor of Austria awarded the residents of Czarny Dunajec a decree of recognition for their loyalty to the monarchy. The statue of John of Nepomuk in Chochołów was said to have been placed with its back facing Czarny Dunajec as a sign of the local population's anger towards the people of the town.

== Legacy ==
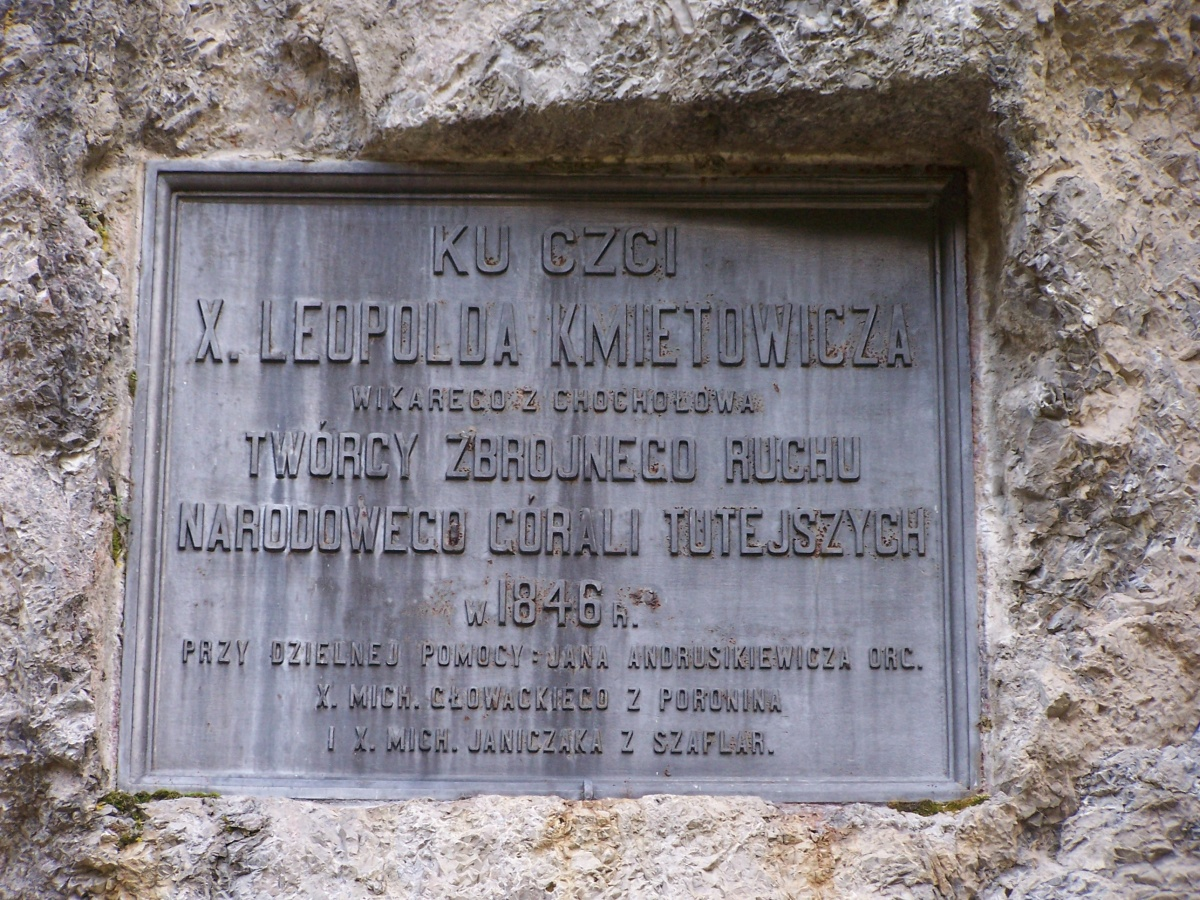
Commemorative plaque to priest Kmietowicz and the Chochołów Uprising

The Chochołów Uprising is commemorated within the area. Reconstructions and performances are held on the anniversaries of the uprising. Several institutions, such as a school, a museum, and a tourist trail, were given the name of the Chochołów Insurgents.
