= 2021 Tour de Pologne =

78th Tour de Pologne road cycling race

2021 UCI World Tour, race 23 of 29

Race details
- Dates: 9–15 August 2021
- Stages: 7
- Distance: 1,140 km (710 mi)
- Winning time: 26h 15' 56"

Results
Jersey awarded to the overall winner	Winner	João Almeida (POR)	(Deceuninck–Quick-Step)
	Second	Matej Mohorič (SLO)	(Team Bahrain Victorious)
	Third	Michał Kwiatkowski (POL)	(INEOS Grenadiers)
Jersey awarded to the mountains classification winner	Mountains	Łukasz Owsian (POL)	(Poland)
Jersey awarded to the sprints classification winner	Sprints	João Almeida (POR)	(Deceuninck–Quick-Step)
Jersey awarded to the combativity classification winner	Combativity	Taco van der Hoorn (NED)	(Intermarché–Wanty–Gobert Matériaux)
	Team	Deceuninck–Quick-Step	

The 2021 Tour de Pologne was the 78th running of the Tour de Pologne road cycling stage race, which was part of the 2021 UCI World Tour. It started on 9 August in Lublin, and ended on 15 August in Kraków.

== Teams ==
All nineteen UCI WorldTeams, two wildcard UCI ProTeams, and the Polish national team made up the twenty-two teams that participated in the race. Cofidis, with five riders, and Trek–Segafredo, with six riders, were the only teams not to enter a full squad of seven riders. Of the 151 riders who started the race, 140 finished.

UCI WorldTeams

- AG2R Citroën Team
- Astana–Premier Tech
- Bora–Hansgrohe
- Cofidis
- Deceuninck–Quick-Step
- EF Education–Nippo
- Groupama–FDJ
- INEOS Grenadiers
- Intermarché–Wanty–Gobert Matériaux
- Israel Start-Up Nation
- Lotto–Soudal
- Movistar Team
- Team Bahrain Victorious
- Team BikeExchange
- Team DSM
- Team Jumbo–Visma
- Team Qhubeka NextHash
- Trek–Segafredo
- UAE Team Emirates

UCI ProTeams

- Alpecin–Fenix
- Gazprom–RusVelo

National Teams

- Poland

== Schedule ==
Stage characteristics and winners
Stage	Date	Course	Distance	Type	Stage winner
1	9 August	Lublin to Chełm	216.4 km (134.5 mi)	Flat stage	Phil Bauhaus (GER)
2	10 August	Zamość to Przemyśl	200.8 km (124.8 mi)	Hilly stage	João Almeida (POR)
3	11 August	Sanok to Rzeszów	226.4 km (140.7 mi)	Hilly stage	Fernando Gaviria (COL)
4	12 August	Tarnów to Bukovina Resort	160.5 km (99.7 mi)	Mountain stage	João Almeida (POR)
5	13 August	Chochołów / Gmina Czarny Dunajec to Bielsko-Biała	172.9 km (107.4 mi)	Medium-mountain stage	Nikias Arndt (GER)
6	14 August	Katowice to Katowice	17.9 km (11.1 mi)	Individual time trial	Rémi Cavagna (FRA)
7	15 August	Zabrze to Kraków	145.1 km (90.2 mi)	Flat stage	Julius van den Berg (NED)
Total			1,140 km (710 mi)		

== Stages ==
=== Stage 1 ===
9 August 2021 – Lublin to Chełm, 216.4 km (134.5 mi)

Stage 1 Result
Rank	Rider	Team	Time
1	Phil Bauhaus (GER)	Team Bahrain Victorious	5h 01' 24"
2	Álvaro Hodeg (COL)	Deceuninck–Quick-Step	+ 0"
3	Hugo Hofstetter (FRA)	Israel Start-Up Nation	+ 0"
4	Edward Theuns (BEL)	Trek–Segafredo	+ 0"
5	David Dekker (NED)	Team Jumbo–Visma	+ 0"
6	Dion Smith (NZL)	Team BikeExchange	+ 0"
7	Jonas Rickaert (BEL)	Alpecin–Fenix	+ 0"
8	Biniam Girmay (ERI)	Intermarché–Wanty–Gobert Matériaux	+ 0"
9	Matej Mohorič (SLO)	Team Bahrain Victorious	+ 0"
10	Michał Kwiatkowski (POL)	INEOS Grenadiers	+ 0"

General classification after Stage 1
Rank	Rider	Team	Time
1	Phil Bauhaus (GER)	Team Bahrain Victorious	5h 01' 14"
2	Álvaro Hodeg (COL)	Deceuninck–Quick-Step	+ 4"
3	Yevgeniy Fedorov (KAZ)	Astana–Premier Tech	+ 4"
4	Hugo Hofstetter (FRA)	Israel Start-Up Nation	+ 6"
5	Michał Kwiatkowski (POL)	INEOS Grenadiers	+ 7"
6	Matej Mohorič (SLO)	Team Bahrain Victorious	+ 8"
7	Emīls Liepiņš (LAT)	Trek–Segafredo	+ 9"
8	Edward Theuns (BEL)	Trek–Segafredo	+ 10"
9	David Dekker (NED)	Team Jumbo–Visma	+ 10"
10	Dion Smith (NZL)	Team BikeExchange	+ 10"

=== Stage 2 ===
10 August 2021 – Zamość to Przemyśl, 200.8 km (124.8 mi)

Stage 2 Result
Rank	Rider	Team	Time
1	João Almeida (POR)	Deceuninck–Quick-Step	4h 41' 33"
2	Diego Ulissi (ITA)	UAE Team Emirates	+ 0"
3	Matej Mohorič (SLO)	Team Bahrain Victorious	+ 0"
4	Michał Kwiatkowski (POL)	INEOS Grenadiers	+ 4"
5	Mikkel Frølich Honoré (DEN)	Deceuninck–Quick-Step	+ 8"
6	Lorenzo Rota (ITA)	Intermarché–Wanty–Gobert Matériaux	+ 12"
7	Jai Hindley (AUS)	Team DSM	+ 12"
8	Giovanni Aleotti (ITA)	Bora–Hansgrohe	+ 12"
9	Dylan Teuns (BEL)	Team Bahrain Victorious	+ 12"
10	Tim Wellens (BEL)	Lotto–Soudal	+ 16"

General classification after Stage 2
Rank	Rider	Team	Time
1	João Almeida (POR)	Deceuninck–Quick-Step	9h 42' 47"
2	Matej Mohorič (SLO)	Team Bahrain Victorious	+ 4"
3	Diego Ulissi (ITA)	UAE Team Emirates	+ 4"
4	Michał Kwiatkowski (POL)	INEOS Grenadiers	+ 11"
5	Mikkel Frølich Honoré (DEN)	Deceuninck–Quick-Step	+ 18"
6	Dylan Teuns (BEL)	Team Bahrain Victorious	+ 22"
7	Lorenzo Rota (ITA)	Intermarché–Wanty–Gobert Matériaux	+ 22"
8	Jai Hindley (AUS)	Team DSM	+ 22"
9	Giovanni Aleotti (ITA)	Bora–Hansgrohe	+ 22"
10	Tim Wellens (BEL)	Lotto–Soudal	+ 26"

=== Stage 3 ===
11 August 2021 – Sanok to Rzeszów, 226.4 km (140.7 mi)

Stage 3 Result
Rank	Rider	Team	Time
1	Fernando Gaviria (COL)	UAE Team Emirates	5h 18' 15"
2	Olav Kooij (NED)	Team Jumbo–Visma	+ 0"
3	Phil Bauhaus (GER)	Team Bahrain Victorious	+ 0"
4	Max Kanter (GER)	Team DSM	+ 0"
5	Max Walscheid (GER)	Team Qhubeka NextHash	+ 0"
6	Jonas Rickaert (BEL)	Alpecin–Fenix	+ 0"
7	Hugo Hofstetter (FRA)	Israel Start-Up Nation	+ 0"
8	Michael Schwarzmann (GER)	Bora–Hansgrohe	+ 0"
9	Michał Kwiatkowski (POL)	INEOS Grenadiers	+ 0"
10	John Degenkolb (GER)	Lotto–Soudal	+ 0"

General classification after Stage 3
Rank	Rider	Team	Time
1	João Almeida (POR)	Deceuninck–Quick-Step	15h 01' 02"
2	Diego Ulissi (ITA)	UAE Team Emirates	+ 4"
3	Matej Mohorič (SLO)	Team Bahrain Victorious	+ 4"
4	Michał Kwiatkowski (POL)	INEOS Grenadiers	+ 11"
5	Mikkel Frølich Honoré (DEN)	Deceuninck–Quick-Step	+ 18"
6	Dylan Teuns (BEL)	Team Bahrain Victorious	+ 22"
7	Lorenzo Rota (ITA)	Intermarché–Wanty–Gobert Matériaux	+ 22"
8	Jai Hindley (AUS)	Team DSM	+ 22"
9	Giovanni Aleotti (ITA)	Bora–Hansgrohe	+ 22"
10	Einer Rubio (COL)	Movistar Team	+ 26"

=== Stage 4 ===
12 August 2021 – Tarnów to Bukovina Resort, 160.5 km (99.7 mi)

Stage 4 Result
Rank	Rider	Team	Time
1	João Almeida (POR)	Deceuninck–Quick-Step	3h 51' 32"
2	Matej Mohorič (SLO)	Team Bahrain Victorious	+ 0"
3	Andrea Vendrame (ITA)	AG2R Citroën Team	+ 0"
4	Michał Kwiatkowski (POL)	INEOS Grenadiers	+ 0"
5	Dion Smith (NZL)	Team BikeExchange	+ 0"
6	Jai Hindley (AUS)	Team DSM	+ 0"
7	Ben Tulett (GBR)	Alpecin–Fenix	+ 0"
8	Diego Ulissi (ITA)	UAE Team Emirates	+ 0"
9	Antonio Tiberi (ITA)	Trek–Segafredo	+ 0"
10	Quinten Hermans (BEL)	Intermarché–Wanty–Gobert Matériaux	+ 0"

General classification after Stage 4
Rank	Rider	Team	Time
1	João Almeida (POR)	Deceuninck–Quick-Step	18h 52' 24"
2	Matej Mohorič (SLO)	Team Bahrain Victorious	+ 8"
3	Diego Ulissi (ITA)	UAE Team Emirates	+ 14"
4	Michał Kwiatkowski (POL)	INEOS Grenadiers	+ 21"
5	Jai Hindley (AUS)	Team DSM	+ 32"
6	Dylan Teuns (BEL)	Team Bahrain Victorious	+ 32"
7	Lorenzo Rota (ITA)	Intermarché–Wanty–Gobert Matériaux	+ 32"
8	Giovanni Aleotti (ITA)	Bora–Hansgrohe	+ 32"
9	Einer Rubio (COL)	Movistar Team	+ 36"
10	Tim Wellens (BEL)	Lotto–Soudal	+ 36"

=== Stage 5 ===
13 August 2021 – Chochołów / Gmina Czarny Dunajec to Bielsko-Biała, 172.9 km (107.4 mi)

Stage 5 Result
Rank	Rider	Team	Time
1	Nikias Arndt (GER)	Team DSM	4h 02' 20"
2	Matej Mohorič (SLO)	Team Bahrain Victorious	+ 0"
3	Stefano Oldani (ITA)	Lotto–Soudal	+ 0"
4	João Almeida (POR)	Deceuninck–Quick-Step	+ 0"
5	Diego Ulissi (ITA)	UAE Team Emirates	+ 0"
6	Quinten Hermans (BEL)	Intermarché–Wanty–Gobert Matériaux	+ 0"
7	David Dekker (NED)	Team Jumbo–Visma	+ 0"
8	Jake Stewart (GBR)	Groupama–FDJ	+ 0"
9	Andrea Vendrame (ITA)	AG2R Citroën Team	+ 0"
10	Mikkel Frølich Honoré (DEN)	Deceuninck–Quick-Step	+ 0"

General classification after Stage 5
Rank	Rider	Team	Time
1	João Almeida (POR)	Deceuninck–Quick-Step	22h 54' 44"
2	Matej Mohorič (SLO)	Team Bahrain Victorious	+ 2"
3	Diego Ulissi (ITA)	UAE Team Emirates	+ 14"
4	Michał Kwiatkowski (POL)	INEOS Grenadiers	+ 21"
5	Lorenzo Rota (ITA)	Intermarché–Wanty–Gobert Matériaux	+ 32"
6	Jai Hindley (AUS)	Team DSM	+ 32"
7	Giovanni Aleotti (ITA)	Bora–Hansgrohe	+ 32"
8	Dylan Teuns (BEL)	Team Bahrain Victorious	+ 32"
9	Einer Rubio (COL)	Movistar Team	+ 36"
10	Tim Wellens (BEL)	Lotto–Soudal	+ 36"

=== Stage 6 ===
14 August 2021 – Katowice to Katowice, 17.9 km (11.1 mi) (ITT)

Stage 6 Result
Rank	Rider	Team	Time
1	Rémi Cavagna (FRA)	Deceuninck–Quick-Step	22' 10"
2	João Almeida (POR)	Deceuninck–Quick-Step	+ 13"
3	Maciej Bodnar (POL)	Bora–Hansgrohe	+ 16"
4	Mikkel Bjerg (DEN)	UAE Team Emirates	+ 18"
5	Michał Kwiatkowski (POL)	INEOS Grenadiers	+ 19"
6	Max Walscheid (GER)	Team Qhubeka NextHash	+ 21"
7	Nikias Arndt (GER)	Team DSM	+ 28"
8	Mikkel Frølich Honoré (DEN)	Deceuninck–Quick-Step	+ 29"
9	Matej Mohorič (SLO)	Team Bahrain Victorious	+ 31"
10	Matthias Brändle (AUT)	Israel Start-Up Nation	+ 32"

General classification after Stage 6
Rank	Rider	Team	Time
1	João Almeida (POR)	Deceuninck–Quick-Step	23h 17' 07"
2	Matej Mohorič (SLO)	Team Bahrain Victorious	+ 20"
3	Michał Kwiatkowski (POL)	INEOS Grenadiers	+ 27"
4	Diego Ulissi (ITA)	UAE Team Emirates	+ 37"
5	Mikkel Frølich Honoré (DEN)	Deceuninck–Quick-Step	+ 53"
6	Tim Wellens (BEL)	Lotto–Soudal	+ 57"
7	Jai Hindley (AUS)	Team DSM	+ 1' 06"
8	Dylan Teuns (BEL)	Team Bahrain Victorious	+ 1' 25"
9	Ben Tulett (GBR)	Alpecin–Fenix	+ 1' 28"
10	Pascal Eenkhoorn (NED)	Team Jumbo–Visma	+ 1' 30"

=== Stage 7 ===
15 August 2021 – Zabrze to Kraków, 145.1 km (90.2 mi)

Stage 7 Result
Rank	Rider	Team	Time
1	Julius van den Berg (NED)	EF Education–Nippo	2h 58' 46"
2	Alexis Renard (FRA)	Israel Start-Up Nation	+ 0"
3	Matteo Jorgenson (USA)	Movistar Team	+ 0"
4	Gianni Moscon (ITA)	INEOS Grenadiers	+ 0"
5	Álvaro Hodeg (COL)	Deceuninck–Quick-Step	+ 3"
6	Fernando Gaviria (COL)	UAE Team Emirates	+ 3"
7	Olav Kooij (NED)	Team Jumbo–Visma	+ 3"
8	John Degenkolb (GER)	Lotto–Soudal	+ 3"
9	Phil Bauhaus (GER)	Team Bahrain Victorious	+ 3"
10	Lionel Taminiaux (BEL)	Alpecin–Fenix	+ 3"

General classification after Stage 7
Rank	Rider	Team	Time
1	João Almeida (POR)	Deceuninck–Quick-Step	26h 15' 56"
2	Matej Mohorič (SLO)	Team Bahrain Victorious	+ 20"
3	Michał Kwiatkowski (POL)	INEOS Grenadiers	+ 27"
4	Diego Ulissi (ITA)	UAE Team Emirates	+ 37"
5	Mikkel Frølich Honoré (DEN)	Deceuninck–Quick-Step	+ 53"
6	Tim Wellens (BEL)	Lotto–Soudal	+ 57"
7	Jai Hindley (AUS)	Team DSM	+ 1' 06"
8	Dylan Teuns (BEL)	Team Bahrain Victorious	+ 1' 25"
9	Ben Tulett (GBR)	Alpecin–Fenix	+ 1' 28"
10	Pascal Eenkhoorn (NED)	Team Jumbo–Visma	+ 1' 30"

== Classification leadership table ==
Classification leadership by stage
Stage	Winner	General classification (Polish: Żółta koszulka)	Sprints classification (Polish: Klasyfikacja sprinterska)	Mountains classification (Polish: Klasyfikacja górska)	Active rider classification (Polish: Klasyfikacja najaktywniejszych)	Polish rider classification (Polish: Najlepszy Polak)	Team classification (Polish: Klasyfikacja drużynowa)
1	Phil Bauhaus	Phil Bauhaus	Phil Bauhaus	Michał Paluta	Yevgeniy Fedorov	Michał Kwiatkowski	Team Bahrain Victorious
2	João Almeida	João Almeida	Matej Mohorič	Michał Paluta	Yevgeniy Fedorov	Michał Kwiatkowski	Intermarché–Wanty–Gobert Matériaux
3	Fernando Gaviria	João Almeida	Michał Kwiatkowski	Łukasz Owsian	Taco van der Hoorn	Michał Kwiatkowski	Intermarché–Wanty–Gobert Matériaux
4	João Almeida	João Almeida	Michał Kwiatkowski	Łukasz Owsian	Taco van der Hoorn	Michał Kwiatkowski	Intermarché–Wanty–Gobert Matériaux
5	Nikias Arndt	João Almeida	Matej Mohorič	Łukasz Owsian	Taco van der Hoorn	Michał Kwiatkowski	Intermarché–Wanty–Gobert Matériaux
6	Rémi Cavagna	João Almeida	João Almeida	Łukasz Owsian	Taco van der Hoorn	Michał Kwiatkowski	Deceuninck–Quick-Step
7	Julius van den Berg	João Almeida	João Almeida	Łukasz Owsian	Taco van der Hoorn	Michał Kwiatkowski	Deceuninck–Quick-Step
Final		João Almeida	João Almeida	Łukasz Owsian	Taco van der Hoorn	Michał Kwiatkowski	Deceuninck–Quick-Step

- On stage 2, Álvaro Hodeg, who was second in the sprints classification, wore the white jersey, because first-placed Phil Bauhaus wore the yellow jersey as the leader of the general classification.
- On stage 7, Michał Kwiatkowski, who was second in the sprints classification, wore the white jersey, because first-placed João Almeida wore the yellow jersey as the leader of the general classification.

== Final classification standings ==
Legend
Denotes the winner of the general classification	Denotes the winner of the mountains classification
Denotes the winner of the sprints classification	Denotes the winner of the active rider classification

=== General classification ===
Final general classification (1–10)
Rank	Rider	Team	Time
1	João Almeida (POR)	Deceuninck–Quick-Step	26h 15' 56"
2	Matej Mohorič (SLO)	Team Bahrain Victorious	+ 20"
3	Michał Kwiatkowski (POL)	INEOS Grenadiers	+ 27"
4	Diego Ulissi (ITA)	UAE Team Emirates	+ 37"
5	Mikkel Frølich Honoré (DEN)	Deceuninck–Quick-Step	+ 53"
6	Tim Wellens (BEL)	Lotto–Soudal	+ 57"
7	Jai Hindley (AUS)	Team DSM	+ 1' 06"
8	Dylan Teuns (BEL)	Team Bahrain Victorious	+ 1' 25"
9	Ben Tulett (GBR)	Alpecin–Fenix	+ 1' 28"
10	Pascal Eenkhoorn (NED)	Team Jumbo–Visma	+ 1' 30"

=== Sprints classification ===
Final sprints classification (1–10)
Rank	Rider	Team	Points
1	João Almeida (POR)	Deceuninck–Quick-Step	84
2	Michał Kwiatkowski (POL)	INEOS Grenadiers	83
3	Matej Mohorič (SLO)	Team Bahrain Victorious	80
4	Diego Ulissi (ITA)	UAE Team Emirates	69
5	Phil Bauhaus (GER)	Team Bahrain Victorious	50
6	Mikkel Frølich Honoré (DEN)	Deceuninck–Quick-Step	47
7	Hugo Hofstetter (FRA)	Israel Start-Up Nation	42
8	Dion Smith (NZL)	Team BikeExchange	38
9	Tim Wellens (BEL)	Lotto–Soudal	36
10	David Dekker (NED)	Team Jumbo–Visma	36

=== Mountains classification ===
Final mountains classification (1–10)
Rank	Rider	Team	Points
1	Łukasz Owsian (POL)	Poland	50
2	Emīls Liepiņš (LAT)	Trek–Segafredo	30
3	Jonas Rickaert (BEL)	Alpecin–Fenix	22
4	Daniel Arroyave (COL)	EF Education–Nippo	22
5	Yevgeniy Fedorov (KAZ)	Astana–Premier Tech	9
6	Michał Paluta (POL)	Poland	8
7	Attila Valter (HUN)	Groupama–FDJ	6
8	Lukas Pöstlberger (AUT)	Bora–Hansgrohe	5
9	Filippo Conca (ITA)	Lotto–Soudal	5
10	Marco Canola (ITA)	Gazprom–RusVelo	5

=== Active rider classification ===
Final active rider classification (1–10)
Rank	Rider	Team	Points
1	Taco van der Hoorn (NED)	Intermarché–Wanty–Gobert Matériaux	14
2	Yevgeniy Fedorov (KAZ)	Astana–Premier Tech	6
3	Edward Theuns (BEL)	Trek–Segafredo	5
4	Daniel Arroyave (COL)	EF Education–Nippo	4
5	Gabriel Cullaigh (GBR)	Movistar Team	4
6	Michał Paluta (POL)	Poland	4
7	Michał Kwiatkowski (POL)	INEOS Grenadiers	3
8	Quinten Hermans (BEL)	Intermarché–Wanty–Gobert Matériaux	3
9	Julius van den Berg (NED)	EF Education–Nippo	3
10	Norman Vahtra (EST)	Israel Start-Up Nation	3

=== Team classification ===
Final team classification (1–10)
Rank	Team	Time
1	Deceuninck–Quick-Step	78h 51' 51"
2	Alpecin–Fenix	+ 1' 52"
3	Intermarché–Wanty–Gobert Matériaux	+ 2' 20"
4	Lotto–Soudal	+ 2' 21"
5	AG2R Citroën Team	+ 3' 06"
6	Team BikeExchange	+ 3' 06"
7	Movistar Team	+ 6' 11"
8	Team Jumbo–Visma	+ 7' 30"
9	Astana–Premier Tech	+ 7' 55"
10	Team DSM	+ 9' 59"
