= Bronisława Kondratowicz =

Polish folklorist

Bronisława Kondratowicz (née Łapczyńska) (1854–1949 ) was a Polish photographer, collector of folk art, researcher of highlander folklore and a founder of the Warsaw Public Library. She died in the home she built in the Tartar mountains called "Chałupa pod wykrotem" (Cottage under fallen trees).

== Biography ==
Bronisława (sometimes called Maria Bronisława) was born in Płock into the Łapczyńska family of intellectuals. She graduated from Płock High School. Her father was a high school teacher who fought against the Russians in the November Uprising. In 1879, she married Hieronim Kondratowicz, a successful mining specialist. They lived initially in the Polish Dąbrowa Basin, then in Russia, and finally in Warsaw, Poland, where she lived until she was widowed in 1923.

Called "a patriotic activist," from 1900 to 1905, she smuggled independence materials, primarily brochures and newspapers, across the partitioned territories. She also participated in various independence campaigns. After 1894, she returned to the Tatra Mountains every year, gradually becoming increasingly involved in learning and studying highland culture, traditions and folklore there. Her close friends included the Dembowski family, Sabała, Stanisław Witkiewicz, Wojciech Brzega, Tytus Chałubiński, Karol Prószyński, and Bartłomiej Obrochta. After her husband died, she lived in the "Chałupa pod wykrótem," which she designed together with Stanisław Witkiewicz.

She and her husband were founders of the Warsaw Public Library on Koszykowa Street.

She died in Zakopane on 26 February 1949 and was buried in accordance with her will near the graves of Stanisław Witkiewicz and the Dembowski family at the Old Cemetery (officially called, Cemetery of the Meritorious at Pęksowy Brzyzek) in Zakopane.

== Photographic achievements ==
Kondratowicz was active in the Tatra Museum in Zakopane and the Polish Tourist and Sightseeing Society (PTK), and collaborated with the Warsaw Ethnographic Museum. She devoted herself to photography and gained fluency in the Podhale dialect, and she became known for her photographs of traditional architecture. She also collected pieces of folk art not only from Podhale, but also from Silesia and other mountain regions. One of her photographs shows a street reminiscent of the Slovak Spiš region, with a row of houses with half-gabled highlander roofs, along with their baskets and pinnacles. Her photographs were published in, among others, the album "Village and Town" and in "Wooden Architecture and Wooden Products in Old Poland" by historian Zygmunt Gloger. She donated a collection of photographs of historic wooden architecture to the Tatra Museum, including over 130 prints and 30 glass negatives.

Among the pieces in her collection that she donated to the Tatra Museum were: an eighteenth-century sculpture of Saint Mark the Evangelist from Czarny Dunajec; a crucifix from Stare Bystre; a painting of the Holy Family at work from Kluszkowce; a fire starter; a miner's lamp; a rope-making device and a spinning wheel from Czarny Dunajec. The collection was a source of much history and information about the Tatra Mountains and the Tatra foothills, and especially Zakopane.

== Legacy ==
- She was named an honorary member of the Society of Polish Artists and Designers (TOnZP)
- Włodzimierz Wnuk painted her portrait in his novel Towards the Tatras.
- Kazimierz Mokłowski in his book Folk Art (1903) used photos taken by her (pp. 463, 464, 465) and sketched "The Peak from Będzin, Piotrków Governorate" based on her photo (p. 479).
