= Orava-Nowy Targ Basin =

Geography of Poland and Slovakia

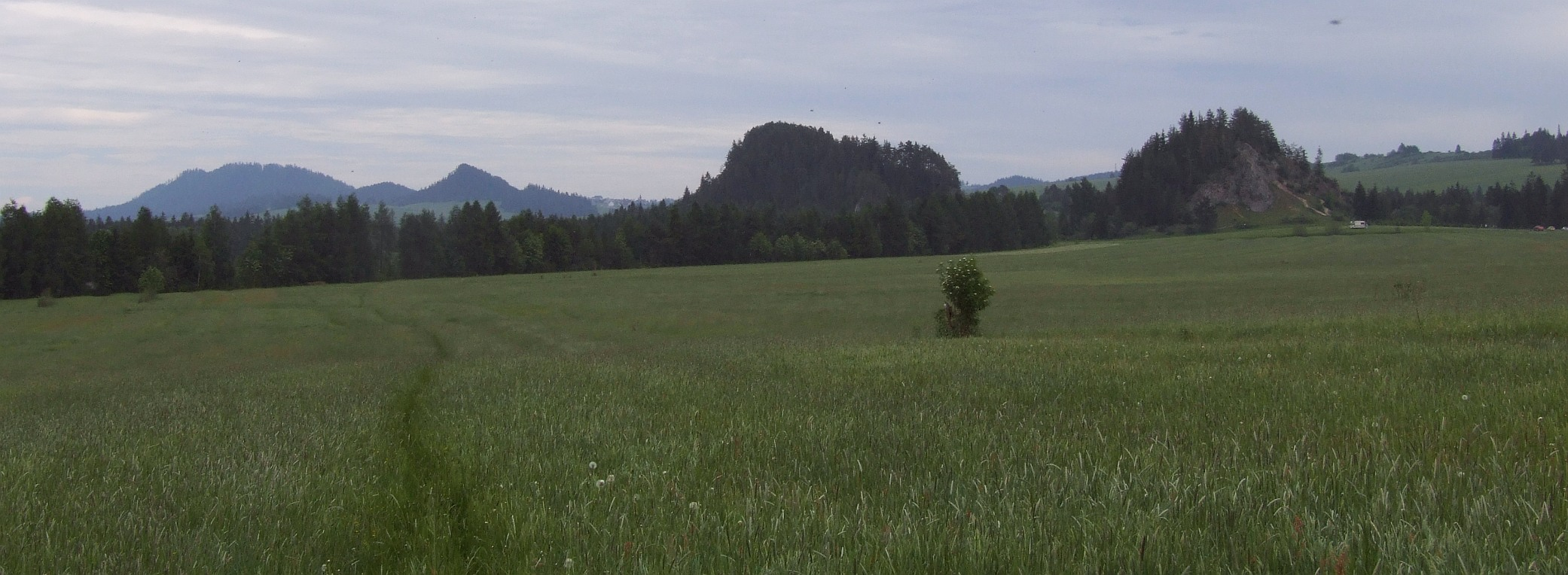
Nowy Targ Basin with Pieniny Spiskie in the background

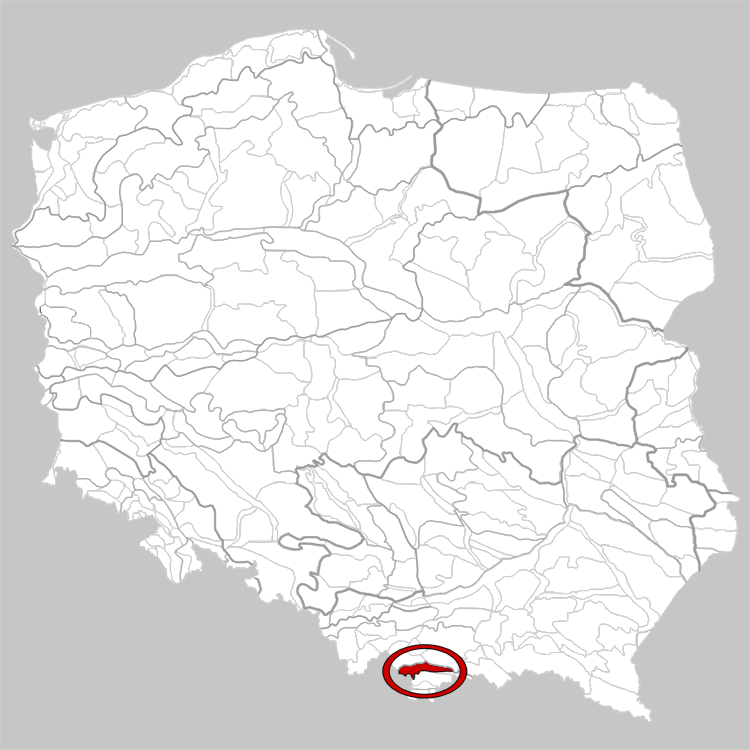
The area within Poland

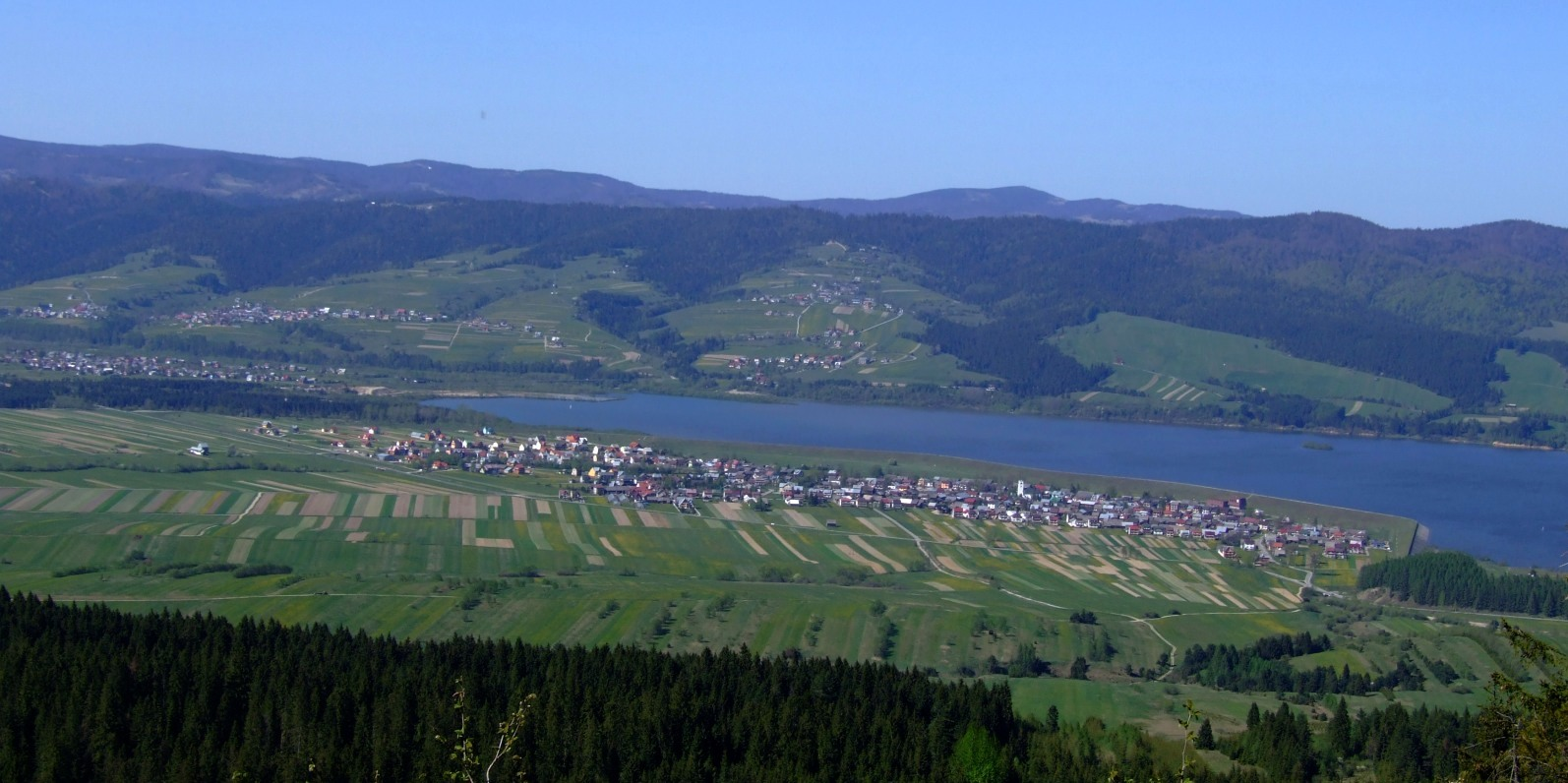
A fragment of the Nowy Targ basin (Frydman) and a view of the Gorce Mountains

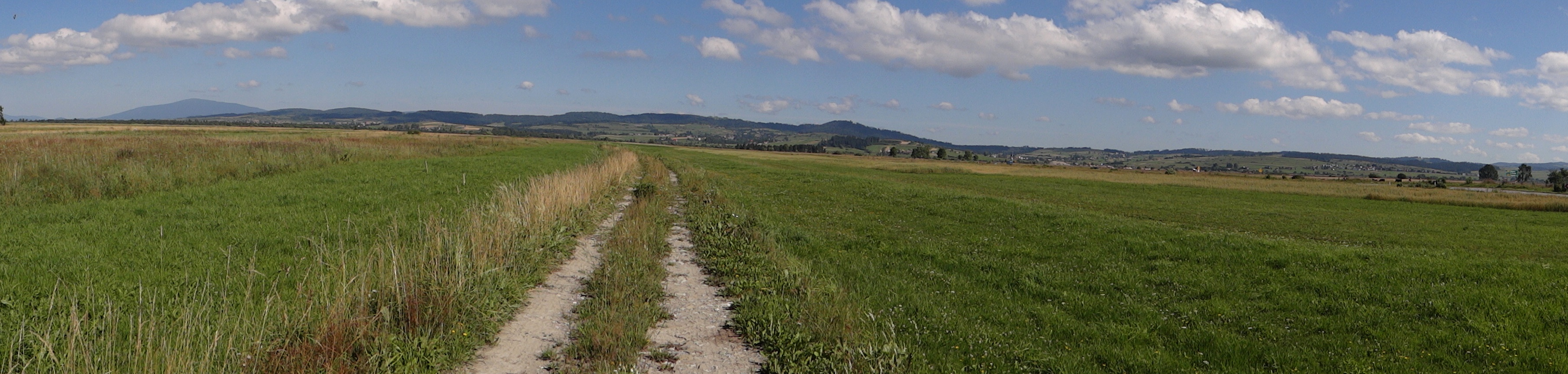
A view of Babia Góra and Beskid Orawsko-Podhalański

The Orava-Nowy Targ Basin (Polish: Kotlina Orawsko-Nowotarska) is the northern, lowest part of the Podhale-Magura Area, between the Western Beskids in the north and the Spisko-Gubałowski Highlands in the south.

== Boundaries ==
The boundaries are as follows.

- to the west, along the foothills of the Slovak Orava Beskids, slightly to the west of the Orava reservoir
- to the north, the basin borders on the Działy Orawskie, the Beskid Orawsko-Podhalański and the Gorce Mountains. The border runs on the northern side of the Orava reservoir, through the Czarna Orawa valley, Piekielnik (a tributary of Czarna Orawa), along the foot of the hills of the Działy Orawskie to Nowy Targ, from here through the Dunajec valley to the Lake Czorsztyn, which is located within the Nowy Targ Basin.
- eastern border: a dam on the Lake Czorsztyn
- from the south, the valley borders with the Pieniny Mountains, Pogórze Bukowińskie and Pogórze Gubałowskie. The border runs along the southern banks of the Lake Czorsztyn to the western end of Zielone Skałki, from here along the northern foothills of the Pieniny Spiskie and Skalice Nowotarskie (from Obłazowa through Cisowa Skała and Ranisberg), further up, initially along the Wielki Rogoźnik stream, then along the north-western foothills of the Pogórze Gubałowskie on eastern side of the Czarny Dunajec to Koniówka. In Slovakia, the border runs along the Orava valley and the foothills of the Pogórze Skoruszyńskie.

== The Orava Basin and the Nowy Targ Basin ==
The entire basin is uniform in terms of landscape and of the same origin, but in terms of hydrography, it is divided into two parts:

- Orava Basin - the western part, drained by the Orava River and located in the Black Sea catchment area
- Nowy Targ Basin - the eastern part, drained by the Dunajec River and located in the catchment area of the Baltic Sea

The European watershed, dividing the Black Sea basin and the Baltic Sea basin, runs through the Polish side of the Orava-Nowy Targ Basin, with few distinguishing features in the terrain. This section runs from the town of Koniówka on the western side of the Czarny Dunajec river to the north, through the peat bogs to the town of Piekielnik. The slopes of both parts of the basin are inclined in opposite directions. The slopes of the Orava Basin descend in the west to a height of about 600 m above sea level, while the slopes of the Nowy Targ Basin descend to about 510 m above sea level on its eastern edges.

== Description of the region ==
The basin was formed in the Neogene as a result of the folding of the area between mountain ranges and foothills. In the basin created in this way, a lake was formed, which over time was filled with sediments of gravel and clay; their thickness in the western part reaches 300 m. Also in the Quaternary, during successive glacial periods, alluvial cones accumulated here glacial and river deposits. In the basin, and especially in the Baltic-Black Sea watershed that cuts it across, a unique complex of raised bogs has developed. These bogs, completely dependent on rainwater, began to form around 10,000 years ago, when the climate warmed after the glacial period. Today, they present a complex of raised bogs, bogs and marsh forests, unique in Poland and at the same time rare in Europe, giving a specific character to the landscape of the Basin.

The vegetation of peat bogs is particularly characteristic. In addition to sphagnum mosses, there are plants adapted to the deficiency of nutrients - insectivorous sundews and common butterwort. A unique feature of the Orava-Nowy Targ Basin bogs is the presence of mountain pine, which is usually found at higher altitudes, as well as the rare mud pine (a form of Rhaetic pine), which is an introgressive hybrid of mountain pine and Scots pine. In one of the peat bogs, called Puścizna Wielka, the site of cloudberry, a rare plant considered a glacial relict, was discovered in 2002. It is the southernmost habitat of this plant in the world.

The region is moderately transformed as a result of human activity. It has two large, artificially created water reservoirs: the Orava reservoir and the Lake Czorsztyn. The main towns are Nowy Targ in Poland and Námestovo in Slovakia.

The Orawa-Nowy Targ Basin covers three historical and ethnographic lands: Orava in the western part (e.g. Jabłonka, Chyżne, and the entire area of the valley in Slovakia), Podhale in the eastern part (e.g. Czarny Dunajec, Nowy Targ) and a small fragment of Spiš at the eastern end (including Nowa Biała, Frydman).
