= Wojciech Kozub =

Polish biathlete (born 1976)

Personal information
- Nationality: Polish
- Born: 20 July 1976 (age 48); Ratułów, Poland

Sport
- Sport: Biathlon

Wojciech Kozub (born 20 July 1976) is a Polish biathlete. He competed at the 1998 Winter Olympics and the 2002 Winter Olympics.
