= Czerwienne =

- Village
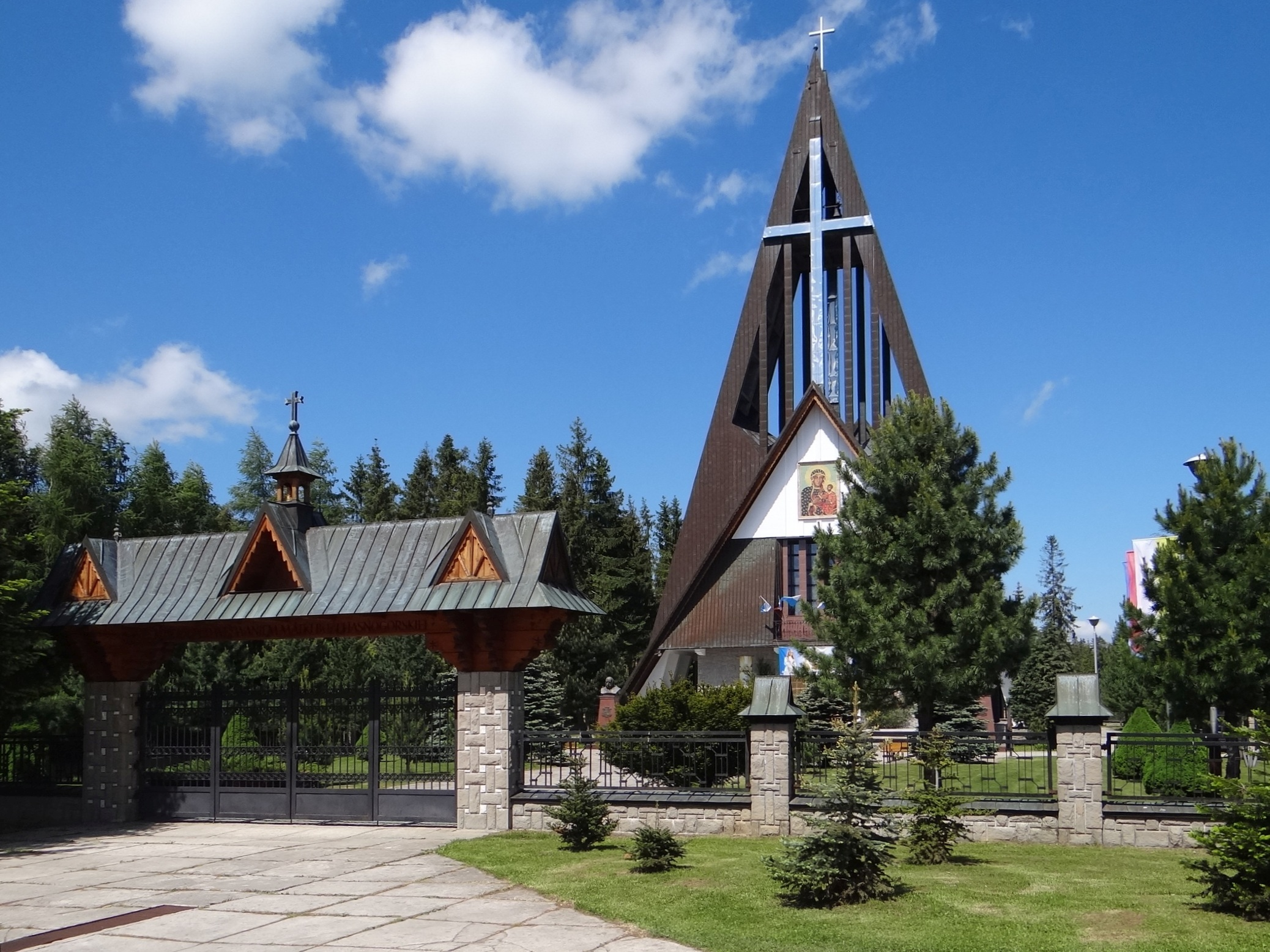
- Church of Our Lady of Częstochowa (Bachledówka Sanctuary)

- Coat of arms

- Location within Poland
- Coordinates: 49°23′N 19°54′E
- Country: Poland
- Voivodeship: Lesser Poland
- County: Nowy Targ
- Gmina: Czarny Dunajec
- Website: http://www.czerwienne.net

Czerwienne [t͡ʂɛrˈvjɛnnɛ] is a village in the administrative district of Gmina Czarny Dunajec, within Nowy Targ County, Lesser Poland Voivodeship, in southern Poland, close to the border with Slovakia.
