= Gmina Spytkowice =

Gmina Spytkowice may refer to either of the following rural administrative districts in Lesser Poland Voivodeship, Poland:

- Gmina Spytkowice, Nowy Targ County
- Gmina Spytkowice, Wadowice County
