= Pieniążkowice =

- Village
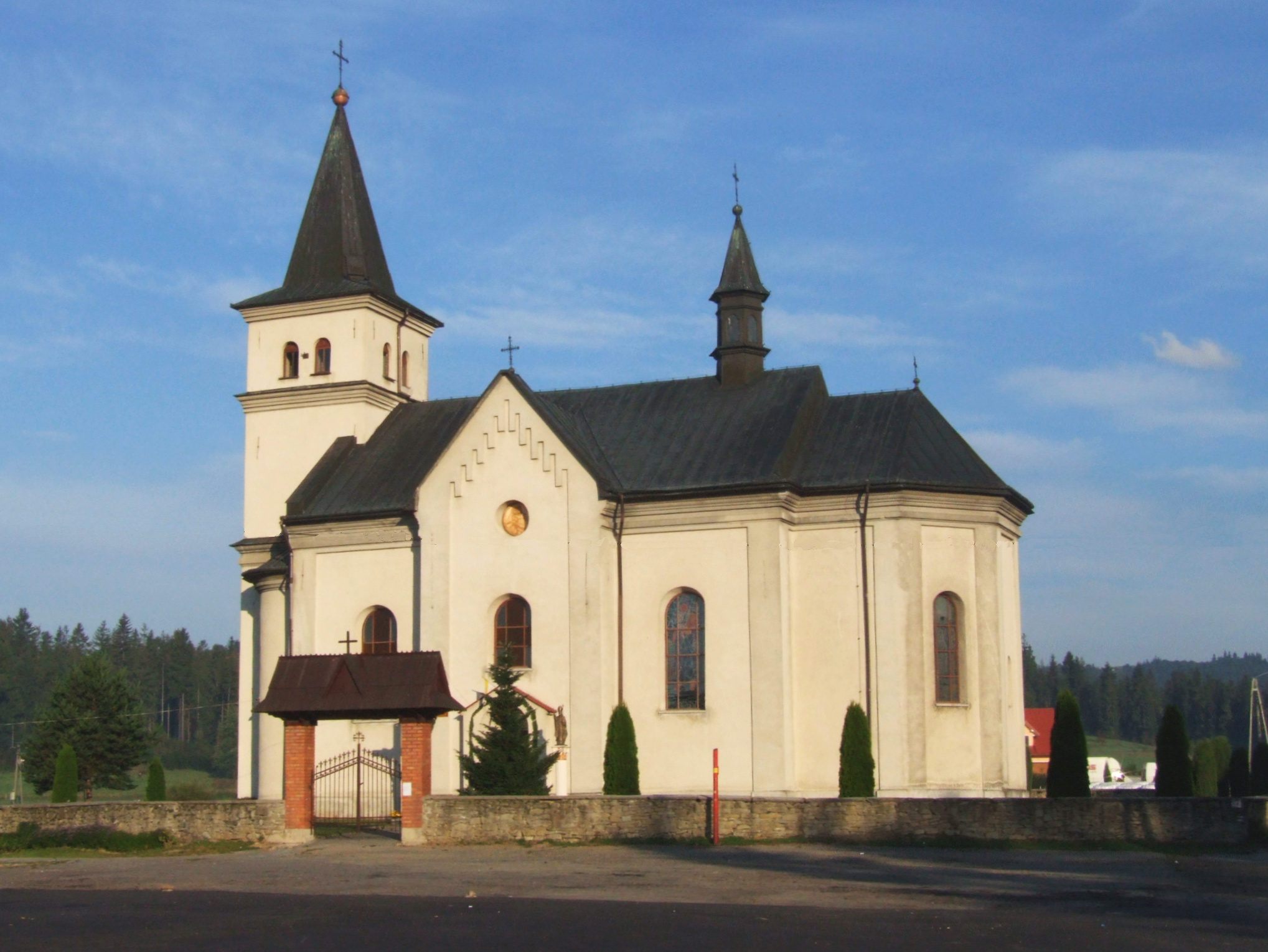
- Church of Our Lady of Sorrows

- Coat of arms

- Location within Poland
- Coordinates: 49°31′N 19°54′E
- Country: Poland
- Voivodeship: Lesser Poland
- County: Nowy Targ
- Gmina: Czarny Dunajec

Population (approx.)
  - Total: 800

Pieniążkowice [pjɛɲɔ̃ʂkɔˈvit͡sɛ] is a village in the administrative district of Gmina Czarny Dunajec, within Nowy Targ County, Lesser Poland Voivodeship, in southern Poland, close to the border with Slovakia.

The village has an approximate population of 800.
