= Dział, Nowy Targ County =

Dział
- Village
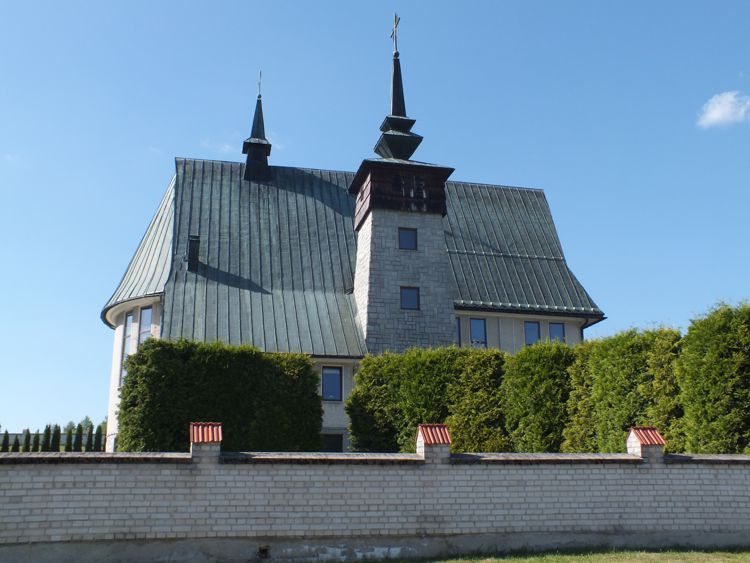
- Catholic church

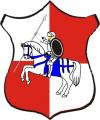
- Coat of arms

- Location within Poland
- Coordinates: 49°30′N 19°55′E
- Country: Poland
- Voivodeship: Lesser Poland
- County: Nowy Targ
- Gmina: Czarny Dunajec

Dział [d͡ʑau̯] is a village in the administrative district of Gmina Czarny Dunajec, within Nowy Targ County, Lesser Poland Voivodeship, in southern Poland, close to the border with Slovakia.
