= Załuczne =

- Village
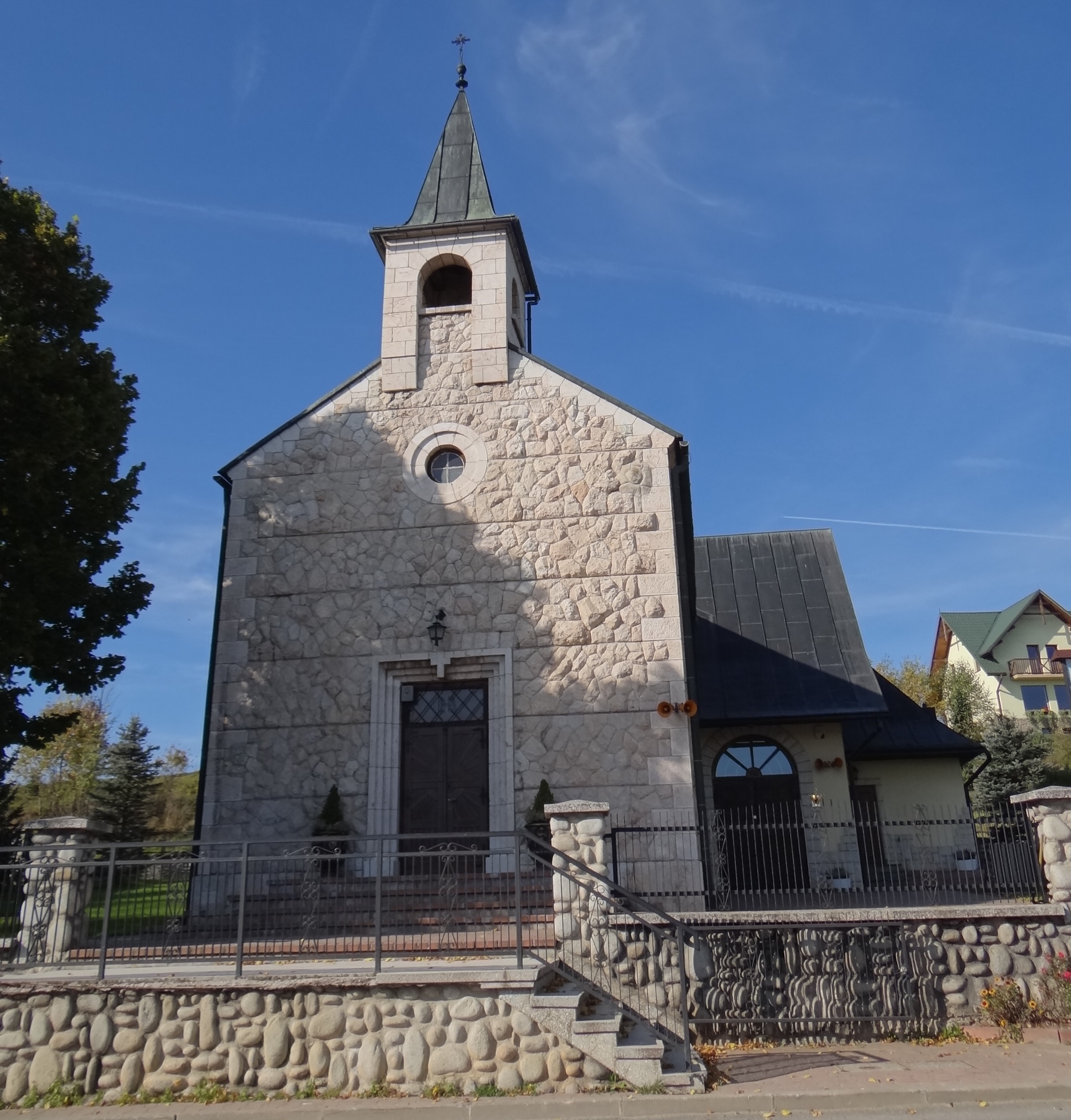
- Local Catholic church

- Coat of arms

- Location within Poland
- Coordinates: 49°30′N 19°50′E
- Country: Poland
- Voivodeship: Lesser Poland
- County: Nowy Targ
- Gmina: Czarny Dunajec
- Website: http://www.zaluczne.net

Załuczne [zaˈwut͡ʂnɛ] is a village in the administrative district of Gmina Czarny Dunajec, within Nowy Targ County, Lesser Poland Voivodeship, in southern Poland, close to the border with Slovakia.
