= Biały Dunajec (river) =

River in Poland

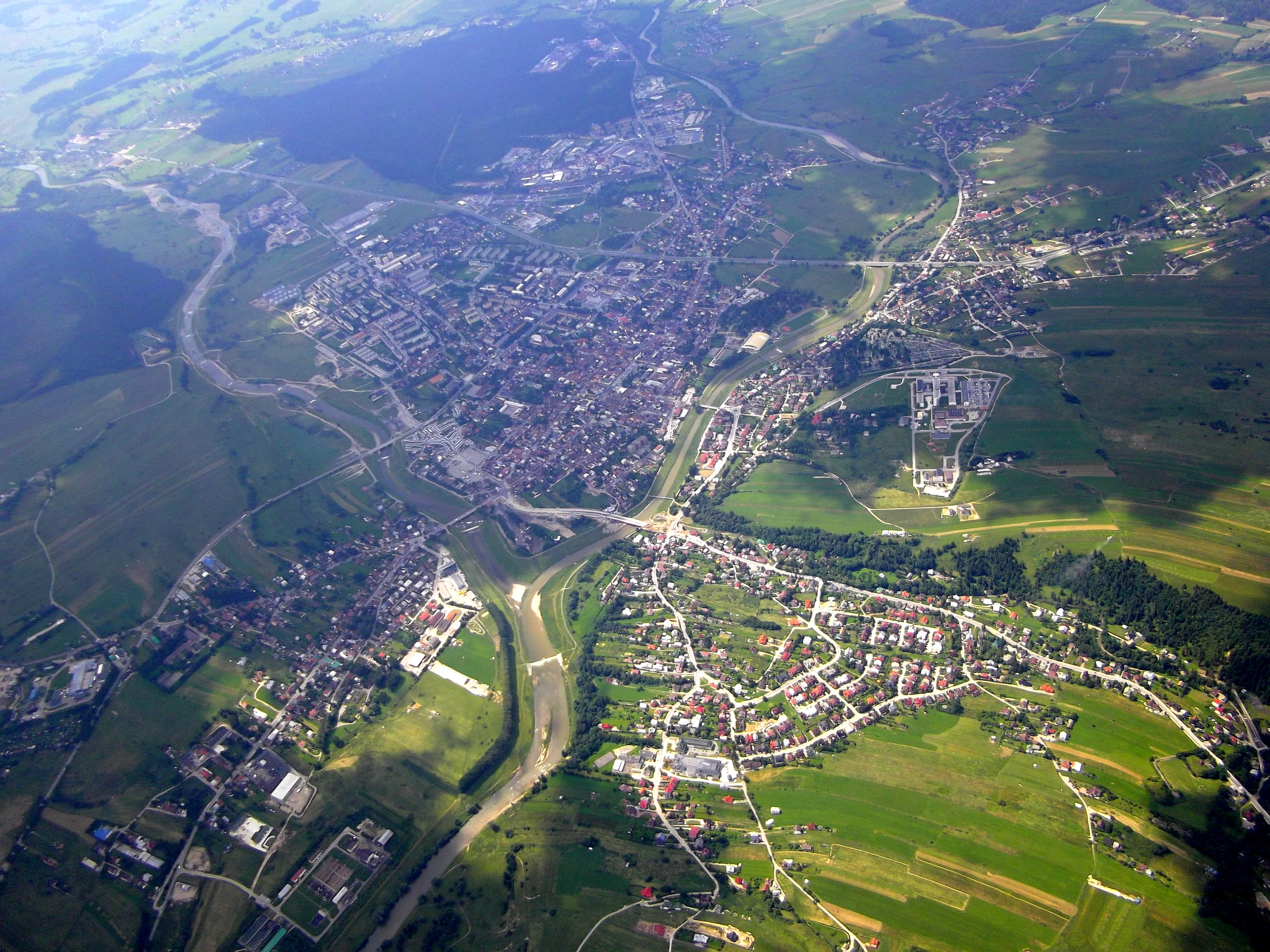

Physical characteristics
- Source
  - location: Confluence of the Zakopianka and Poroniec in Cipki
  - coordinates: 49°20′16.4″N 20°00′05.2″E
  - elevation: 730.2 m (2,396 ft)
- Mouth: Dunajec
  - location: Nowy Targ
  - coordinates: 49°29′04.0″N 20°02′34.9″E
  - elevation: 579 m (1,900 ft)
- Length: 31 km (19 mi)
- Basin size: 224 km^{2} (86 sq mi)

Basin features
- Progression: Dunajec→ Vistula→ Baltic Sea

The Biały Dunajec is a river in Poland, the right tributary of the Dunajec. The river arises at an altitude of approx. 730 m in Poronin from the confluence of rivers Zakopianka and Poroniec. The Biały Dunajec then flows through the eponymous Biały Dunajec village, Szaflary and Nowy Targ, where at an altitude of about 577 m it joins the Czarny Dunajec, giving rise to the Dunajec. The river flows by the Bór na Czerwonem nature reserve. The Biały Dunajec is formed in the Podtatrzański Trench, while its lower course and mouth are located in the Orava-Nowy Targ Basin.

In the upper part of the course, down to Szaflary, the river has a more mountain character. There are large boulders, plunge pools and riffles in its bed, and the width of the river ranges from several meters to several dozen meters. Below Szaflary, the river is regulated and separated by high concrete sills.

== Main tributaries ==
- left: Suchy Potok, Potok Bustrycki, Syposi Potok, Florynów Potok, Krajowy Potok
- right: Świdrów Potok, Potok pod Cyrlą, Potok Gliczarowski, Potok Podlubelski

In spring and summer, the river is characterized by strong water rises (the water level fluctuates on average up to 3.4 m during the year). The Biały Dunajec is 31 km long and has a basin area of 224 km^{2}.

== Fishing ==
It is allowed to fish here only with artificial fly and only from March 15 to December 15. It is allowed to fish along the entire length of the river, from the confluence of Poroniec and Zakopianka to the point where it meets the Czarny Dunajec. The Biały Dunajec is a river interesting for anglers. In the upper part of the river there are many brown and rainbow trouts and a few graylings. In the lower part, below Szaflary, apart from trout, there are also Danube salmon and many graylings.

== See also ==
- List of rivers of Poland
