= Odrowąż, Lesser Poland Voivodeship =

Odrowąż
- Village
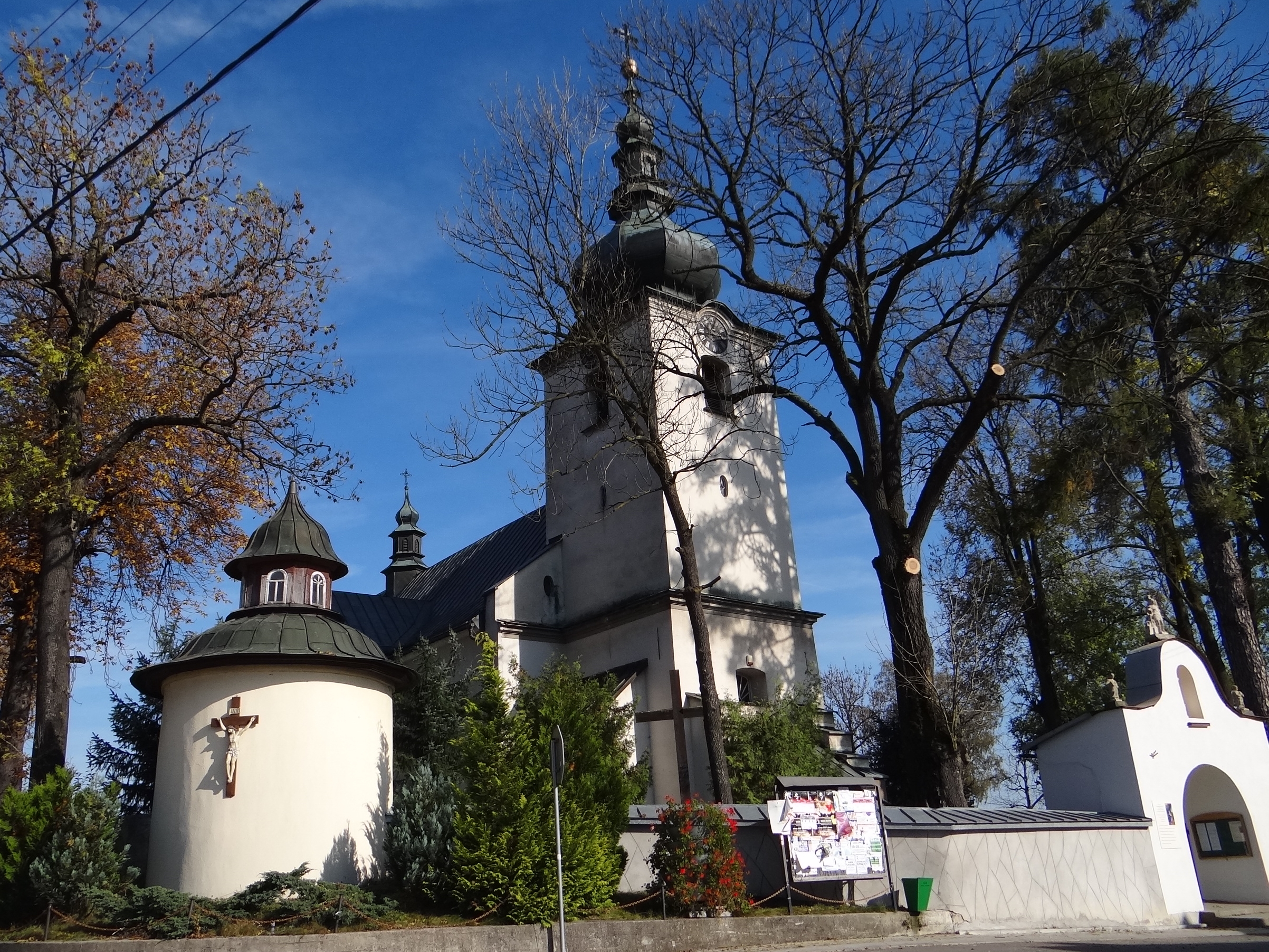
- Local Catholic church

- Location within Poland
- Coordinates: 49°29′51″N 19°51′14″E
- Country: Poland
- Voivodeship: Lesser Poland
- County: Nowy Targ
- Gmina: Czarny Dunajec
- Population: 920

Odrowąż [ɔˈdrɔvɔ̃ʂ] is a village in the administrative district of Gmina Czarny Dunajec, within Nowy Targ County, Lesser Poland Voivodeship, in southern Poland, close to the border with Slovakia.

In the summer of 1940, the German SS stormed the village and evicted the majority of the people in the village.
