= Stare Bystre =

- Village
- Coat of arms

- Location within Poland
- Coordinates: 49°26′N 19°55′E
- Country: Poland
- Voivodeship: Lesser Poland
- County: Nowy Targ
- Gmina: Czarny Dunajec

Stare Bystre [ˈstarɛ ˈbɨstrɛ] is a village in the administrative district of Gmina Czarny Dunajec, within Nowy Targ County, Lesser Poland Voivodeship, in southern Poland, close to the border with Slovakia.
