= Ciche, Lesser Poland Voivodeship =

Ciche
- Village
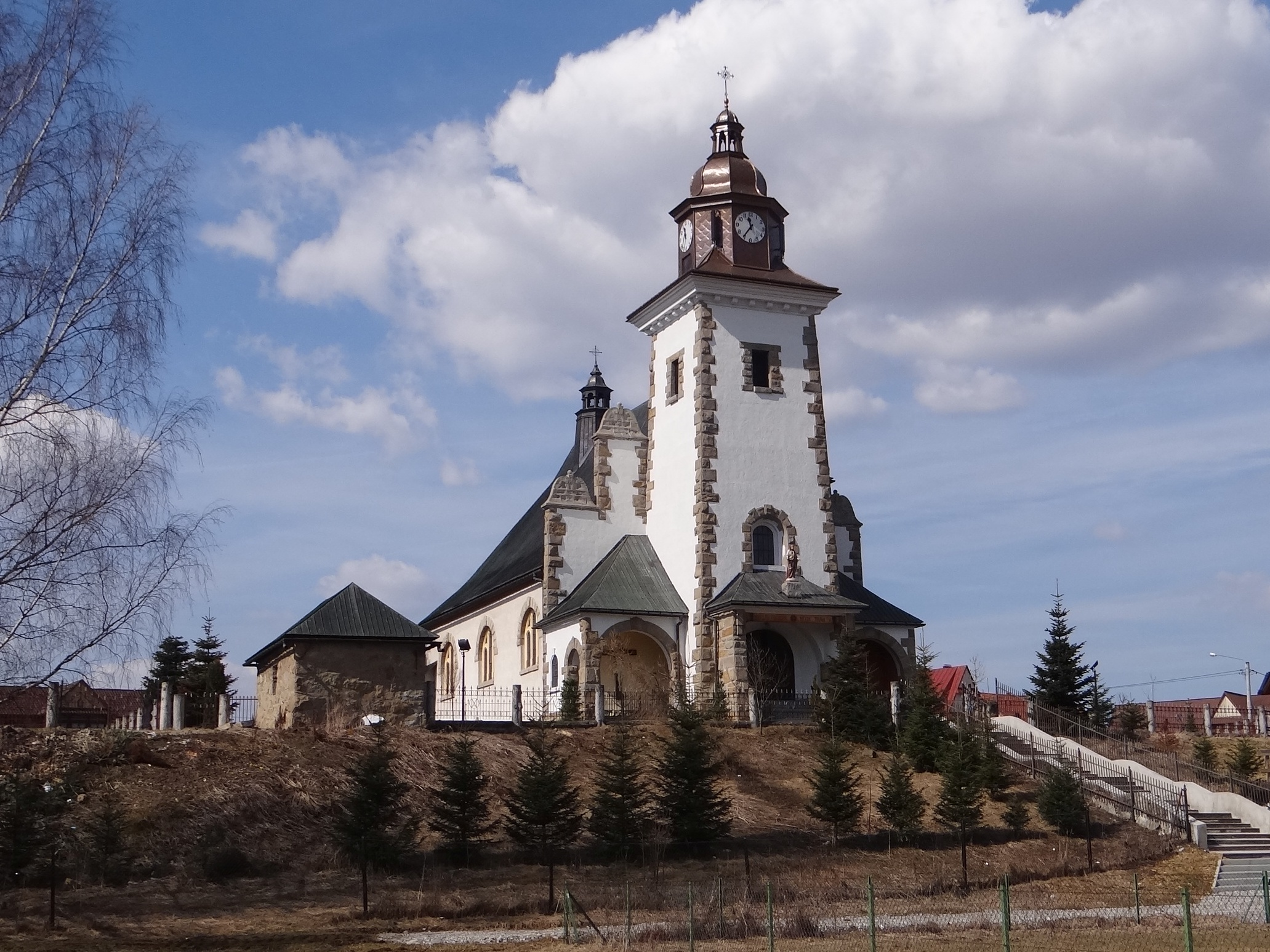
- Church of the Holiest Virgin Mary, the Queen of Poland

- Coat of arms

- Location within Poland
- Coordinates: 49°22′46.3″N 19°50′48.3″E
- Country: Poland
- Voivodeship: Lesser Poland
- County: Nowy Targ
- Gmina: Czarny Dunajec

Population (2005)
  - Total: 2,800
- Postal code: 34-407

Ciche [ˈt͡ɕixɛ] is a village in the administrative district of Gmina Czarny Dunajec, within Nowy Targ County, Lesser Poland Voivodeship, in southern Poland, close to the border with Slovakia.

Historically and ethnographically, the village belongs to the Podhale region and Galicia.
