= Podczerwone =

- Village
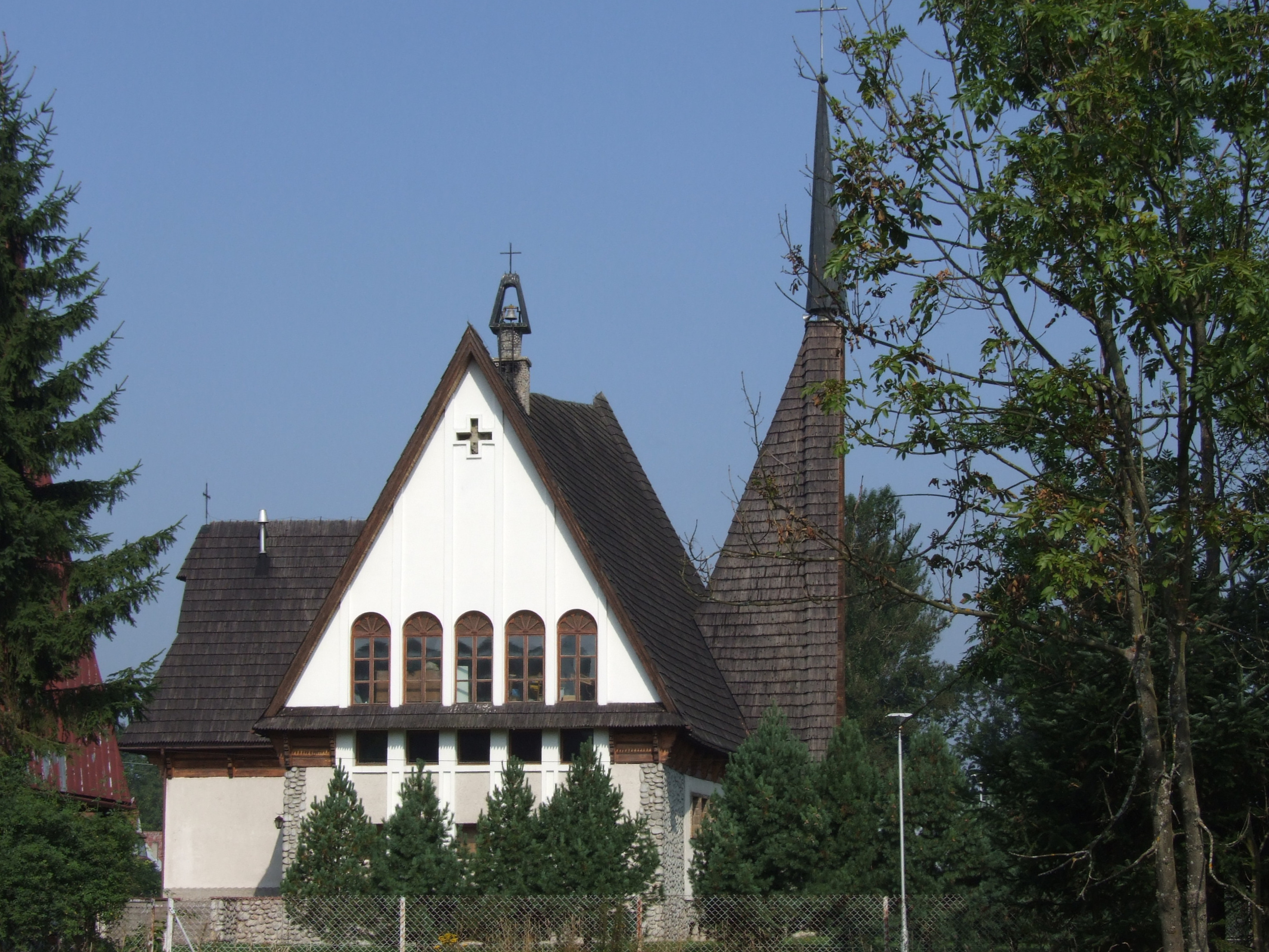
- Local Catholic church

- Coat of arms

- Location within Poland
- Coordinates: 49°24′N 19°49′E
- Country: Poland
- Voivodeship: Lesser Poland
- County: Nowy Targ
- Gmina: Czarny Dunajec
- Website: http://www.podczerwone.com/

Podczerwone [pɔtt͡ʂɛrˈvɔnɛ] is a village in the administrative district of Gmina Czarny Dunajec, within Nowy Targ County, Lesser Poland Voivodeship, in southern Poland, close to the border with Slovakia.

The village of Podczerwone was founded by Szymon Czerwinski under the Royal Decree of Sigismund III Vasa in 1604 giving the property privileges in Western Tatra Mountains and Czarny Dunajec river valley. The privileges included the Dolina Lejowa, Polana Bialy Potok, Hawrylówka, Roztoki, Polynica, the forests of Furtaska, Kryta and Krzyskówka. During Poland's Partition Period (123 years) the region remained under Austrian jurisdiction and the town and its privileges were sold in Vienna to land investors. Under the communists' jurisdiction, in 1976 the governmental decree illegally expropriated Dolina Lejowa. The forests of Furtaska, Kryta, Krzyskowka and Bialy Potok, Hawrylówka and Roztoki valley did survive and remained as part of the 7 Villages Commonwealth with the Head Office in Witów. Presently the village counts about 640 residences. A significant number of them emigrated to the United States and Canada. They became strong contributing members of new North American communities and also active members of the Polish Highlanders Alliance of North America (Związek Podhalan w Ameryce Północnej) in Chicago and Toronto.

== History ==
July 4, 1605 - creation of the village

A royal village founded under the Magdeburg Law by the Pieniazek family of the Odrowąż coat of arms, tenants of Nowy Targ between 1596 and 1605. The first village leaders were Szymon and Barbara Czerwińscy, who belonged to the nobility . Perhaps they were sealed with the Lubicz coat of arms. After Szymon's death, the sons of Władysław and Walenty Czerwińsk also took equal responsibility as nobles. Than themselves in the document of King Władysław IV Vasa from 1646 they are called "honest", which means that they lost their nobility in unknown circumstances. In 1676 they bear the surname Podczerwiński. In addition to the mayor located in the village territory, the village administrator included the White Potok, Niżna Kira, Palenica, Jaworzyna and Hotarz glades located in the Western Tatras.

"The eldest son of Piotr Kistek - Szymon Czerwiński received the privilege of the village of Podczerwon from Zofia from Bogusławice, widow of Saint. Jan Pieniazek, starost of Nowy Targ. The above privilege was approved by King Zygmunt III Waza on July 4, 1605 in Krakow, confirming the rights to the village of the sons of the late Szymon: Walenty and Władysław Czerwiński. "" Genealogy of village leaders in Podhale "part II Maria and Jan Krzeptowscy Jasinek Ed. "Krzeptowscy"

1914

A chapel construction committee was established. He was run by Jędrzej Karcz, who led to the erection of a voluntary brick chapel, inside which an altar with a portal was placed, decorated with a carved statue of Our Lady of Sorrows and the image of St. Joseph. Soon it was consecrated ("Czarny Dunajec and surroundings").

November 29, 1943 - history of partisans

On that day Podczerwone was surrounded by Germans. They were looking for hiding partisans. Apparently, "someone" reported, showed a hiding place near the sawmill, supposedly to save the village from burning. The partisans were shot. Strangely, nobody saw anything, nobody heard anything.

September 13, 1944 - the history of airmen

Near Podczerwone (in Koniówka) the bomber aircraft Flying Fortress No. 44-6412 crashed from 817 squadron 483 group 5 Bomb Wing of the 15th US Air Army. He took part in the bombing of the chemical factory in Blachownia Śląska . Bombardier - second lieutenant Gus J. Kroschewsky, navigator - second lieutenant Richard L. Hansler, deck gunners - sergeant Harold E. Beam, sergeant Gordon W. Sternbeck and platoon Aloys C. Suhling were taken over by soldiers of the Home Army "Limba" who led them to Stare Wierchy, where the unit of Major Andrzej Stobrawa was stationed "Boric". After the Soviet front passed, in February 1945 this group independently asked for help from the Soviets. In March, through Lviv, Kiev, and Odessain Ukraine and Port Fuad in Egypt managed to get to the home base of Sterparone in Italy, then they were sent back to the USA. Other crew members fell into the hands of the Germans. They were: pilot - Second Lieutenant Everette J. Robson, copilot - Second Lieutenant Harold R. Stock, on-board technician - Sergeant Albert W. Van Oostrom, radio operator - Sergeant Philip M. Nance and on-board gunner - Sergeant William N. Barry. All of them were sent to prisoner-of-war camps in Pomerania, and in May 1945, they were transported to the US by the Allied Lucky Strike transit camp in France.

== Communication ==
Podczerwoneis on the communication route running from north to south: from Rabka to Zakopane . This route can serve as an alternative to the crowded " Zakopianka ".

From 1907, a railway line from Nowy Targ ran through Podczerwone through the border crossing Czarny Dunajec-Suchá Hora to Królewianie in Slovakia. The border section (Podczerwone- Sucha Hora) was dismantled after World War II. Until 1981, the Polish section of the line was active in passenger traffic. In 1991 it was demolished. Station buildings, embankments and bridges exist to this day. In the Slovak part, the Kraľovany- Trstená section exists and is still open . In the 1970s, the Trstená-Sucha Hora section was demolished. Due to the construction of a bicycle path in place of the former railway infrastructure, the idea of restoring the connection with Slovakia has been suspended.

== Church ==
Podczerwone belongs to the parish dedicated to Our Lady of Sorrows. Marek Łabuzek is the priest from 2019. The church is located in the center of the town, opposite the OSP fire station.

== Footnotes ==
1. Portal polskawliczbach.pl
2. ↑ CSO: Population - structure according to economic age groups. As of March 31, 2011 . [access February 28, 2018].
3. ↑ GUS. TERYT search engine
4. ↑ Regulation on the list of official place names and parts thereof ( Journal of Laws of 2013, item 200 )
5. ↑ Edmund Długopolski, Privileges of Podhale village leaders, 1914–1921, pp. 24–25 Portal polskawliczbach.pl
6. CSO: Population - structure according to economic age groups. As of March 31, 2011 . [access February 28, 2018].
