= Ratułów =

- Village
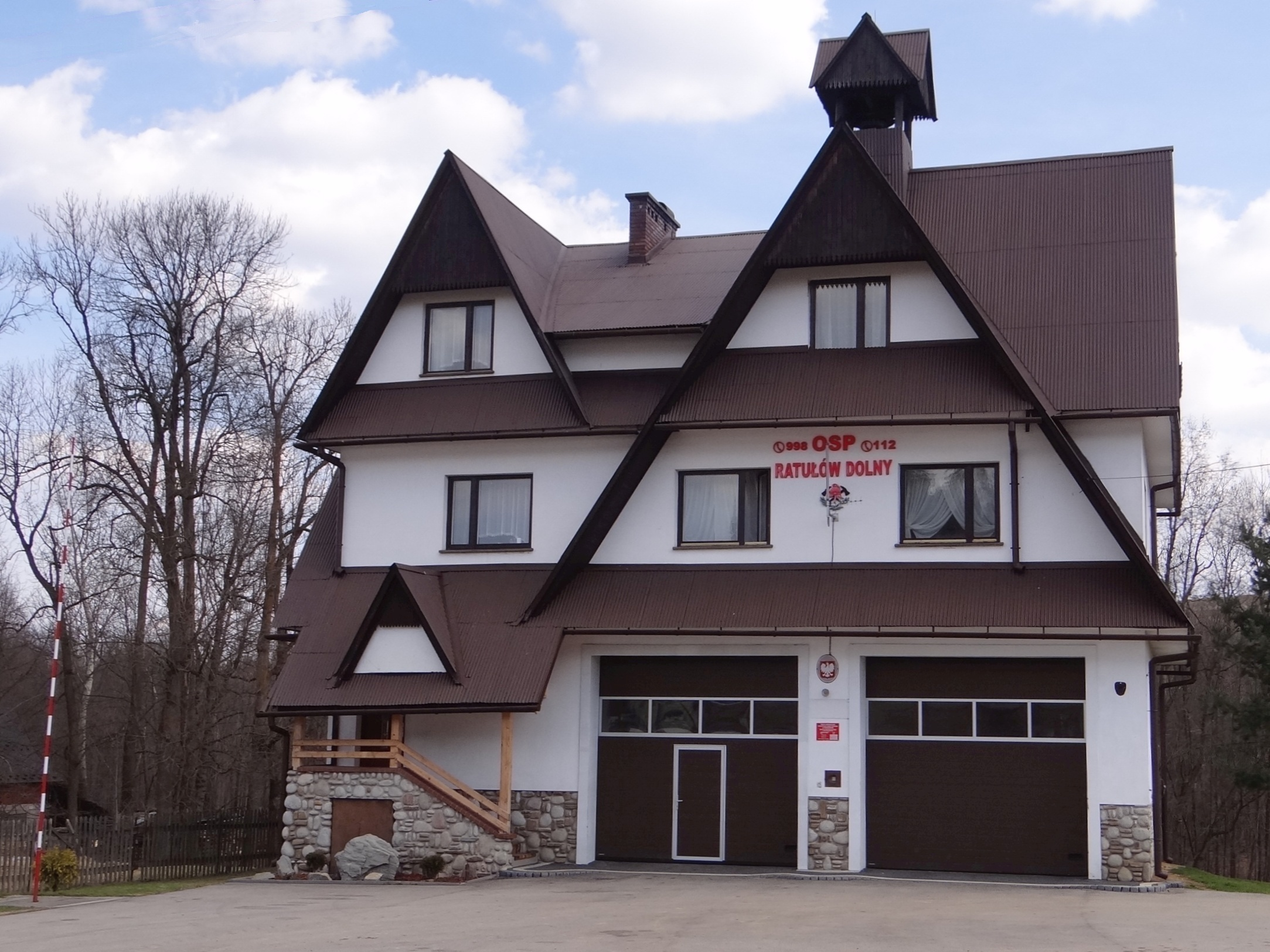
- Fire station

- Coat of arms

- Location within Poland
- Coordinates: 49°22′N 19°54′E
- Country: Poland
- Voivodeship: Lesser Poland
- County: Nowy Targ
- Gmina: Czarny Dunajec

Ratułów [raˈtuwuf] is a village in the administrative district of Gmina Czarny Dunajec, within Nowy Targ County, Lesser Poland Voivodeship, in southern Poland, close to the border with Slovakia.
