= Wróblówka =

- Village
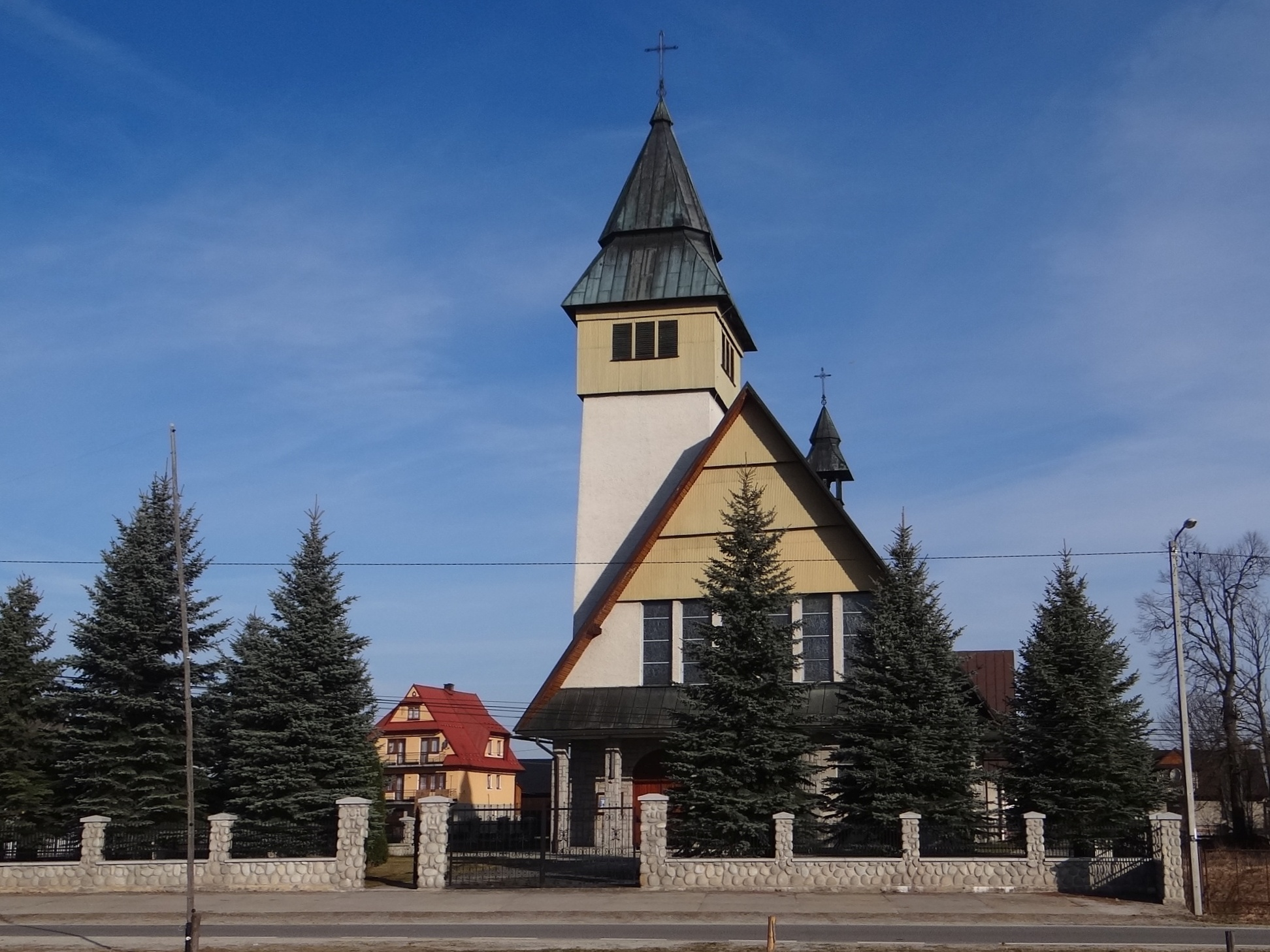
- Catholic church

- Coat of arms

- Location within Poland
- Coordinates: 49°28′N 19°53′E
- Country: Poland
- Voivodeship: Lesser Poland
- County: Nowy Targ
- Gmina: Czarny Dunajec
- Elevation: 550 m (1,800 ft)

Population (approx.)
  - Total: 400

Wróblówka [vruˈblufka] is a village in the administrative district of Gmina Czarny Dunajec, within Nowy Targ County, Lesser Poland Voivodeship, in southern Poland, close to the border with Slovakia.

The village has an approximate population of 400.
