= Spytkowice, Nowy Targ County =

Spytkowice
- Village
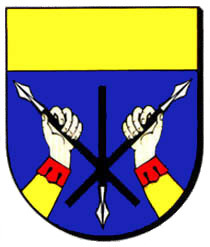
- Coat of arms

- Location within Poland
- Coordinates: 49°34′35″N 19°49′7″E
- Country: Poland
- Voivodeship: Lesser Poland
- County: Nowy Targ
- Gmina: Spytkowice
- Population: 4,000
- Postal code: 34-745
- Website: http://www.spytkowice.pl/

Spytkowice [spɨtkɔˈvit͡sɛ] is a village in Nowy Targ County, Lesser Poland Voivodeship, in southern Poland. It is the seat of the gmina (administrative district) called Gmina Spytkowice.
