= Chochołów, Lesser Poland Voivodeship =

Chochołów
- Village
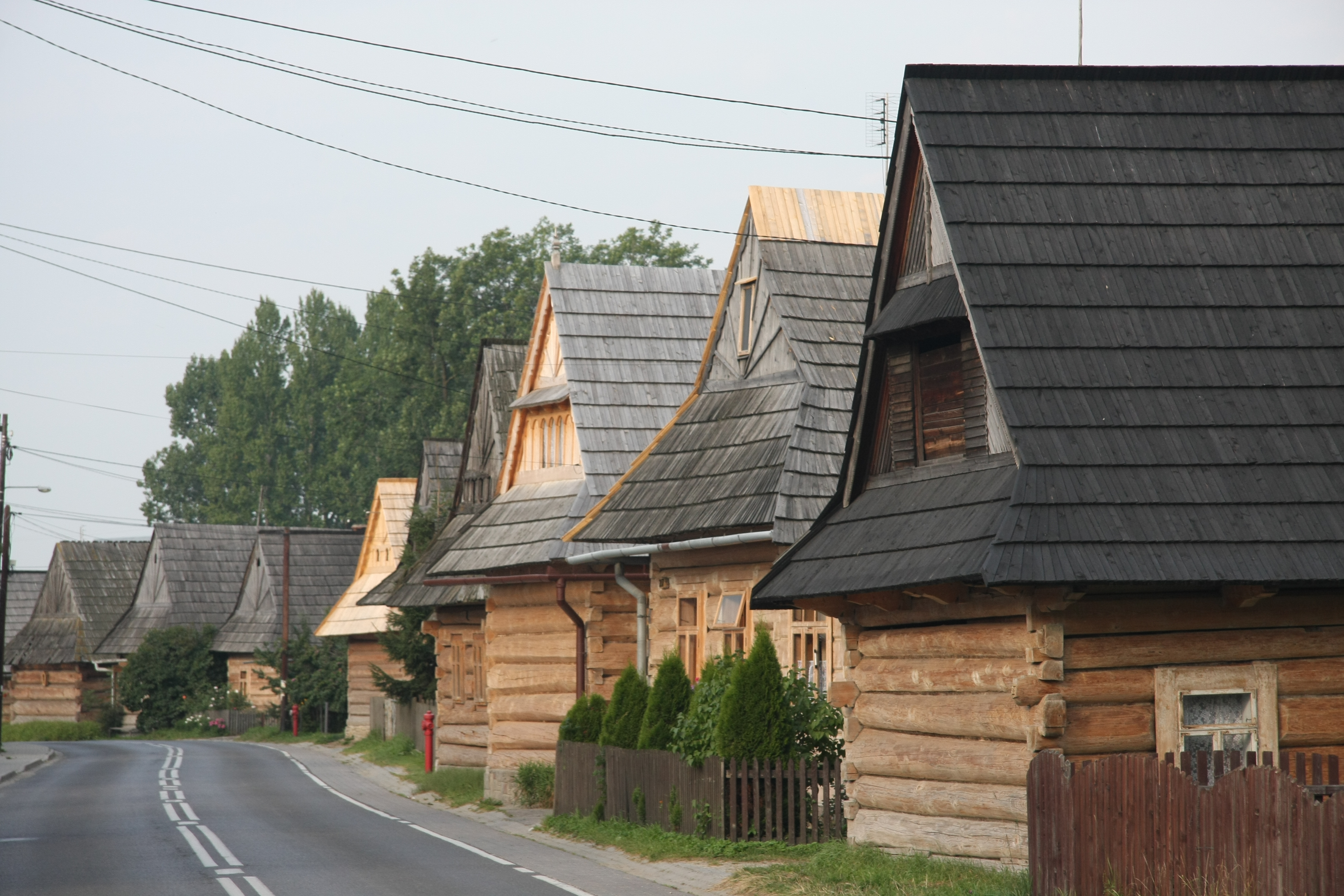
- Wooden houses alongside the main street

- Coat of arms

- Location within Poland
- Coordinates: 49°22′4″N 19°49′2″E
- Country: Poland
- County: Nowy Targ
- Gmina: Czarny Dunajec
- Founded: 16th century
- Population (approx.): 1,135
- Time zone: UTC+1 (CET)
  - Summer (DST): UTC+2 (CEST)
- Vehicle registration: KNT

Chochołów pronounced [xɔˈxɔwuf] is a village in the administrative district of Gmina Czarny Dunajec, within Nowy Targ County, Lesser Poland Voivodeship, in southern Poland, close to the border with Slovakia.

Chochołów lies approximately 9 kilometres (6 mi) south of Czarny Dunajec, 19 km (12 mi) south-west of Nowy Targ, and 101 km (63 mi) south of the regional capital Kraków. The village has an approximate population of 1,135.

== History ==
Chochołów was founded in the 16th century by Bartłomiej Chochołowski, who was appointed hereditary sołtys by Polish King Stephen Báthory for his war merits. The first church was built in the 16th century.

Following the late-18th-century Partitions of Poland, it was annexed by Austria. It became known as the place of the Chochołów Uprising of 1846 against the foreign oppression in the Austrian Partition of Poland. The uprising was crushed by the Austrians, and its leaders were imprisoned in various locations. Following World War I, Poland regained independence and control of the village.

Its economy is closely associated with tourism and the popular Polish-Slovak border crossing to Suchá Hora in the Orava region.

== Sights ==
Chochołów is a village comprised almost exclusively of the heritage Polish wooden houses (góralskie chaty) built by the Polish Gorals highlanders. Prominent heritage sights include the Chochołów Uprising Museum and the Saint Hyacinth church.

A thermal spa area was opened here in 2016 using hot mineral springs from the Dolina Chocholowska valley which is located in some distance to the south in the Tatra Mountains National Park.

== Gallery ==
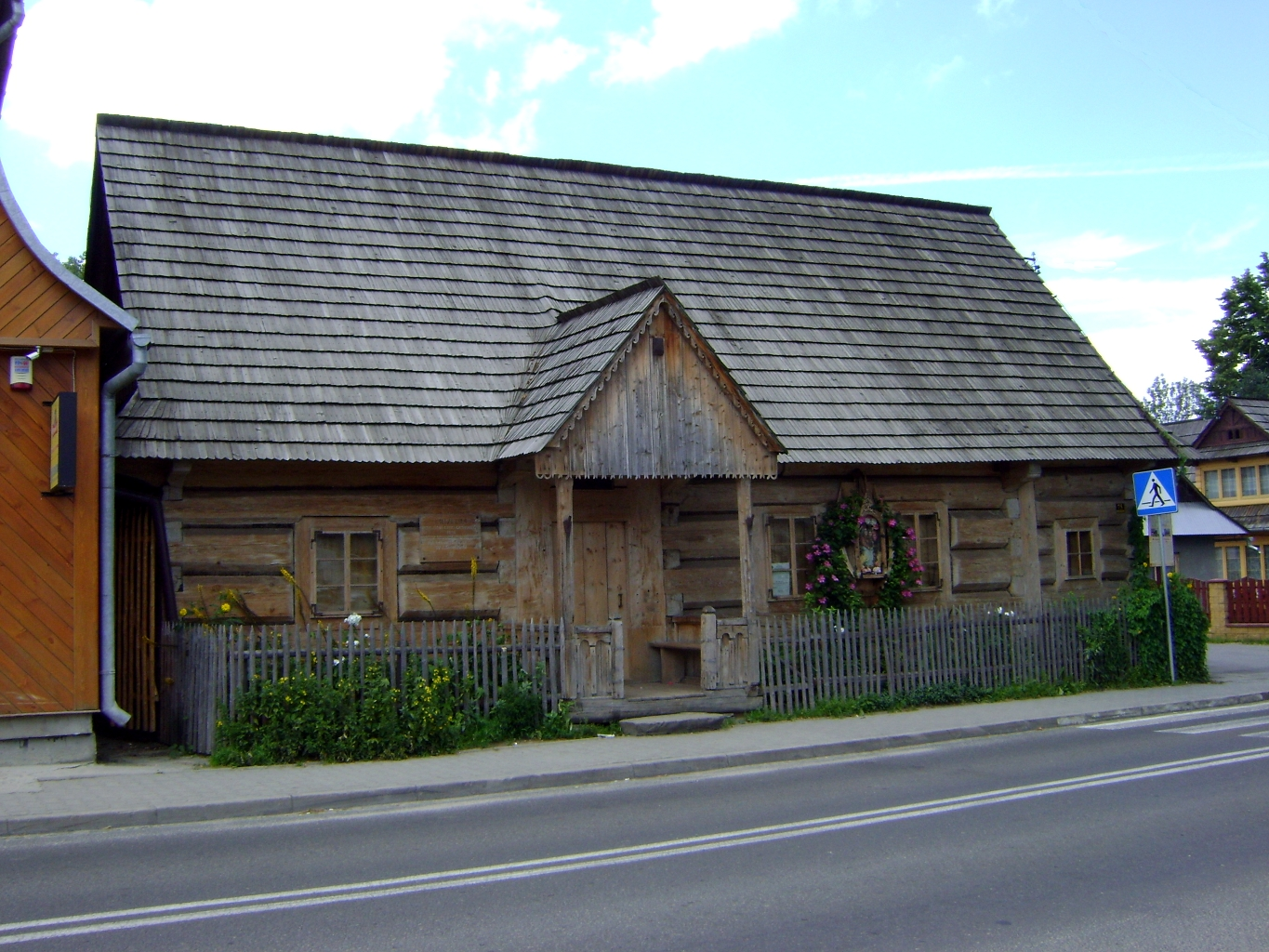
Chochołów Uprising Museum

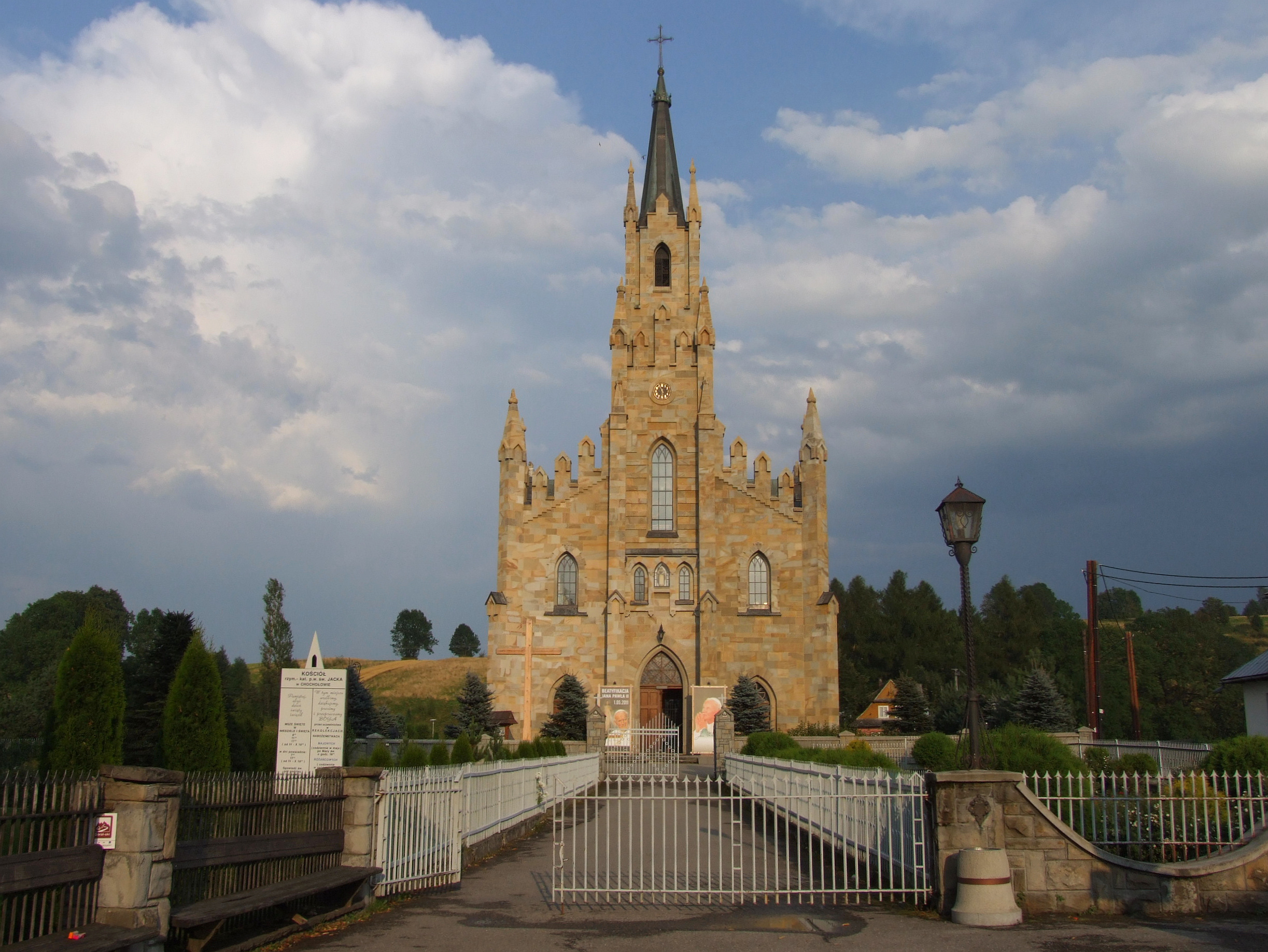
Saint Hyacinth church

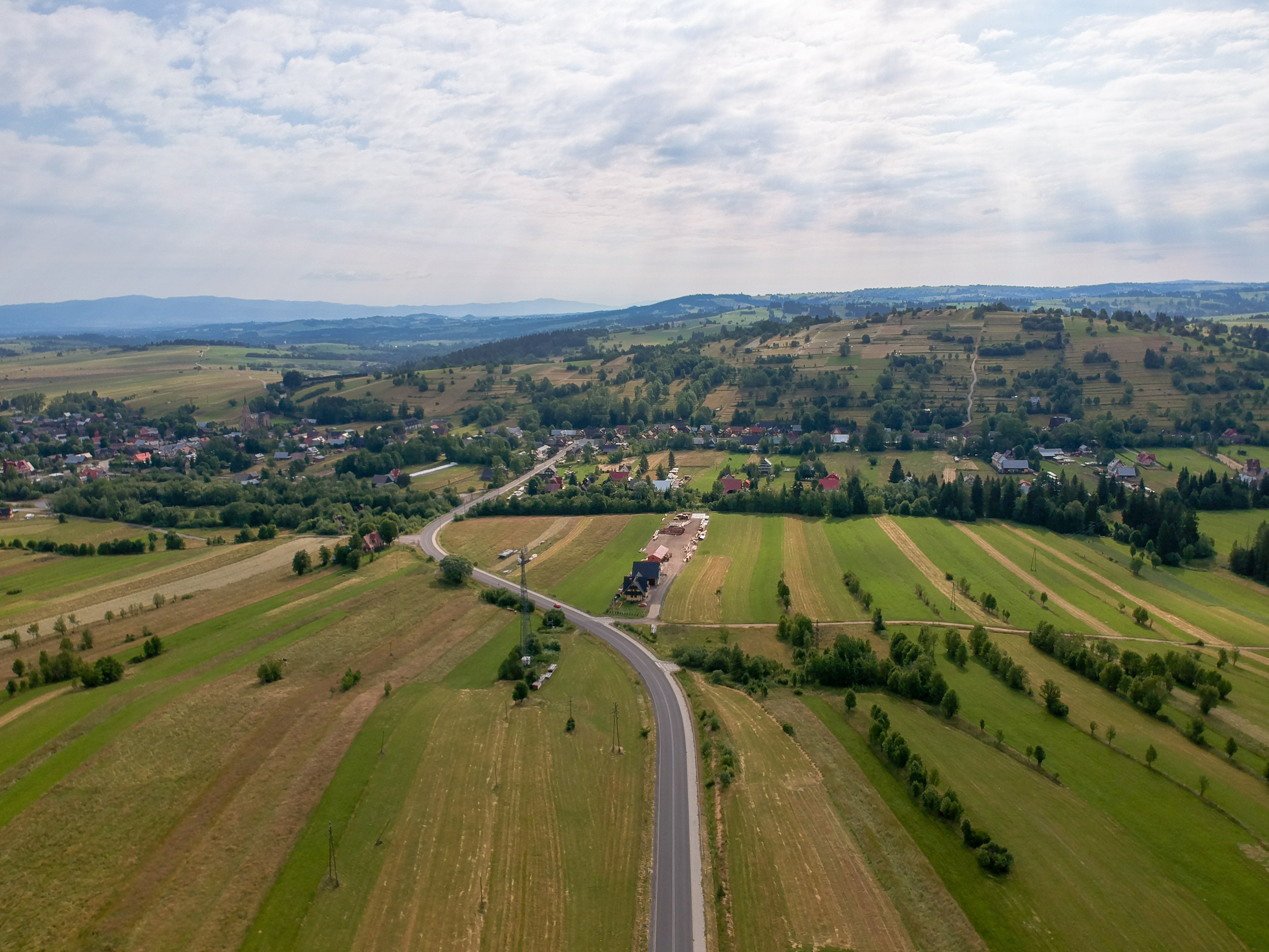
Aerial view

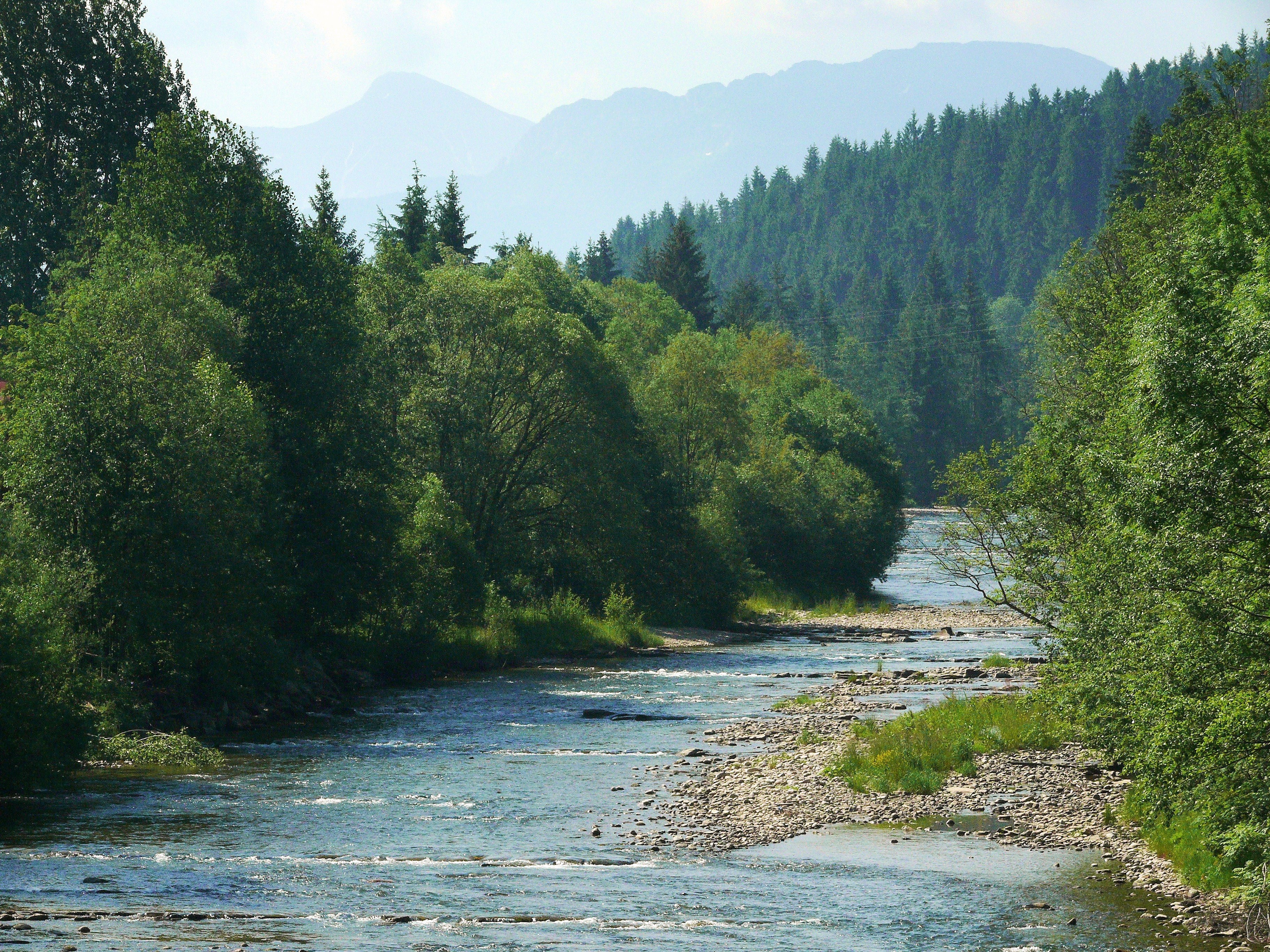
Czarny Dunajec river in Chochołów
