= Gmina Spytkowice, Nowy Targ County =

Gmina Spytkowice Spytkowice Commune
- Gmina
- Coat of arms
- Interactive map of Gmina Spytkowice
- Coordinates (Spytkowice): 49°34′35″N 19°49′7″E
- Country: Poland
- Voivodeship: Lesser Poland
- County: Nowy Targ
- Seat: Spytkowice

Area
  - Total: 32.19 km^{2} (12.43 sq mi)

Population (2006)
  - Total: 3,979
  - Density: 123.6/km^{2} (320.1/sq mi)
- Website: www.spytkowice.pl

Gmina Spytkowice is a rural gmina (administrative district) in Nowy Targ County, Lesser Poland Voivodeship, in southern Poland. Its seat is the village of Spytkowice, which lies approximately 19 kilometres (12 mi) north-west of Nowy Targ and 55 km (34 mi) south of the regional capital Kraków.

The gmina covers an area of 32.19 square kilometres (12.4 sq mi), and as of 2006 its total population is 3,979.

== Neighbouring gminas ==
Gmina Spytkowice is bordered by the gminas of Bystra-Sidzina, Jabłonka, Jordanów and Raba Wyżna.
