= Gmina Czarny Dunajec =

Gmina Czarny Dunajec Czarny Dunajec Commune
- Gmina
- Flag Coat of arms

- Location of Gmina Czarny Dunajec in Nowy Targ County.

- Location of Gmina Czarny Dunajec in Lesser Poland Voivodeship. Gmina Czarny Dunajec (Lesser Poland Voivodeship)
- Coordinates (Czarny Dunajec): 49°26′22″N 19°51′15″E
- Country: Poland
- Voivodeship: Lesser Poland
- County: Nowy Targ
- Seat: Czarny Dunajec

Government
  - Wójt: Marcin Ratułowski

Area
  - Total: 218.34 km^{2} (84.30 sq mi)

Population (2020)
  - Total: 22,592
  - Density: 103.47/km^{2} (268.0/sq mi)
- Website: http://www.czarny-dunajec.pl

Gmina Czarny Dunajec is a rural gmina (administrative district) in Nowy Targ County, Lesser Poland Voivodeship, in southern Poland, on the Slovak border. Its seat is the town of Czarny Dunajec, which lies approximately 13 kilometres (8 mi) west of Nowy Targ and 70 km (43 mi) south of the regional capital Kraków.

The gmina covers an area of 218.34 square kilometres (84.3 sq mi), and as of 2020 its total population is 22,592.

== Villages ==
Gmina Czarny Dunajec contains the villages and settlements of Chochołów, Ciche, Czarny Dunajec, Czerwienne, Dział, Koniówka, Odrowąż, Piekielnik, Pieniążkowice, Podczerwone, Podszkle, Ratułów, Stare Bystre, Wróblówka and Załuczne.

== Neighbouring gminas ==
Gmina Czarny Dunajec is bordered by the gminas of Biały Dunajec, Jabłonka, Kościelisko, Nowy Targ, Poronin, Raba Wyżna and Szaflary. It also borders Slovakia.
