= Koniówka =

- Village
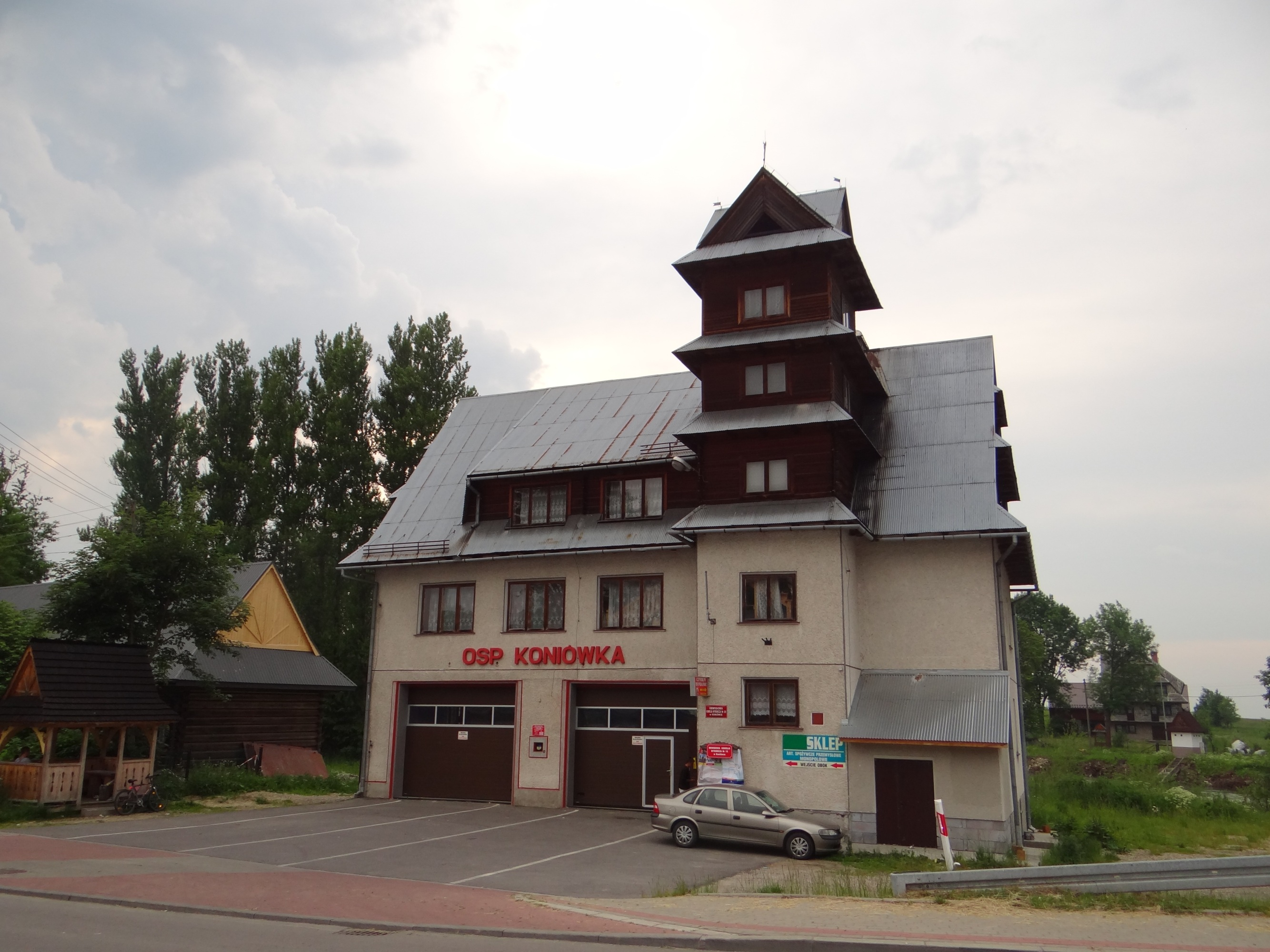
- Fire station

- Coat of arms

- Location within Poland
- Coordinates: 49°24′N 19°50′E
- Country: Poland
- Voivodeship: Lesser Poland
- County: Nowy Targ
- Gmina: Czarny Dunajec

Population (approx.)
  - Total: 380

Koniówka [kɔˈɲufka] is a village in the administrative district of Gmina Czarny Dunajec, within Nowy Targ County, Lesser Poland Voivodeship, in southern Poland, close to the border with Slovakia.

The village has an approximate population of 380.
