= Czarny Dunajec =

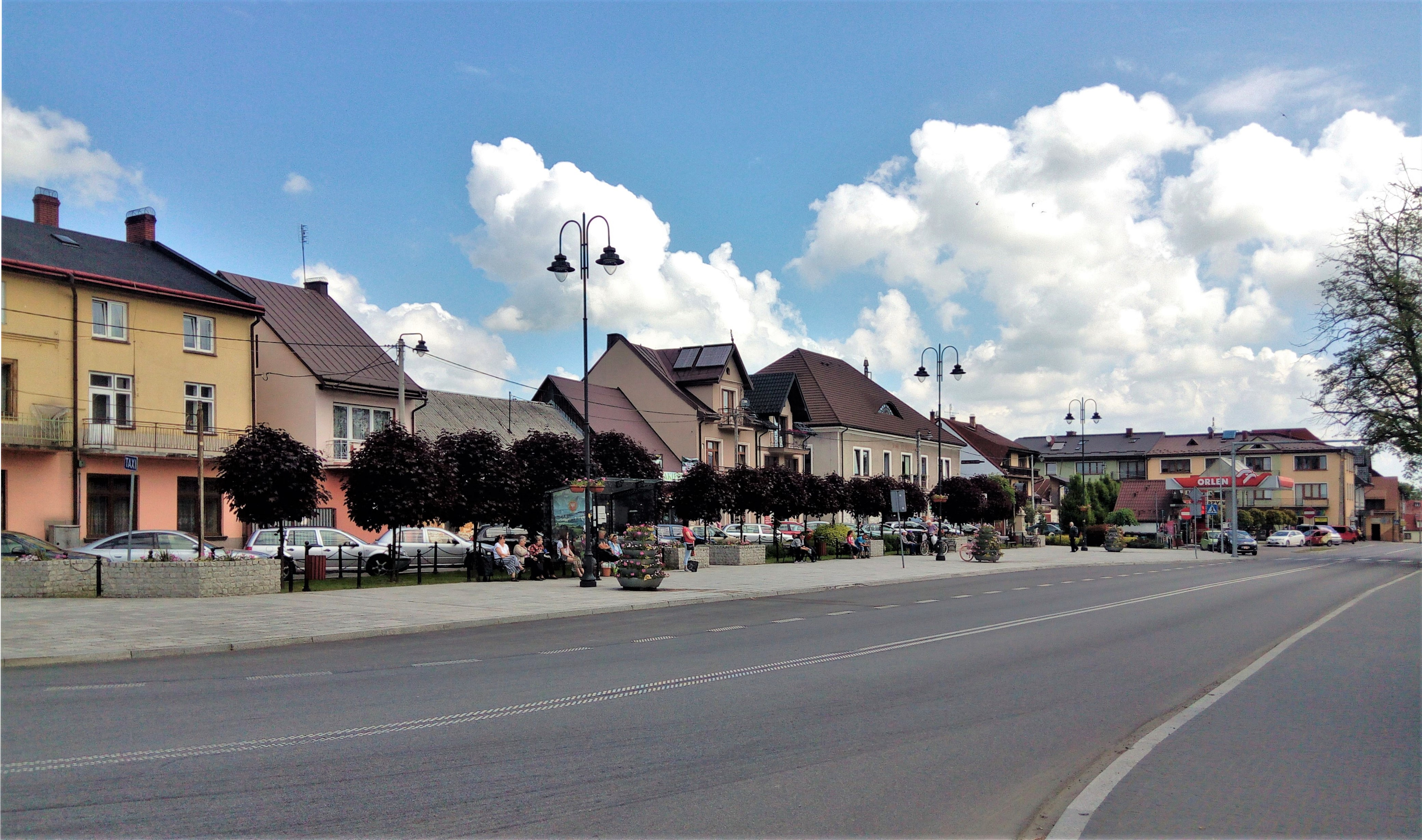
- Rynek (Market Square)

- Flag Coat of arms

- Location within Poland
- Coordinates: 49°26′22″N 19°51′15″E
- Country: Poland
- Voivodeship: Lesser Poland
- County: Nowy Targ
- Gmina: Czarny Dunajec
- Founded: 1230s

Area
  - Total: 21.72 km^{2} (8.39 sq mi)

Population
  - Total: 3,501
  - Density: 161.2/km^{2} (417.5/sq mi)
- Time zone: UTC+1 (CET)
  - Summer (DST): UTC+2 (CEST)
- Postal code: 34-470
- Area code: +48 18
- Car plates: KNT

Czarny Dunajec [ˈt͡ʂarnɨ duˈnajɛt͡s] is a town located in southern Poland near the Polish-Slovak border in a valley alongside a river of the same name.

Czarny Dunajec is the seat of the gmina, belonging to the Nowy Targ County (Polish: Powiat Nowotarski) and in the Lesser Poland.

== History ==
Czarny Dunajec was founded around 1234. The local Catholic church was founded by starost of Nowy Targ Jan Pieniążek, his wife Zofia Pieniążkowa, sołtys Tomasz Miętus and first parish priest Szymon Bukowiński.

Following the joint German-Soviet invasion of Poland, which started World War II in September 1939, Czarny Dunajec was occupied by Germany until 1945. From late 1940 to January 1943, the Germans operated a forced labour camp for Jews in the town. On May 20, 1942, the Gestapo executed two Jews and one Pole as punishment for aiding Jews.

== Transportation and tourism ==
Czarny Dunajec is about 60 miles south of Kraków with its international airport. The nearest railway station is in Nowy Targ.

The town is on intersection of the east-west and north-south voievodship roads, that are one of main ways to the Western Tatra and Zakopane mountain region as well as the nearby Chocholow thermal spa.

A local railway line through the valley was dismantled and converted to a cycling path.

Important peatlands are situated to the west and north-west of the town. Czarny Dunajec and Piekielnik were declared as a protected spa area by the Polish government in 2016.
