= Nowy Targ County =

Nowy Targ County Powiat nowotarski
- County
- Flag Coat of arms

- Location within the voivodeship

- Location of Nowy Targ County in Lesser Poland Voivodeship. Nowy Targ County (Lesser Poland Voivodeship)
- Coordinates (Nowy Targ): 49°28′N 20°1′E
- Country: Poland
- Voivodeship: Lesser Poland
- Seat: Nowy Targ
- Gminas: Total 14 (incl. 1 urban): Nowy Targ; Gmina Szczawnica; Gmina Czarny Dunajec; Gmina Czorsztyn; Gmina Jabłonka; Gmina Krościenko nad Dunajcem; Gmina Łapsze Niżne; Gmina Lipnica Wielka; Gmina Nowy Targ; Gmina Ochotnica Dolna; Gmina Raba Wyżna; Gmina Rabka-Zdrój; Gmina Spytkowice; Gmina Szaflary

Area
  - Total: 1,474.66 km^{2} (569.37 sq mi)

Population (2006)
  - Total: 181,878
  - Density: 123.336/km^{2} (319.438/sq mi)
  - Urban: 53,858
  - Rural: 128,020
- Car plates: KNT
- Website: www.nowotarski.pl

Nowy Targ County (Polish: powiat nowotarski) is a unit of territorial administration and local government (powiat) in Lesser Poland Voivodeship, southern Poland, on the Slovak border. It came into being on January 1, 1999, as a result of the Polish local government reforms passed in 1998. Its administrative seat and largest town is Nowy Targ, which lies 67 kilometres (42 mi) south of the regional capital Kraków. The county also contains the towns of Rabka-Zdrój, lying 18 km (11 mi) north of Nowy Targ, and Szczawnica, 35 km (22 mi) east of Nowy Targ.

The county covers an area of 1,474.66 square kilometres (569.4 sq mi). As of 2006 its total population is 181,878, out of which the population of Nowy Targ is 33,493, that of Rabka-Zdrój is 13,031, that of Szczawnica is 7,334, and the rural population is 128,020.

== Neighbouring counties ==
Nowy Targ County is bordered by Sucha County to the north-west, Myślenice County to the north, Limanowa County to the north-east, Nowy Sącz County to the east and Tatra County to the south. It also borders Slovakia to the south.

== Administrative division ==
The county is subdivided into 14 gminas (one urban, three urban-rural and 10 rural). These are listed in the following table, in descending order of population.

Gmina	Type	Area (km^{2})	Population (2006)	Seat
Nowy Targ	urban	51.1	33,493	
Gmina Nowy Targ	rural	208.7	22,070	Nowy Targ *
Gmina Czarny Dunajec	urban-rural	218.3	21,186	Czarny Dunajec
Gmina Rabka-Zdrój	urban-rural	69.0	17,190	Rabka-Zdrój
Gmina Jabłonka	rural	213.3	16,910	Jabłonka
Gmina Raba Wyżna	rural	88.3	13,525	Raba Wyżna
Gmina Szaflary	rural	54.3	10,227	Szaflary
Gmina Łapsze Niżne	rural	124.8	8,785	Łapsze Niżne
Gmina Ochotnica Dolna	rural	141.0	7,921	Ochotnica Dolna
Gmina Szczawnica	urban-rural	87.9	7,334	Szczawnica
Gmina Czorsztyn	rural	61.7	7,201	Maniowy
Gmina Krościenko nad Dunajcem	rural	57.3	6,465	Krościenko nad Dunajcem
Gmina Lipnica Wielka	rural	67.5	5,592	Lipnica Wielka
Gmina Spytkowice	rural	32.2	3,979	Spytkowice
* seat not part of the gmina
