= 2022 Tour de Pologne =

79th Tour de Pologne road cycling race

2022 UCI World Tour, race 25 of 31

Race details
- Dates: 30 July–5 August 2022
- Stages: 7
- Distance: 1,209.4 km (751.5 mi)
- Winning time: 28h 26' 23"

Results
Jersey awarded to the overall winner	Winner	Ethan Hayter (GBR)	(Ineos Grenadiers)
	Second	Thymen Arensman (NED)	(Team DSM)
	Third	Pello Bilbao (ESP)	(Team Bahrain Victorious)
Jersey awarded to the mountains classification winner	Mountains	Jarrad Drizners (AUS)	(Lotto–Soudal)
Jersey awarded to the sprints classification winner	Sprints	Arnaud Démare (FRA)	(Groupama–FDJ)
Jersey awarded to the combativity classification winner	Combativity	Patryk Stosz (POL)	(Poland)
	Team	Ineos Grenadiers	

The 2022 Tour de Pologne was the 79th edition of the Tour de Pologne road cycling stage race, which was part of the 2022 UCI World Tour. It started on 30 July in Kielce and finished on 5 August in Kraków.

== Teams ==
All eighteen UCI WorldTeams, four UCI ProTeams, and the Polish national team made up the twenty-three teams that participated in the race.

UCI WorldTeams

- AG2R Citroën Team
- Astana Qazaqstan Team
- Bora–Hansgrohe
- Cofidis
- EF Education–EasyPost
- Groupama–FDJ
- Ineos Grenadiers
- Intermarché–Wanty–Gobert Matériaux
- Israel–Premier Tech
- Lotto–Soudal
- Movistar Team
- Quick-Step Alpha Vinyl Team
- Team Bahrain Victorious
- Team BikeExchange–Jayco
- Team DSM
- Team Jumbo–Visma
- Trek–Segafredo
- UAE Team Emirates

UCI ProTeams

- Alpecin–Deceuninck
- Caja Rural–Seguros RGA
- Team Novo Nordisk
- Uno-X Pro Cycling Team

National Teams

- Poland

== Schedule ==
Stage characteristics and winners
Stage	Date	Course	Distance	Type	Stage winner
1	30 July	Kielce to Lublin	218.8 km (136.0 mi)	Flat stage	Olav Kooij (NED)
2	31 July	Chełm to Zamość	205.6 km (127.8 mi)	Flat stage	Gerben Thijssen (BEL)
3	1 August	Kraśnik to Przemyśl	237.9 km (147.8 mi)	Medium-mountain stage	Sergio Higuita (COL)
4	2 August	Lesko to Sanok	179.4 km (111.5 mi)	Medium-mountain stage	Pascal Ackermann (GER)
5	3 August	Łańcut to Rzeszów	178.1 km (110.7 mi)	Hilly stage	Phil Bauhaus (GER)
6	4 August	Nowy Targ, Gronków to Bukovina Resort	11.8 km (7.3 mi)	Individual time trial	Thymen Arensman (NED)
7	5 August	Skawina to Kraków	177.8 km (110.5 mi)	Hilly stage	Arnaud Démare (FRA)
Total			1,209.4 km (751.5 mi)		

== Stages ==
=== Stage 1 ===
30 July 2022 – Kielce to Lublin, 218.8 km (136.0 mi)

Stage 1 Result
Rank	Rider	Team	Time
1	Olav Kooij (NED)	Team Jumbo–Visma	5h 18' 01"
2	Phil Bauhaus (GER)	Team Bahrain Victorious	+ 0"
3	Jordi Meeus (BEL)	Israel–Premier Tech	+ 0"
4	Mike Teunissen (NED)	Trek–Segafredo	+ 0"
5	Juan Sebastián Molano (COL)	UAE Team Emirates	+ 0"
6	Max Kanter (GER)	Movistar Team	+ 0"
7	Kaden Groves (AUS)	Team BikeExchange–Jayco	+ 0"
8	Mark Cavendish (GBR)	Quick-Step Alpha Vinyl Team	+ 0"
9	Arnaud Démare (FRA)	Groupama–FDJ	+ 0"
10	Tobias Bayer (AUT)	Alpecin–Deceuninck	+ 0"

General classification after Stage 1
Rank	Rider	Team	Time
1	Olav Kooij (NED)	Team Jumbo–Visma	5h 17' 51"
2	Phil Bauhaus (GER)	Team Bahrain Victorious	+ 4"
3	Jonas Abrahamsen (NOR)	Uno-X Pro Cycling Team	+ 4"
4	Jordi Meeus (BEL)	Israel–Premier Tech	+ 6"
5	Mike Teunissen (NED)	Trek–Segafredo	+ 10"
6	Juan Sebastián Molano (COL)	UAE Team Emirates	+ 10"
7	Max Kanter (GER)	Movistar Team	+ 10"
8	Kaden Groves (AUS)	Team BikeExchange–Jayco	+ 10"
9	Mark Cavendish (GBR)	Quick-Step Alpha Vinyl Team	+ 10"
10	Arnaud Démare (FRA)	Groupama–FDJ	+ 10"

=== Stage 2 ===
31 July 2022 – Chełm to Zamość, 205.6 km (127.8 mi)

Stage 2 Result
Rank	Rider	Team	Time
1	Gerben Thijssen (BEL)	Intermarché–Wanty–Gobert Matériaux	4h 47' 23"
2	Pascal Ackermann (GER)	UAE Team Emirates	+ 0"
3	Jonathan Milan (ITA)	Team Bahrain Victorious	+ 0"
4	Olav Kooij (NED)	Team Jumbo–Visma	+ 0"
5	Sam Bennett (IRL)	Bora–Hansgrohe	+ 0"
6	Arnaud Démare (FRA)	Groupama–FDJ	+ 0"
7	Elia Viviani (ITA)	Ineos Grenadiers	+ 0"
8	Max Kanter (GER)	Movistar Team	+ 0"
9	Marijn van den Berg (NED)	EF Education–EasyPost	+ 0"
10	Mark Cavendish (GBR)	Quick-Step Alpha Vinyl Team	+ 0"

General classification after Stage 2
Rank	Rider	Team	Time
1	Jonas Abrahamsen (NOR)	Uno-X Pro Cycling Team	10h 05' 12"
2	Olav Kooij (NED)	Team Jumbo–Visma	+ 2"
3	Gerben Thijssen (BEL)	Intermarché–Wanty–Gobert Matériaux	+ 2"
4	Pascal Ackermann (GER)	UAE Team Emirates	+ 6"
5	Phil Bauhaus (GER)	Team Bahrain Victorious	+ 6"
6	Jordi Meeus (BEL)	Bora–Hansgrohe	+ 8"
7	Jonathan Milan (ITA)	Team Bahrain Victorious	+ 8"
8	Jasper De Buyst (BEL)	Lotto–Soudal	+ 8"
9	Sam Brand (GBR)	Team Novo Nordisk	+ 11"
10	Max Kanter (GER)	Movistar Team	+ 12"

=== Stage 3 ===
1 August 2022 – Kraśnik to Przemyśl, 237.9 km (147.8 mi)

Stage 3 Result
Rank	Rider	Team	Time
1	Sergio Higuita (COL)	Bora–Hansgrohe	5h 25' 46"
2	Pello Bilbao (ESP)	Team Bahrain Victorious	+ 0"
3	Quinten Hermans (BEL)	Intermarché–Wanty–Gobert Matériaux	+ 0"
4	Matteo Sobrero (ITA)	Team BikeExchange–Jayco	+ 0"
5	Quentin Pacher (FRA)	Groupama–FDJ	+ 0"
6	Mauro Schmid (SUI)	Quick-Step Alpha Vinyl Team	+ 0"
7	Felix Gall (AUT)	AG2R Citroën Team	+ 0"
8	Stephen Williams (GBR)	Team Bahrain Victorious	+ 0"
9	Lucas Hamilton (AUS)	Team BikeExchange–Jayco	+ 0"
10	Diego Ulissi (ITA)	UAE Team Emirates	+ 0"

General classification after Stage 3
Rank	Rider	Team	Time
1	Sergio Higuita (COL)	Bora–Hansgrohe	15h 31' 00"
2	Pello Bilbao (ESP)	Team Bahrain Victorious	+ 4"
3	Quinten Hermans (BEL)	Intermarché–Wanty–Gobert Matériaux	+ 6"
4	Ethan Hayter (GBR)	Ineos Grenadiers	+ 10"
5	Diego Ulissi (ITA)	UAE Team Emirates	+ 10"
6	Matteo Sobrero (ITA)	Team BikeExchange–Jayco	+ 10"
7	Richard Carapaz (ECU)	Ineos Grenadiers	+ 10"
8	Mauro Schmid (SUI)	Quick-Step Alpha Vinyl Team	+ 10"
9	Quentin Pacher (FRA)	Groupama–FDJ	+ 10"
10	Lucas Hamilton (AUS)	Team BikeExchange–Jayco	+ 10"

=== Stage 4 ===
2 August 2022 – Lesko to Sanok, 179.4 km (111.5 mi)

Stage 4 Result
Rank	Rider	Team	Time
1	Pascal Ackermann (GER)	UAE Team Emirates	4h 21' 26"
2	Jordi Meeus (BEL)	Bora–Hansgrohe	+ 0"
3	Jonathan Milan (ITA)	Team Bahrain Victorious	+ 0"
4	Quinten Hermans (BEL)	Intermarché–Wanty–Gobert Matériaux	+ 0"
5	Olav Kooij (NED)	Team Jumbo–Visma	+ 0"
6	Cristian Scaroni (ITA)	Astana Qazaqstan Team	+ 0"
7	Diego Ulissi (ITA)	UAE Team Emirates	+ 0"
8	Quentin Pacher (FRA)	Groupama–FDJ	+ 0"
9	Stanislaw Aniolkowski (POL)	Poland	+ 0"
10	Nikias Arndt (GER)	Team DSM	+ 0"

General classification after Stage 4
Rank	Rider	Team	Time
1	Sergio Higuita (COL)	Bora–Hansgrohe	19h 52' 46"
2	Pello Bilbao (ESP)	Team Bahrain Victorious	+ 4"
3	Quinten Hermans (BEL)	Intermarché–Wanty–Gobert Matériaux	+ 6"
4	Diego Ulissi (ITA)	UAE Team Emirates	+ 10"
5	Matteo Sobrero (ITA)	Team BikeExchange–Jayco	+ 10"
6	Richard Carapaz (ECU)	Ineos Grenadiers	+ 10"
7	Mauro Schmid (SUI)	Quick-Step Alpha Vinyl Team	+ 10"
8	Ethan Hayter (GBR)	Ineos Grenadiers	+ 10"
9	Quentin Pacher (FRA)	Groupama–FDJ	+ 10"
10	Felix Gall (AUT)	AG2R Citroën Team	+ 10"

=== Stage 5 ===
3 August 2022 – Łańcut to Rzeszów, 178.1 km (110.7 mi)

Stage 5 Result
Rank	Rider	Team	Time
1	Phil Bauhaus (GER)	Team Bahrain Victorious	4h 16' 19"
2	Arnaud Démare (FRA)	Groupama–FDJ	+ 0"
3	Nikias Arndt (GER)	Team DSM	+ 0"
4	Max Kanter (GER)	Movistar Team	+ 0"
5	Edward Theuns (BEL)	Trek–Segafredo	+ 0"
6	Jonathan Milan (ITA)	Team Bahrain Victorious	+ 0"
7	Hugo Page (FRA)	Intermarché–Wanty–Gobert Matériaux	+ 0"
8	Ryan Mullen (IRL)	Bora–Hansgrohe	+ 0"
9	Jacopo Guarnieri (ITA)	Groupama–FDJ	+ 0"
10	Patryk Stosz (POL)	Poland	+ 0"

General classification after Stage 5
Rank	Rider	Team	Time
1	Sergio Higuita (COL)	Bora–Hansgrohe	24h 09' 05"
2	Pello Bilbao (ESP)	Team Bahrain Victorious	+ 4"
3	Quinten Hermans (BEL)	Intermarché–Wanty–Gobert Matériaux	+ 6"
4	Diego Ulissi (ITA)	UAE Team Emirates	+ 10"
5	Matteo Sobrero (ITA)	Team BikeExchange–Jayco	+ 10"
6	Richard Carapaz (ECU)	Ineos Grenadiers	+ 10"
7	Ethan Hayter (GBR)	Ineos Grenadiers	+ 10"
8	Quentin Pacher (FRA)	Groupama–FDJ	+ 10"
9	Lucas Hamilton (AUS)	Team BikeExchange–Jayco	+ 10"
10	Steff Cras (BEL)	Lotto–Soudal	+ 10"

=== Stage 6 ===
4 August 2022 – Nowy Targ, Gronków to Bukovina Resort, 11.8 km (7.3 mi) (ITT)

Stage 6 Result
Rank	Rider	Team	Time
1	Thymen Arensman (NED)	Team DSM	17' 40"
2	Magnus Sheffield (USA)	Ineos Grenadiers	+ 7"
3	Ethan Hayter (GBR)	Ineos Grenadiers	+ 8"
4	Remi Cavagna (FRA)	Quick-Step Alpha Vinyl Team	+ 20"
5	Marco Brenner (GER)	Team DSM	+ 26"
6	Ben Tulett (GBR)	Ineos Grenadiers	+ 28"
7	Samuele Battistella (ITA)	Astana Qazaqstan Team	+ 30"
8	Matteo Sobrero (ITA)	Team BikeExchange–Jayco	+ 31"
9	Pello Bilbao (ESP)	Team Bahrain Victorious	+ 32"
10	Mark Padun (UKR)	EF Education–EasyPost	+ 35"

General classification after Stage 6
Rank	Rider	Team	Time
1	Ethan Hayter (GBR)	Ineos Grenadiers	24h 27' 03"
2	Thymen Arensman (NED)	Team DSM	+ 11"
3	Pello Bilbao (ESP)	Team Bahrain Victorious	+ 18"
4	Matteo Sobrero (ITA)	Team BikeExchange–Jayco	+ 23"
5	Ben Tulett (GBR)	Ineos Grenadiers	+ 25"
6	Remi Cavagna (FRA)	Quick-Step Alpha Vinyl Team	+ 31"
7	Samuele Battistella (ITA)	Astana Qazaqstan Team	+ 32"
8	Sergio Higuita (COL)	Bora–Hansgrohe	+ 32"
9	Diego Ulissi (ITA)	UAE Team Emirates	+ 45"
10	Bruno Armirail (FRA)	Groupama–FDJ	+ 50"

=== Stage 7 ===
5 August 2022 – Skawina to Kraków, 177.8 km (110.5 mi)

Stage 7 Result
Rank	Rider	Team	Time
1	Arnaud Démare (FRA)	Groupama–FDJ	3h 59' 20"
2	Olav Kooij (NED)	Team Jumbo–Visma	+ 0"
3	Phil Bauhaus (GER)	Team Bahrain Victorious	+ 0"
4	Max Kanter (GER)	Movistar Team	+ 0"
5	Gerben Thijssen (BEL)	Intermarché–Wanty–Gobert Matériaux	+ 0"
6	Marijn van den Berg (NED)	EF Education–EasyPost	+ 0"
7	Davide Cimolai (ITA)	Cofidis	+ 0"
8	Edward Theuns (BEL)	Trek–Segafredo	+ 0"
9	Pascal Ackermann (GER)	UAE Team Emirates	+ 0"
10	Kaden Groves (AUS)	Team BikeExchange–Jayco	+ 0"

Final general classification
Rank	Rider	Team	Time
1	Ethan Hayter (GBR)	Ineos Grenadiers	28h 26' 23"
2	Thymen Arensman (NED)	Team DSM	+ 11"
3	Pello Bilbao (ESP)	Team Bahrain Victorious	+ 18"
4	Matteo Sobrero (ITA)	Team BikeExchange–Jayco	+ 23"
5	Ben Tulett (GBR)	Ineos Grenadiers	+ 25"
6	Remi Cavagna (FRA)	Quick-Step Alpha Vinyl Team	+ 31"
7	Samuele Battistella (ITA)	Astana Qazaqstan Team	+ 32"
8	Sergio Higuita (COL)	Bora–Hansgrohe	+ 32"
9	Diego Ulissi (ITA)	UAE Team Emirates	+ 45"
10	Bruno Armirail (FRA)	Groupama–FDJ	+ 50"

== Classification leadership table ==
Classification leadership by stage
Stage	Winner	General classification (Polish: Żółta koszulka)	Sprints classification (Polish: Klasyfikacja sprinterska)	Mountains classification (Polish: Klasyfikacja górska)	Active rider classification (Polish: Klasyfikacja najaktywniejszych)	Polish rider classification (Polish: Najlepszy Polak)	Team classification (Polish: Klasyfikacja drużynowa)
1	Olav Kooij	Olav Kooij	Olav Kooij (Note: On stage 2, Phil Bauhaus, who was second in the sprints classification, wore the white jersey, because first-placed Olav Kooij wore the yellow jersey as the leader of the general classification.)	Jonas Abrahamsen (Note: On stage 3, Piotr Brożyna, who was second in the mountains classification, wore the polka-dot jersey, because first-placed Jonas Abrahamsen wore the yellow jersey as the leader of the general classification.)	Patryk Stosz	Stanislaw Aniolkowski	AG2R Citroën Team
2	Gerben Thijssen	Jonas Abrahamsen	Olav Kooij	Jonas Abrahamsen	Patryk Stosz	Stanislaw Aniolkowski	UAE Team Emirates
3	Sergio Higuita	Sergio Higuita	Olav Kooij	Michel Hessmann	Patryk Stosz	Jakub Kaczmarek	Ineos Grenadiers
4	Pascal Ackermann	Sergio Higuita	Olav Kooij	Kamil Malecki	Patryk Stosz	Jakub Kaczmarek	Ineos Grenadiers
5	Phil Bauhaus	Sergio Higuita	Arnaud Démare	Kamil Malecki	Patryk Stosz	Jakub Kaczmarek	Ineos Grenadiers
6	Thymen Arensman	Ethan Hayter	Arnaud Démare	Kamil Malecki	Patryk Stosz	Jakub Kaczmarek	Ineos Grenadiers
7	Arnaud Démare	Ethan Hayter	Arnaud Démare	Jarrad Drizners	Patryk Stosz	Jakub Kaczmarek	Ineos Grenadiers
Final		Ethan Hayter	Arnaud Démare	Jarrad Drizners	Patryk Stosz	Jakub Kaczmarek	Ineos Grenadiers

== Final classification standings ==
Legend
Denotes the winner of the general classification	Denotes the winner of the mountains classification
Denotes the winner of the sprints classification	Denotes the winner of the active rider classification

=== General classification ===
Final general classification (1–10)
Rank	Rider	Team	Time
1	Ethan Hayter (GBR)	Ineos Grenadiers	28h 26' 23"
2	Thymen Arensman (NED)	Team DSM	+ 11"
3	Pello Bilbao (ESP)	Team Bahrain Victorious	+ 18"
4	Matteo Sobrero (ITA)	Team BikeExchange–Jayco	+ 23"
5	Ben Tulett (GBR)	Ineos Grenadiers	+ 25"
6	Remi Cavagna (FRA)	Quick-Step Alpha Vinyl Team	+ 31"
7	Samuele Battistella (ITA)	Astana Qazaqstan Team	+ 32"
8	Sergio Higuita (COL)	Bora–Hansgrohe	+ 32"
9	Diego Ulissi (ITA)	UAE Team Emirates	+ 45"
10	Bruno Armirail (FRA)	Groupama–FDJ	+ 50"

=== Sprints classification ===
Final sprints classification (1–10)
Rank	Rider	Team	Points
1	Arnaud Démare (FRA)	Groupama–FDJ	74
2	Olav Kooij (NED)	Team Jumbo–Visma	72
3	Max Kanter (GER)	Movistar Team	62
4	Phil Bauhaus (GER)	Team Bahrain Victorious	57
5	Pascal Ackermann (GER)	UAE Team Emirates	51
6	Jonathan Milan (ITA)	Team Bahrain Victorious	51
7	Gerben Thijssen (BEL)	Intermarché–Wanty–Gobert Matériaux	42
8	Ethan Hayter (GBR)	Ineos Grenadiers	42
9	Pello Bilbao (ESP)	Team Bahrain Victorious	40
10	Nikias Arndt (GER)	Team DSM	39

=== Mountains classification ===
Final mountains classification (1–10)
Rank	Rider	Team	Points
1	Jarrad Drizners (AUS)	Lotto–Soudal	23
2	Alessandro De Marchi (ITA)	Israel–Premier Tech	16
3	Kamil Malecki (POL)	Lotto–Soudal	15
4	Michel Hessmann (GER)	Team Jumbo–Visma	11
5	Syver Wærsted (NOR)	Uno-X Pro Cycling Team	11
6	Rui Oliveira (POR)	UAE Team Emirates	8
7	Mads Würtz Schmidt (DEN)	Israel–Premier Tech	7
8	Julius Johansen (DEN)	Intermarché–Wanty–Gobert Matériaux	7
9	Nans Peters (FRA)	AG2R Citroën Team	5
10	Felix Gall (AUT)	AG2R Citroën Team	4

=== Active rider classification ===
Final active rider classification (1–10)
Rank	Rider	Team	Points
1	Patryk Stosz (POL)	Poland	16
2	Edward Theuns (BEL)	Trek–Segafredo	8
3	Mads Würtz Schmidt (DEN)	Israel–Premier Tech	6
4	Alessandro De Marchi (ITA)	Israel–Premier Tech	6
5	Marcin Budziński (POL)	Poland	5
6	Piotr Brożyna (POL)	Poland	4
7	Sean Quinn (USA)	EF Education–EasyPost	3
8	Nans Peters (FRA)	AG2R Citroën Team	3
9	Jarrad Drizners (AUS)	Lotto–Soudal	3
10	Syver Wærsted (NOR)	Uno-X Pro Cycling Team	3

=== Team classification ===
Final team classification (1–10)
Rank	Team	Time
1	Ineos Grenadiers	85h 19' 33"
2	Quick-Step Alpha Vinyl Team	+ 2' 43"
3	Team DSM	+ 2' 46"
4	EF Education–EasyPost	+ 2' 48"
5	Team Bahrain Victorious	+ 3' 56"
6	AG2R Citroën Team	+ 4' 20"
7	Team BikeExchange–Jayco	+ 4' 22"
8	Astana Qazaqstan Team	+ 4' 41"
9	Israel–Premier Tech	+ 5' 51"
10	Movistar Team	+ 5' 56"
