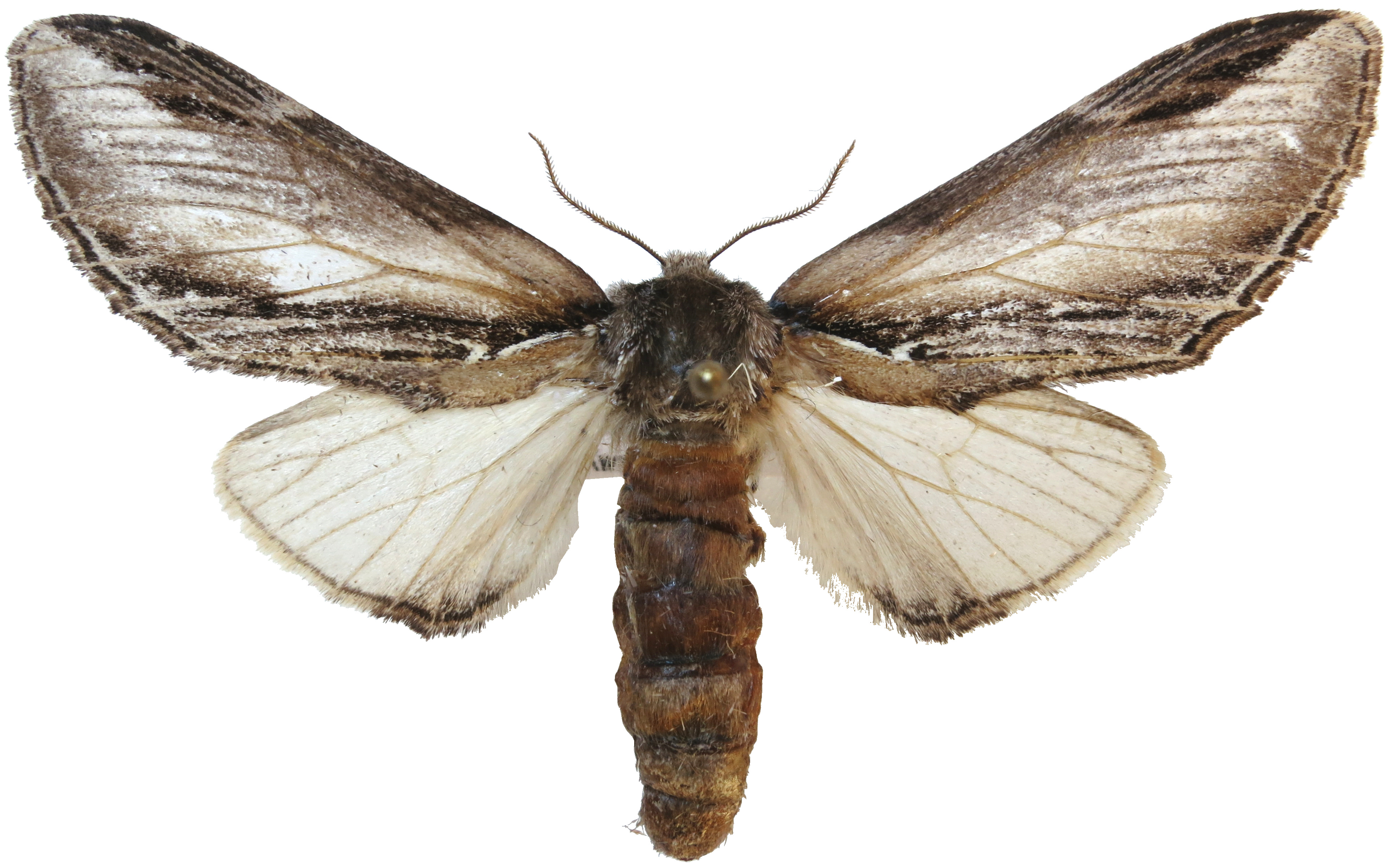
- P. tremula femelle - Dursztyn, Poland
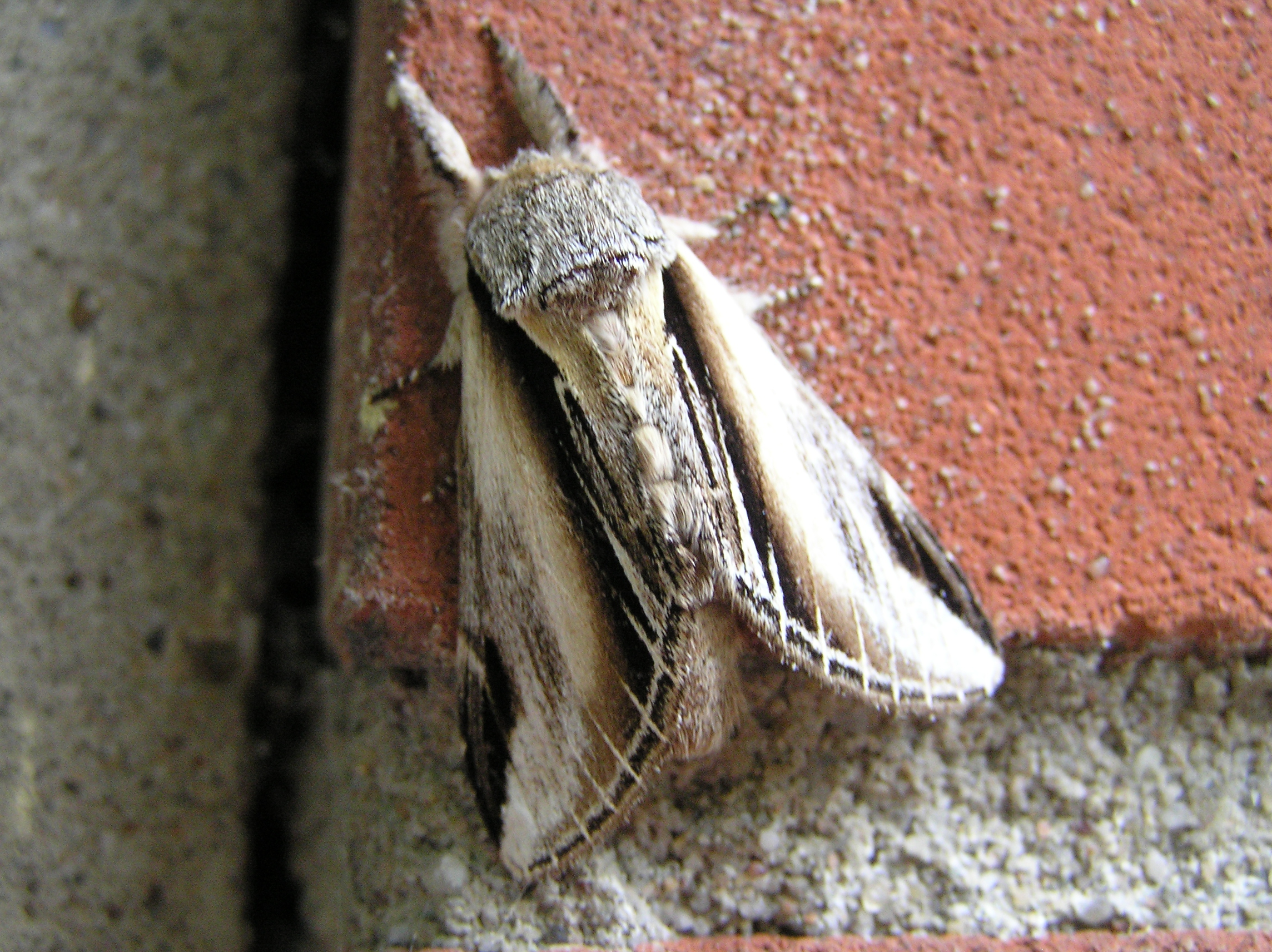

Scientific classification
- Kingdom: Animalia
- Phylum: Arthropoda
- Clade: Pancrustacea
- Class: Insecta
- Order: Lepidoptera
- Superfamily: Noctuoidea
- Family: Notodontidae
- Genus: Pheosia
- Species: P. tremula

Binomial name
- Pheosia tremula (Clerck, 1759)

= Pheosia tremula =

Swallow prominent

Species of moth

Pheosia tremula, the swallow prominent, is a moth from the family Notodontidae. The species was first described by Carl Alexander Clerck in 1759.

The moth can be found in the Palearctic realm, up to the Arctic Circle (northern and central Europe, Russia, Russian Far East, Ussuri, Caucasus). It has a forewing length of 22–28 mm. The moth survives winter as a pupa underground.

== Description ==
Normally whitish, with a brown shaded black stripe along the inner margin of the forewings, and a brownish cloud, with black streaks in it. Towards the tips of these wings; the outer extremities of the veins are white, there is a white wedge-shaped streak between veins 1 and 2, and from the apex of this an indented white line runs to the base of the wing. Sometimes the whole discal area is suffused with brownish. The imago can be easily mistaken with Pheosia gnoma.

Seitz- Head and thorax grey or predominantly brown, abdomen greyish brown. Fore«'ing whitish, brownish at the margins, beyond the middle of the costal margin 2 black longitudinal smears, which often merge together in the shape of a band, a black longitudinal line in front of the hind margin from the base to the distal margin; below vein 1 a long white wedge-spot extending to the distal margin, its distal end being filled in with a dark colour; apical portions of veins 2-—4 white. Hmdwing whitish, blackish along anal angle, within this black colour a narrow white marginal line. — Throughout Central Europe, northward to the Baltic provinces of Russia, southward to Northern Spain, Central Italy, Southern Russia, Armenia; also in Amurland. Egg moderately convex, miniitely punctate, light green or yellowish green.The larva m two colour-varieties : either glossy light green with whitish dorsum, red-brown transverse bar on the tubercle, orange-yellow longitudinal line below the spiracles and red stigma-spots, or uniformly brown-red. In both varieties the stigmata are black with white border. June to October on species of Populus and Salix, also on Birch. Pupa dark brown, in the ground in a hard cell lined with silk. Moth plentiful everywhere, in May and July—August. In the North only one brood.

== Biology ==
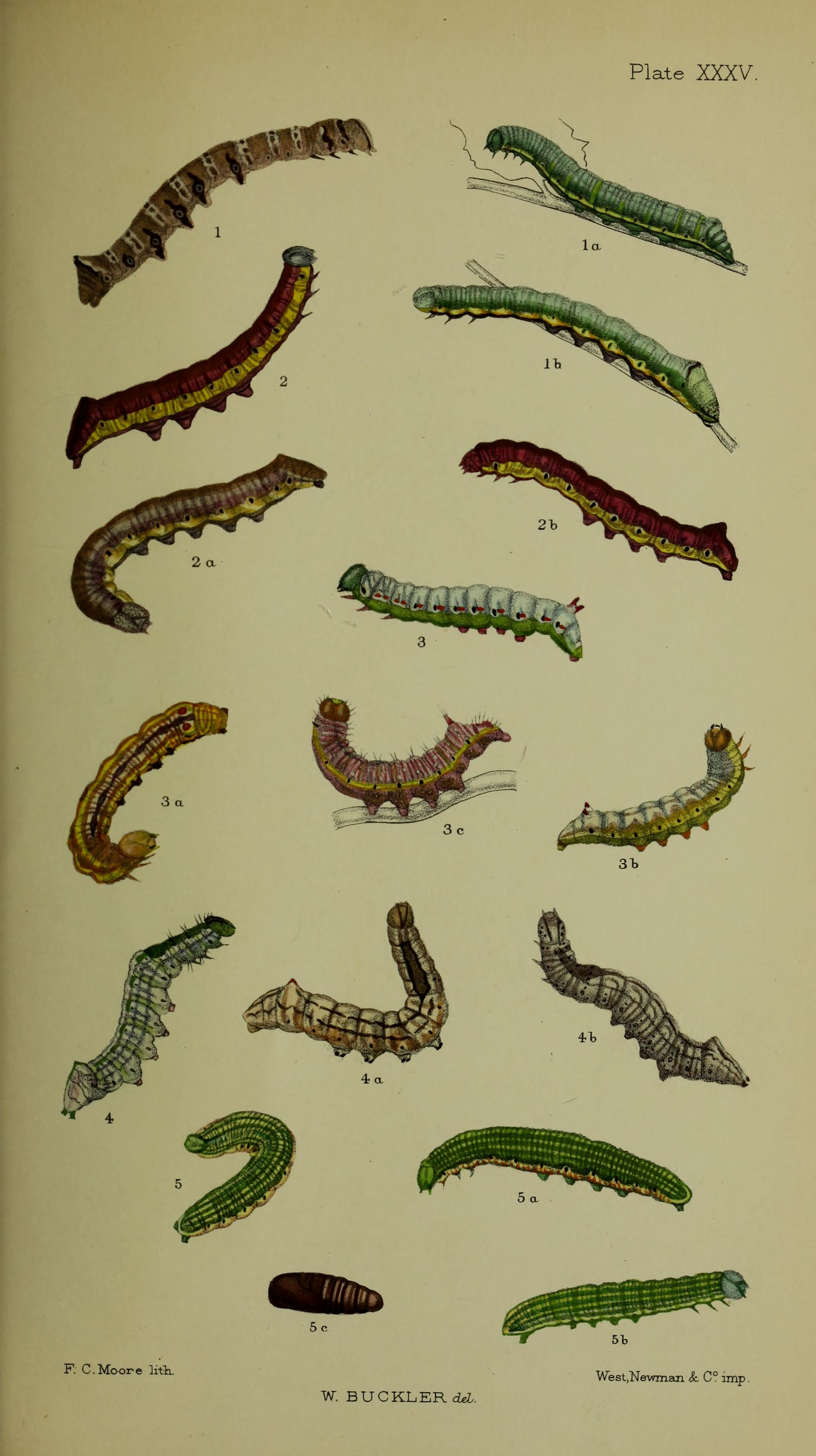
1, 1a, 1b larvae after last moult

The host plant of the swallow prominent are the poplar, especially the aspen, the willow and the birch. For detailed list see Robinson, G. S., P. R. Ackery, I. J. Kitching, G. W. Beccaloni & L. M. Hernández, 2010.
