= Włodzimierz Tetmajer =

Polish painter

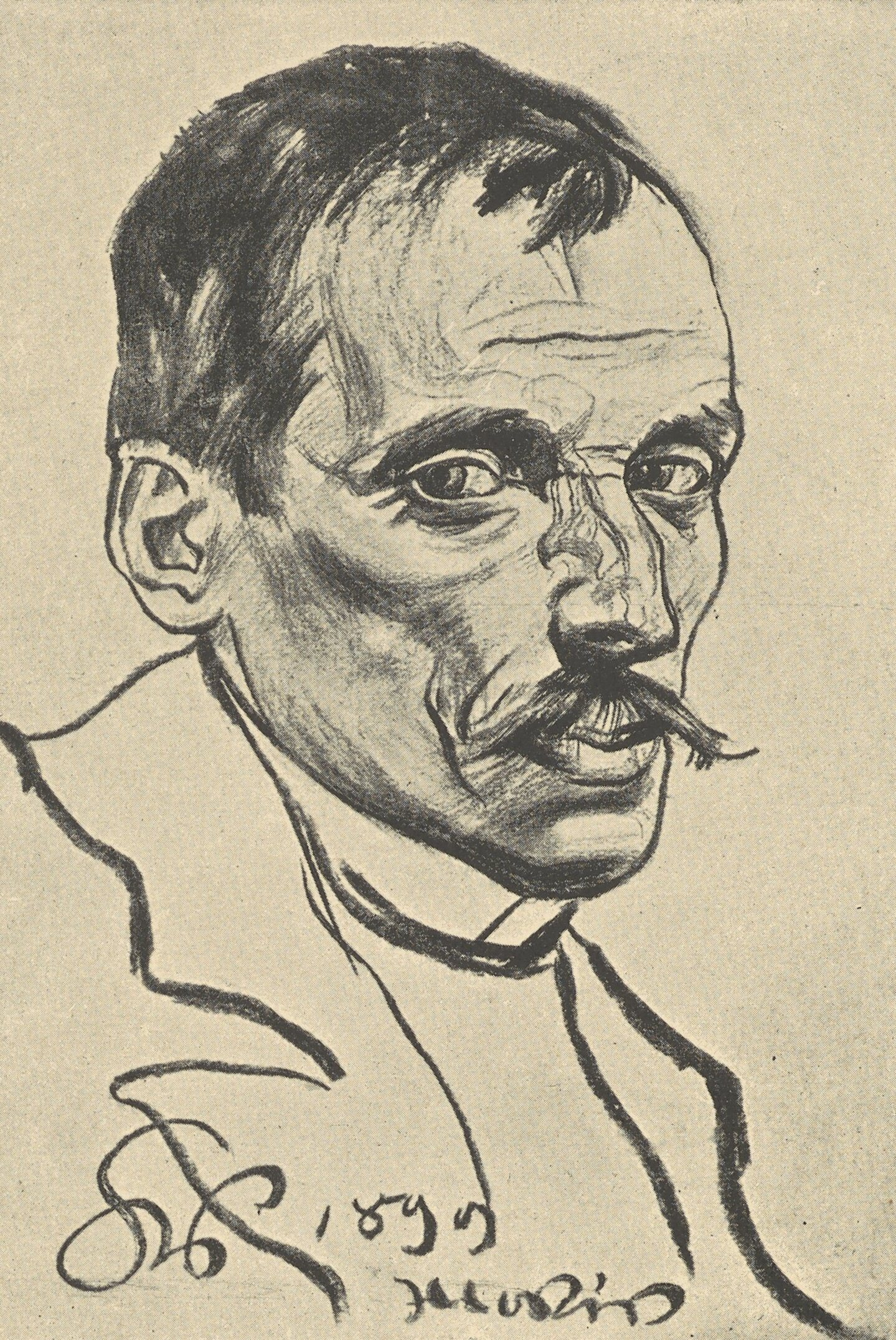
Portrait of Włodzimierz Tetmajer by Stanisław Wyspiański.

Włodzimierz Tetmajer (December 31, 1861 in Harklowa – December 26, 1923 in Kraków) was a Polish painter with works in collections of the National Museum in Warsaw and Kraków.

== Biography ==
Włodzimierz Tetmajer was born in Harklowa near the town of Nowy Targ and died in Bronowice, now a district of Kraków.

Tetmajer studied painting at the Kraków School of Fine Arts (Szkoła Sztuk Pięknych w Krakowie) from 1875 to 1886, then in Vienna and Munich (1886–1889), in Paris at the Académie Colarossi, and with Jan Matejko from 1889 to 1893.

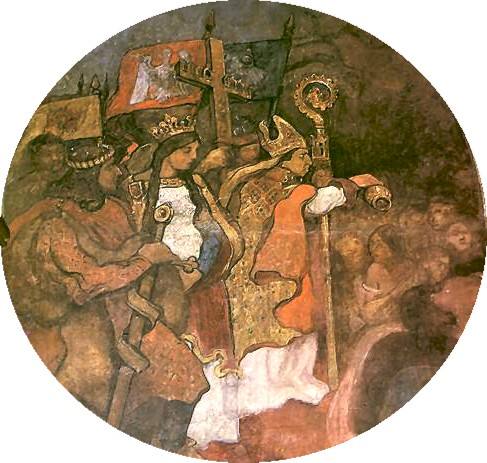
Baptism of Lithuania in 1387 by Włodzimierz Tetmajer

In 1890 he married Anna Mikołajczykówna, a peasant's daughter from Bronowice in the spirit of the Young Poland's return to the roots. Tetmajer settled with his wife in a remote house covered with thatch, where he was often visited by various friends. In 1900 he hosted a wedding of one of his friends, the poet Lucjan Rydel, to his wife's sister, Jadwiga Mikołajczykówna. This village wedding became the inspiration for the dramatist Stanisław Wyspiański who wrote defining Polish independence drama called "Wesele" (The Wedding).

According to Dr. Józef Andrzej Nowobilski:

"One of Poland's finest painters, Tetmajer is an eminent example of a painter of the period of impressionism and Young Poland, who devoted his gift and artistic achievements to the fight for Polish national revival and the restoration of the Polish state. He was convinced that the folk tradition and the apotheosis of the Polish peasant would be the means to achieve those goals."

Włodzimierz Tetmajer was a half-brother of poet, Kazimierz Przerwa-Tetmajer.

== See also ==
- Culture of Kraków
- National Museum in Kraków
