= Józef Tischner =

Polish Catholic priest and philosopher (1931–2000)

The Reverend Józef Stanisław Tischner
- Church: Catholic Church

Personal details
- Born: 12 March 1931 Stary Sącz, Poland
- Died: 28 June 2000 (aged 69) Kraków, Poland
- Parents: Józef Tischner and Weronika Tischner (Chowaniec)
- Education: Jagiellonian University in Kraków

Józef Stanisław Tischner (12 March 1931 – 28 June 2000) was a Polish Catholic priest and philosopher. He was the first chaplain of the trade union Solidarity (Solidarność).

== Life ==
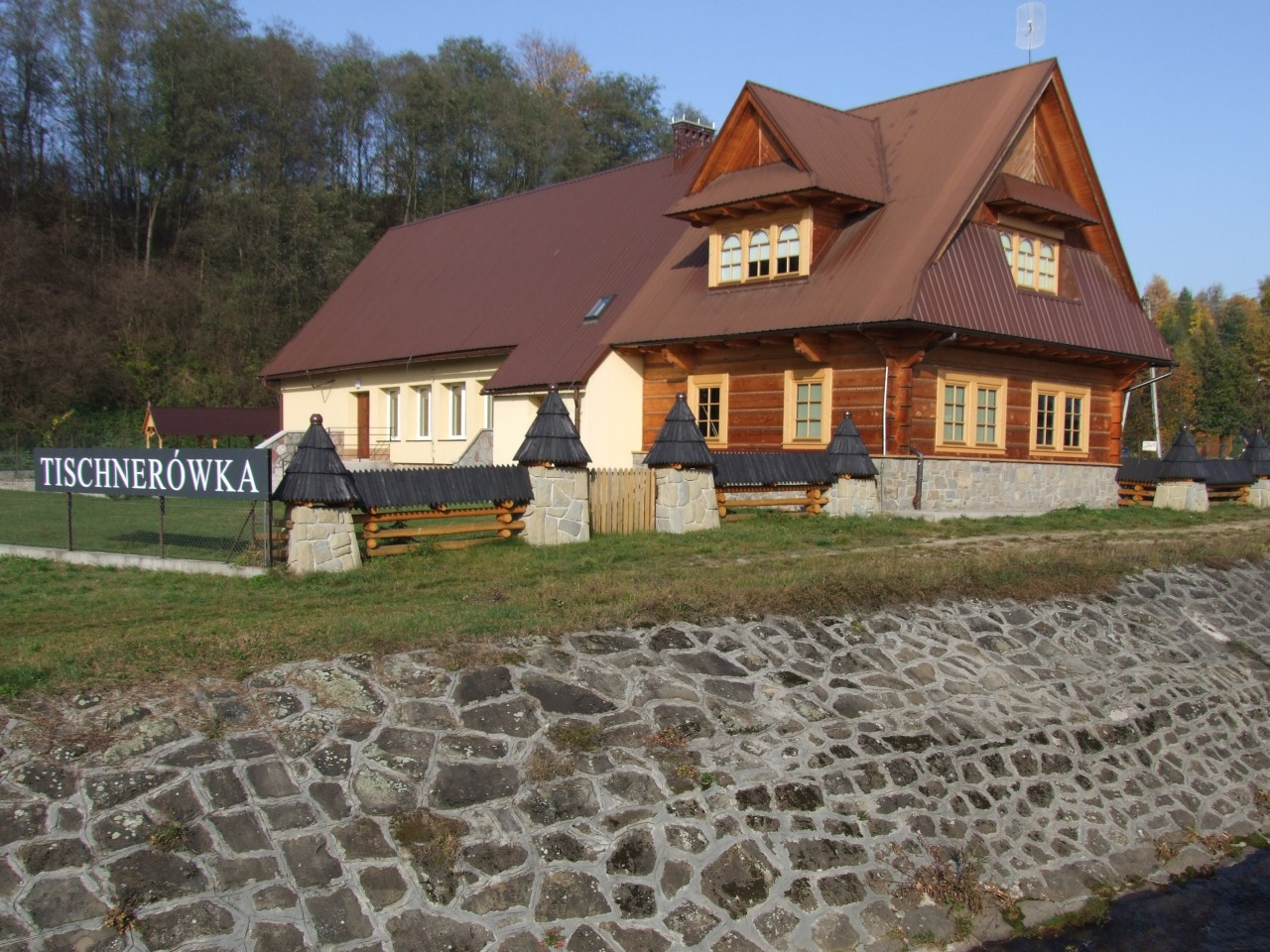
Tisznerówka House in Łopuszna houses a museum devoted to Tischner.

Tischner was born in Stary Sącz to a Góral family and grew up in the village Łopuszna in the south east of Poland. He studied at Jagiellonian University in Kraków. In the 1970s he became an important writer of the opposition movement against the socialist government of the People's Republic of Poland. In 1980s he was considered the semi-official chaplain of the Solidarity movement, and was praised by Pope John Paul II.

After the fall of communism in 1989, he continued preaching the importance of ethics in the new capitalist Poland. In September 1999, Tischner received the Order of the White Eagle, Poland's highest decoration.

Tischner remains a controversial figure in Poland. He frequently criticized Polish religiosity by calling it as flat (shallow) as a pancake, and he also accused the Polish clergy of being ultraconservative, engaged in politics, and antisemitism.

Tischner was involved in politics, he supported the Liberal Democratic Congress, then was a member of the program council of the Freedom Union. Tischner also cooperated on scientific ground with Jarosław Gowin.

Tischner was a contributor to Tygodnik Powszechny, a liberal Catholic, and Christian democratic weekly newspaper.

Tischner was also member of Związek Podhalański, an organisation of Gorals from Podhale.

Fellow of Collegium Invisibile as a professor of philosophy. He died in Kraków on 28 June 2000.

== Philosophy ==
Tischner, in The Decline of Thomistic Christianity (1970), challenged the philosophical primacy of Thomism, arguing it closed philosophy in one right direction and thus obscuring Revelation. Tischner believed that philosophy was independent and, although imbued with the spirit of Christianity in many respects, could not be reduced to it.

In articles collected in the books Unhappy Gift of Freedom (1993), In the Land of Ill Imagination (1997) and Priest on the Wanderings (1999), he expressed his views on the issue of building a new social, political and ethical order.

== Selected publications ==
Tischner wrote and published more than 600 articles and books.

His main works, in which he explained his original philosophical concepts, are:

- The Decline of Thomistic Christianity (Schyłek chrześcijaństwa tomistycznego) (1970)
- Unhappy Gift of Freedom (Nieszczęsny dar wolności) (1993)
- Land of Ill Imagination (W krainie schorowanej wyobraźni) (1997)
- Priest on the Wanderings (Ksiądz na manowcach) (1999)
- The Philosophy of Drama (Filozofia dramatu) (1998)
- The Controversy over Human Existence (Spór o istnienie człowieka) (1998)

Most notable among his Góral themed works is:

- A Goral History of Philosophy (Historia filozofii po góralsku) (1997)

== See also ==
- Knights of the Order of the White Eagle

== Sources ==
- "Nie ma rzeczy niemożliwych" . Magazyn Kulturalny Tygodnika Powszechnego nr 7/8 (56/57), 08 lipca 2001.
- "Lektury nie tylko obowiązkowe". Dziennik Polski, 14 maja 2009.
