= Knurów, Lesser Poland Voivodeship =

Knurów
- Village
- Location within Poland
- Coordinates: 49°28′54″N 20°11′2″E
- Country: Poland
- Voivodeship: Lesser Poland
- County: Nowy Targ
- Gmina: Nowy Targ
- Population: 460

Knurów [ˈknuruf] is a village in the administrative district of Gmina Nowy Targ, within Nowy Targ County, Lesser Poland Voivodeship, in southern Poland.
