= Długopole =

- Village
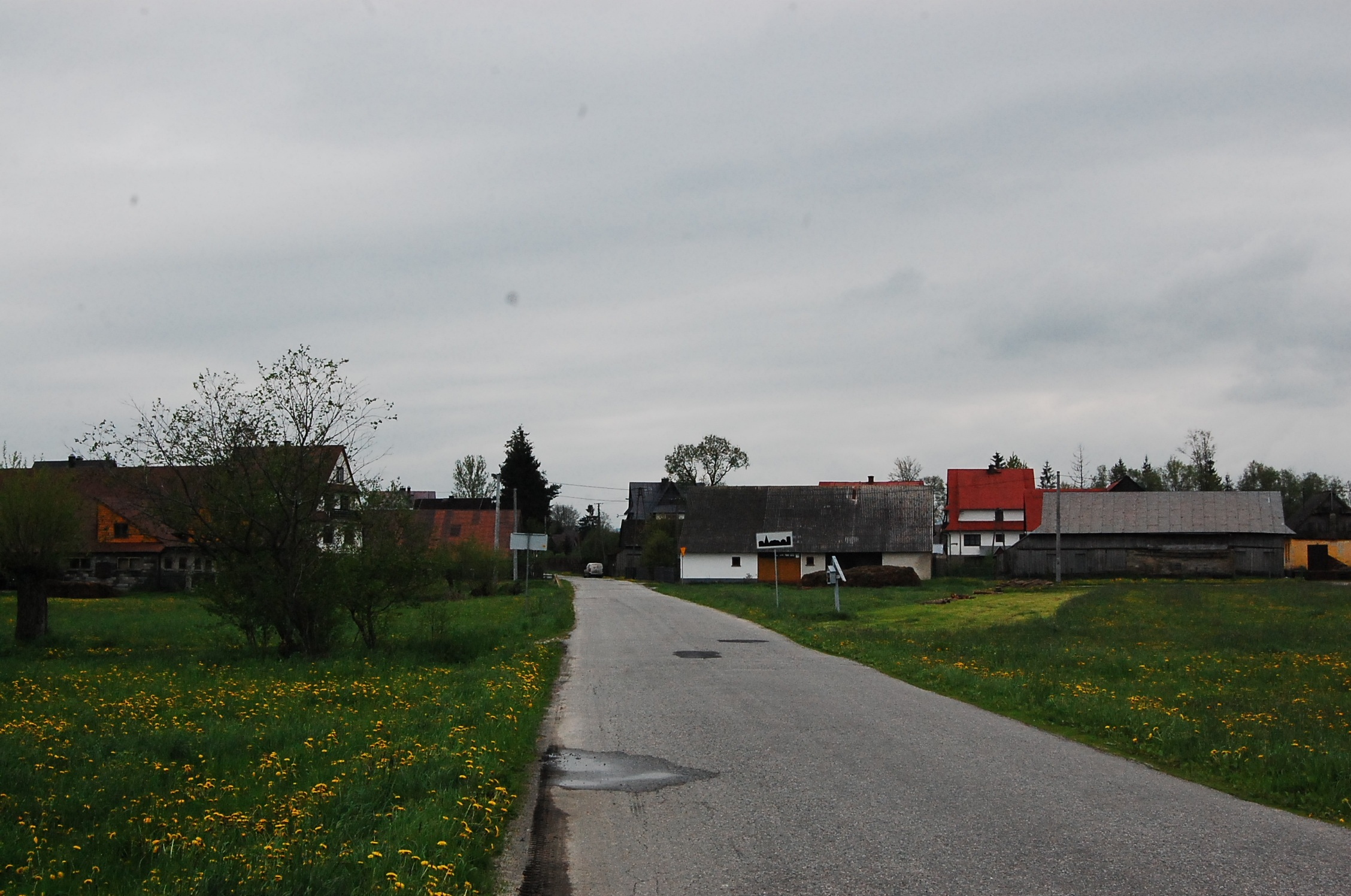
- View of the village

- Location within Poland
- Coordinates: 49°29′N 19°56′E
- Country: Poland
- Voivodeship: Lesser Poland
- County: Nowy Targ
- Gmina: Nowy Targ

Długopole [dwuɡɔˈpɔlɛ] is a village in the administrative district of Gmina Nowy Targ, within Nowy Targ County, Lesser Poland Voivodeship, in southern Poland.
