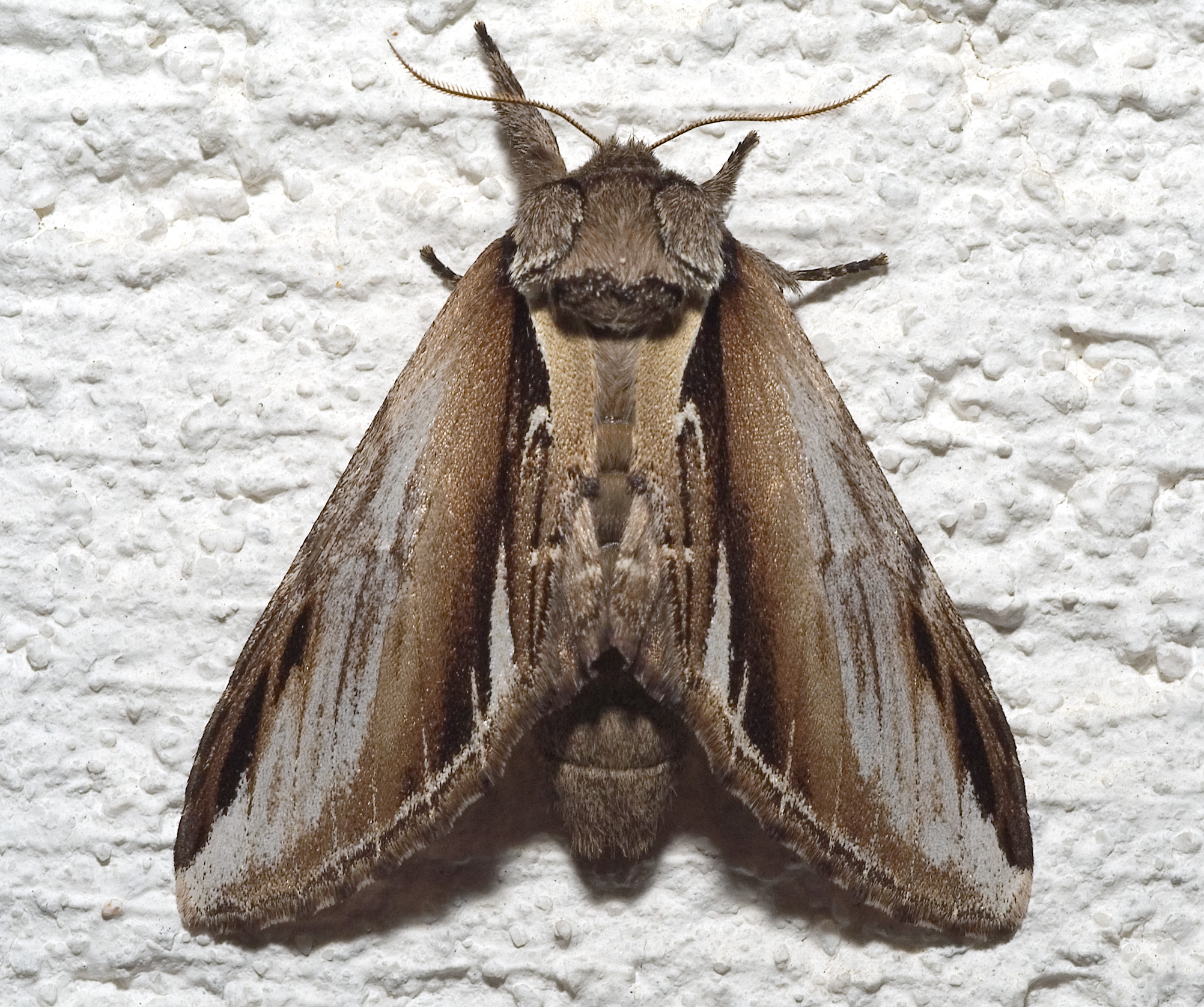

Scientific classification
- Kingdom: Animalia
- Phylum: Arthropoda
- Clade: Pancrustacea
- Class: Insecta
- Order: Lepidoptera
- Superfamily: Noctuoidea
- Family: Notodontidae
- Subfamily: Notodontinae
- Genus: Pheosia; Hübner, [1819]

= Pheosia =

Genus of moths

Pheosia is a genus of moths of the family Notodontidae.

== Species ==
- Pheosia albivertex (Hampson, [1893])
- Pheosia buddhista (Püngeler, 1899)
- Pheosia fusiformis (Matsumura)
- Pheosia gnoma (Fabricius, 1777)
- Pheosia rimosa Packard, 1864 (syn: Pheosia portlandia H. Edwards, 1886)
- Pheosia tremula (Clerck, 1759)
- ?Pheosia dimidiata Herrich-Schäffer, 1856
