= Trute =

- Village
- Location within Poland
- Coordinates: 49°29′29″N 19°58′06″E
- Country: Poland
- Voivodeship: Lesser Poland
- County: Nowy Targ
- Gmina: Nowy Targ
- Population: 560

Trute [ˈtrutɛ] is a village in the administrative district of Gmina Nowy Targ, within Nowy Targ County, Lesser Poland Voivodeship, in southern Poland.

Trute runs parallel to the river Lepietnica, the main street diverts in two directions creating a letter T shape. The village has a small forest that stretches along the boundaries.
