= Gmina Nowy Targ =

Gmina Nowy Targ Nowy Targ Commune
- Gmina
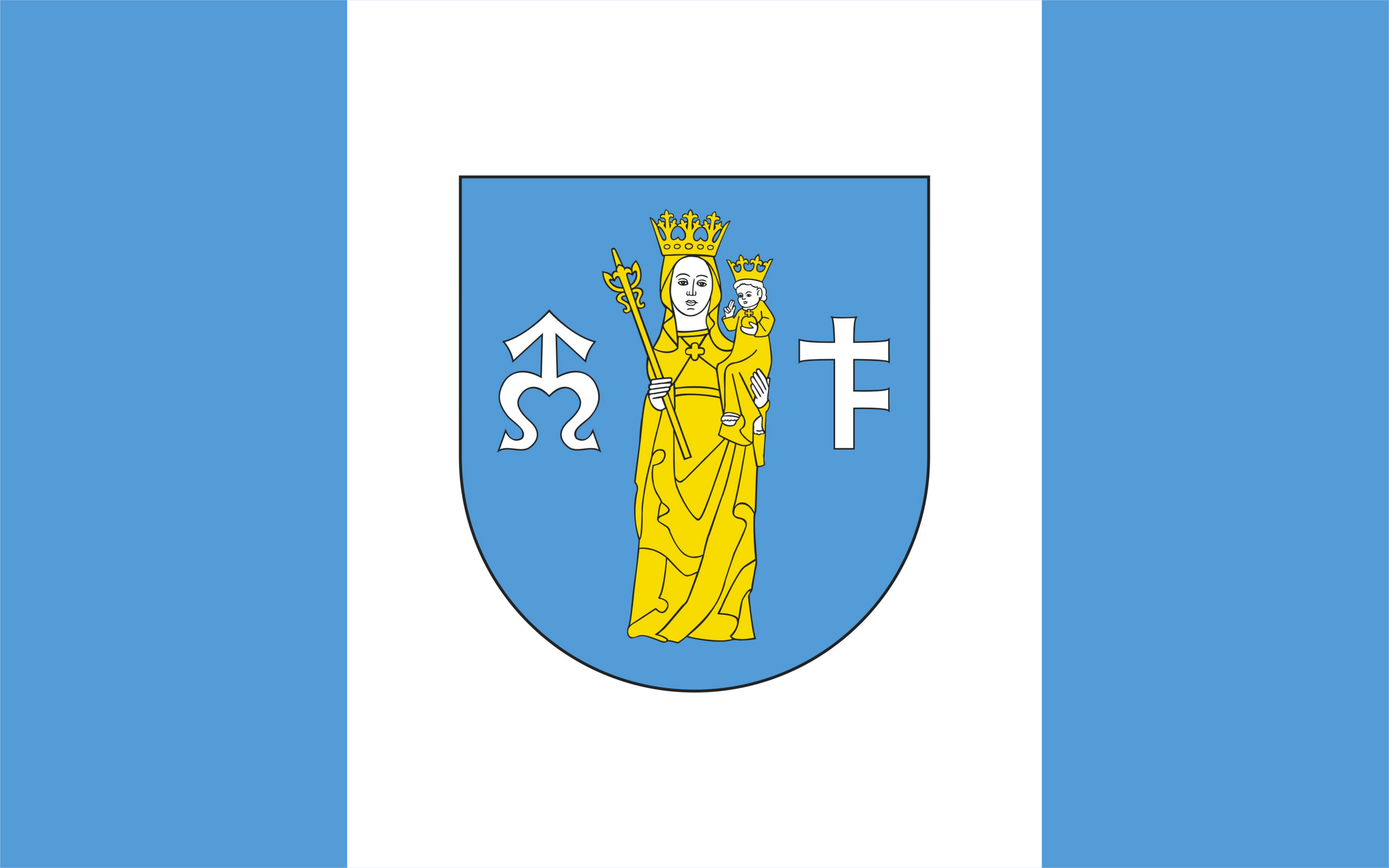
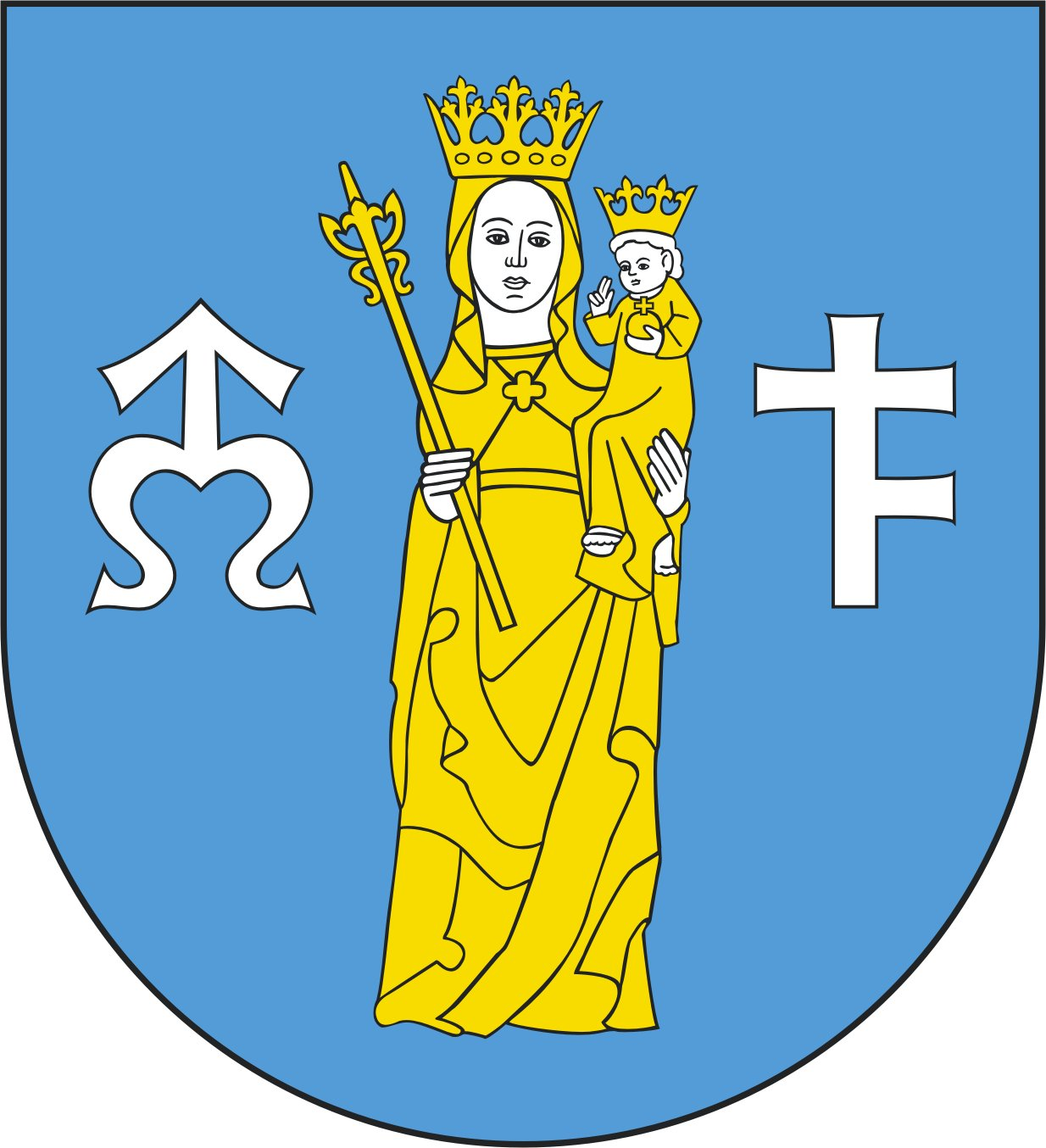
- Flag Coat of arms

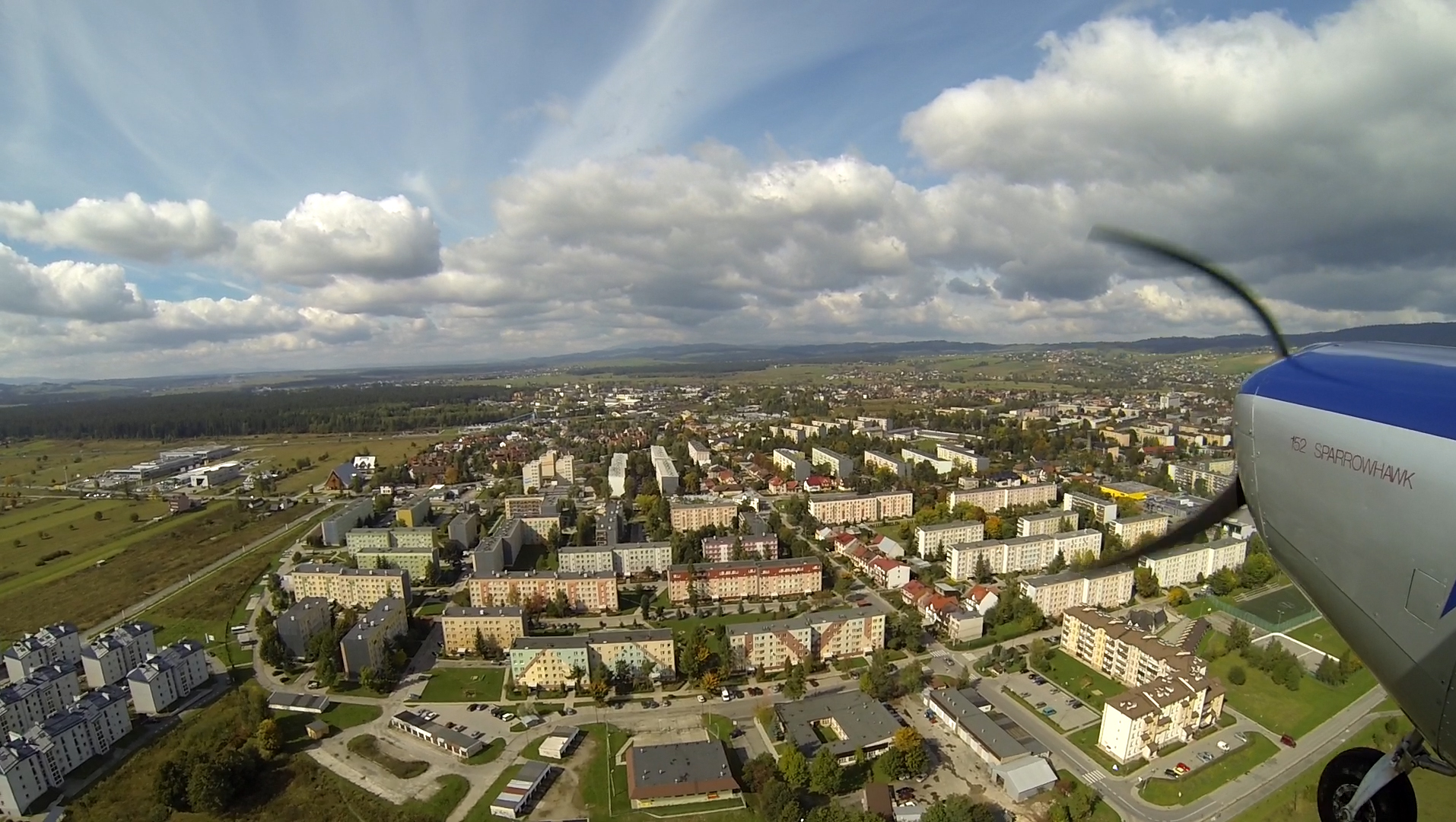
- Coordinates (Nowy Targ): 49°28′N 20°1′E
- Country: Poland
- Voivodeship: Lesser Poland
- County: Nowy Targ
- Seat: Nowy Targ

Area
  - Total: 208.65 km^{2} (80.56 sq mi)

Population (2006)
  - Total: 22,070
  - Density: 105.8/km^{2} (274.0/sq mi)
- Website: http://www.ugnowytarg.pl/

Gmina Nowy Targ is a rural gmina (administrative district) in Nowy Targ County, Lesser Poland Voivodeship, in southern Poland. Its seat is the town of Nowy Targ, although the town itself is not part of the territory of the gmina.

The gmina covers an area of 208.65 square kilometres (80.6 sq mi), and as of 2006 its total population is 22,070.

== Villages ==
Gmina Nowy Targ contains the villages and settlements of Dębno, Długopole, Dursztyn, Gronków, Harklowa, Klikuszowa, Knurów, Krauszów, Krempachy, Lasek, Łopuszna, Ludźmierz, Morawczyna, Nowa Biała, Obidowa, Ostrowsko, Pyzówka, Rogoźnik, Szlembark, Trute and Waksmund.

== Neighbouring gminas ==
Gmina Nowy Targ is bordered by the town of Nowy Targ and by the gminas of Bukowina Tatrzańska, Czarny Dunajec, Czorsztyn, Kamienica, Łapsze Niżne, Niedźwiedź, Ochotnica Dolna, Raba Wyżna, Rabka-Zdrój and Szaflary.
