= Morawczyna =

- Village
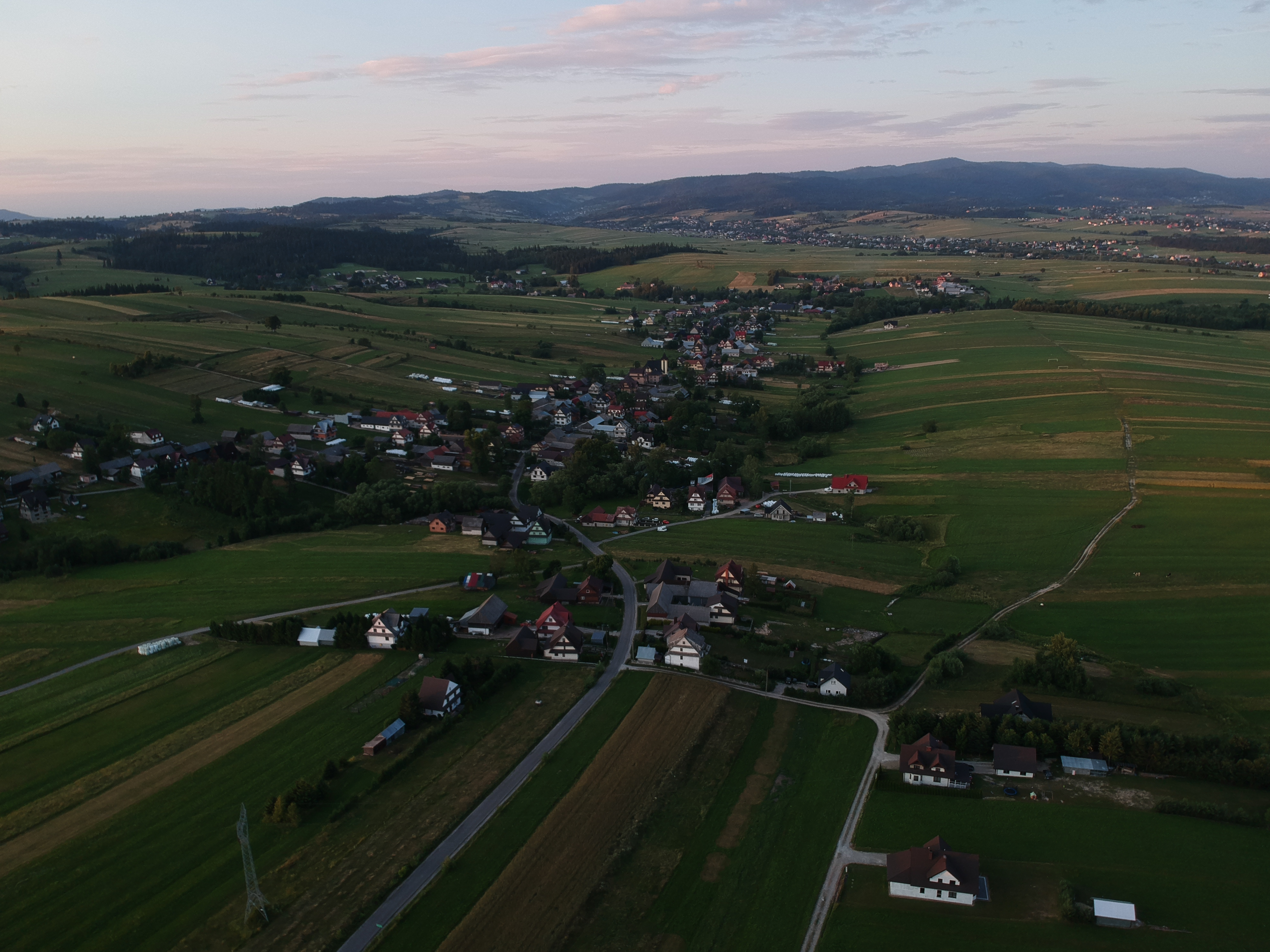

- Location within Poland
- Coordinates: 49°30′N 19°57′E
- Country: Poland
- Voivodeship: Lesser Poland
- County: Nowy Targ
- Gmina: Nowy Targ

Morawczyna [mɔrafˈt͡ʂɨna] is a village in the administrative district of Gmina Nowy Targ, within Nowy Targ County, Lesser Poland Voivodeship, in southern Poland.
