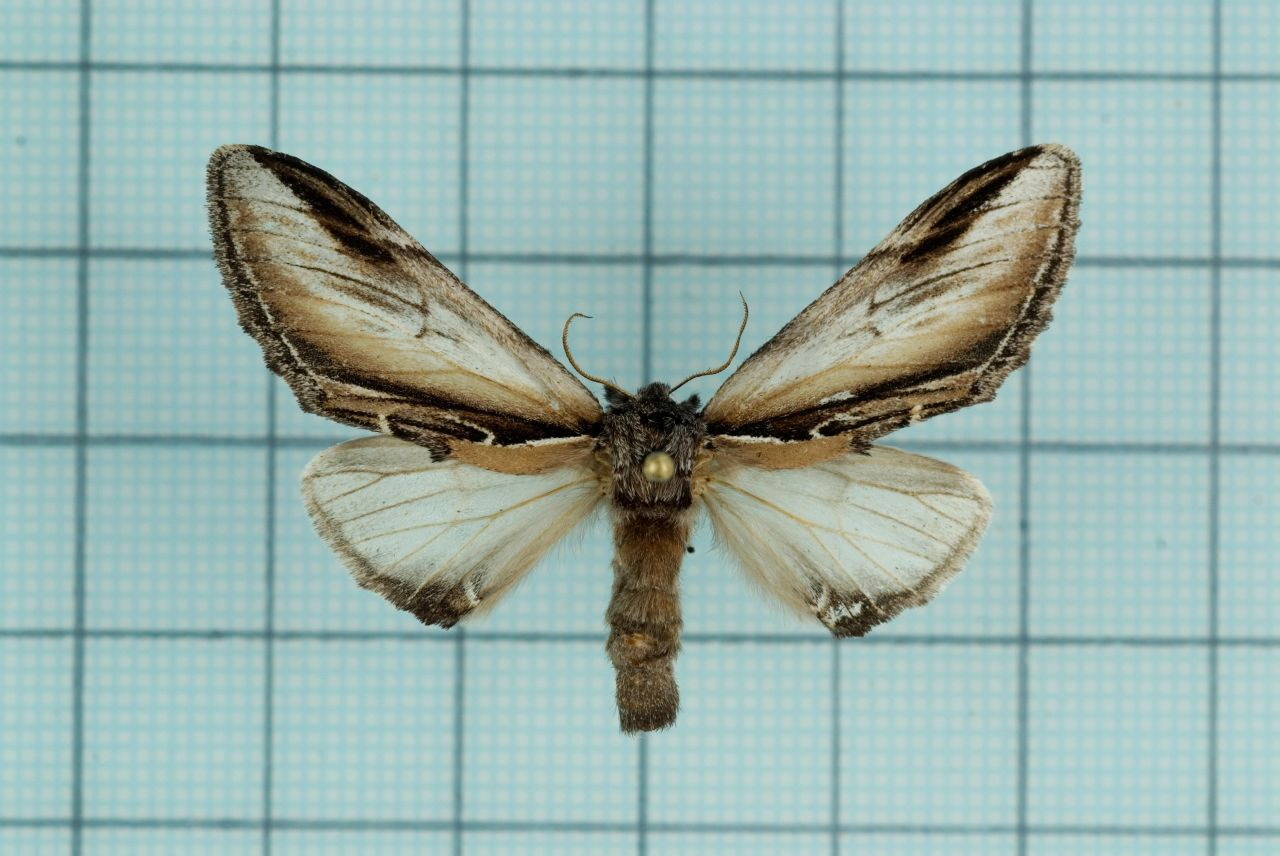
- Pheosia rimosa taiwanognoma

Scientific classification
- Kingdom: Animalia
- Phylum: Arthropoda
- Clade: Pancrustacea
- Class: Insecta
- Order: Lepidoptera
- Superfamily: Noctuoidea
- Family: Notodontidae
- Genus: Pheosia
- Species: P. rimosa

Binomial name
- Pheosia rimosa Packard, 1864

Synonyms
- Notodonta californica Stretch 1872; Pheosia portlandia H. Edwards, 1886; Pheosia taiwanognoma Nakamura, 1973

= Pheosia rimosa =

Species of moth

Pheosia rimosa, the black-rimmed prominent moth, fissured prominent or false-sphinx, is a moth of the family Notodontidae. The species was first described by Alpheus Spring Packard in 1864. It is found from coast to coast in North America, although it is less common in the south-eastern United States.

The wingspan is 43–62 mm. Adults are on wing from spring to fall.

The larvae feed on the leaves of Populus and Salix species.

== Subspecies ==
- Pheosia rimosa rimosa
- Pheosia rimosa taiwanognoma Nakamura, 1973 (Taiwan)

== Taxonomy ==
Pheosia portlandia was previously treated as a distinct species, replacing P. rimosa in Pacific coastal forests. Research has concluded that Pheosia portlandia is a synonym of P. rimosa.
