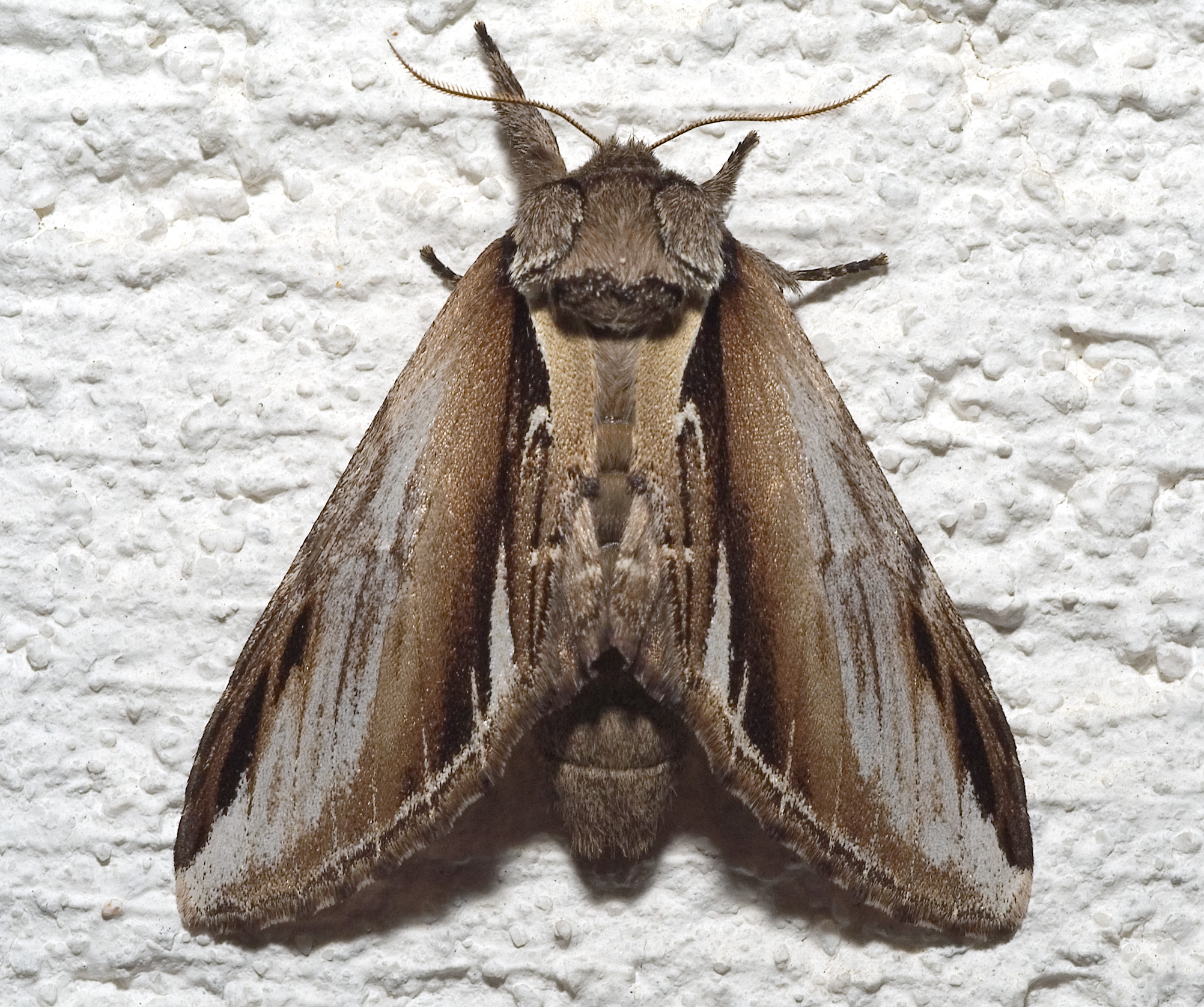

Scientific classification
- Domain: Eukaryota
- Kingdom: Animalia
- Phylum: Arthropoda
- Class: Insecta
- Order: Lepidoptera
- Superfamily: Noctuoidea
- Family: Notodontidae
- Genus: Pheosia
- Species: P. gnoma

Binomial name
- Pheosia gnoma (Fabricius, 1777)

= Pheosia gnoma =

Lesser swallow prominent

Species of moth

Pheosia gnoma, the lesser swallow prominent, is a moth from the family Notodontidae. The species was first described by Johan Christian Fabricius in 1777.

The moth can be found across the Palearctic realm (northern and central Europe, Russia, eastern Siberia, Russian Far East, Amur). It has a forewing length of 20–26 mm.

== Description ==
The imago can be easily confused with Pheosia tremula but P. gnoma is usually smaller, and the ground colour has usually less brown in it. The chief character by which it may be distinguished is the broader and clearer white wedge-shaped mark between veins 1 and 2 on the forewings of P. gnoma.

Seitz - Very similar to tremula, usually somewhat smaller, the white wedge-spot below vein 1 of the forewing shorter and entirely white, without dark scaling in it. Anal angle of hindwing brownish without white marginal line. In the Higher Alps occurs a dark form of this species, ab. leonis Stichel which is scarcely distinguishable from the Arctic form frigida Zett. (45f) from Lapland, in which the wedge-spot of the forewing is grey instead of white. — Throughout Central Europe, northward to Lapland, southward to Southern France, Northern Italy, Croatia, and the Bukovina; East Asia (Amurland). Egg at first whitish green, becoming gradually darker, being finally grey like poppy-seeds. Larva dark brown-red or bright light green, glossy, with blackish transverse bar on the tubercle and broad orange-yellow lateral line, at the upper edge of which the white-edged black stigmata are placed; on the underside a similar yellow longitudinal stripe. July to September on Birch. Pupa dark brown. Moth in 2 broods, May—June and again in August. In the North only one brood.

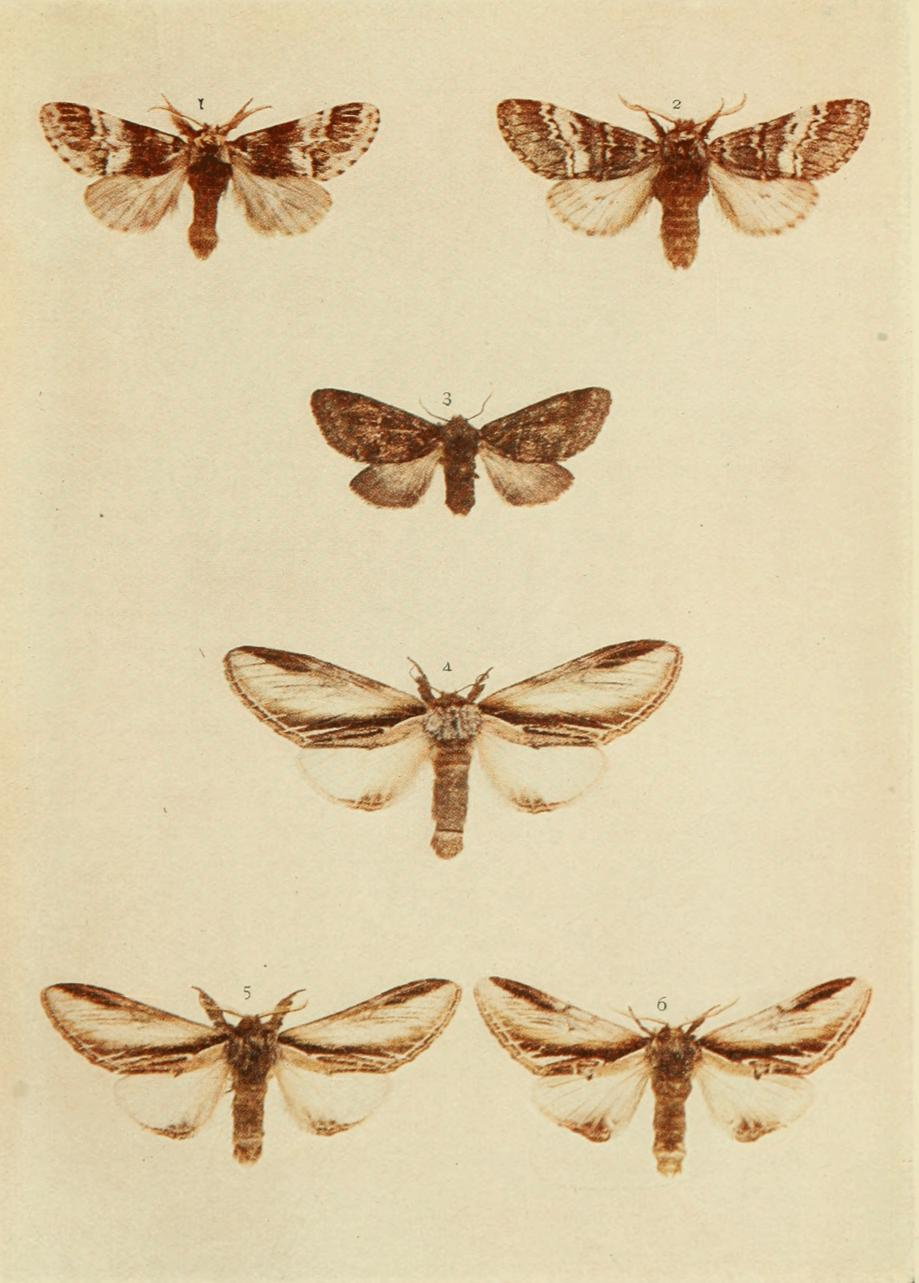
Plate showing the differences between P. gnoma and P. tremula

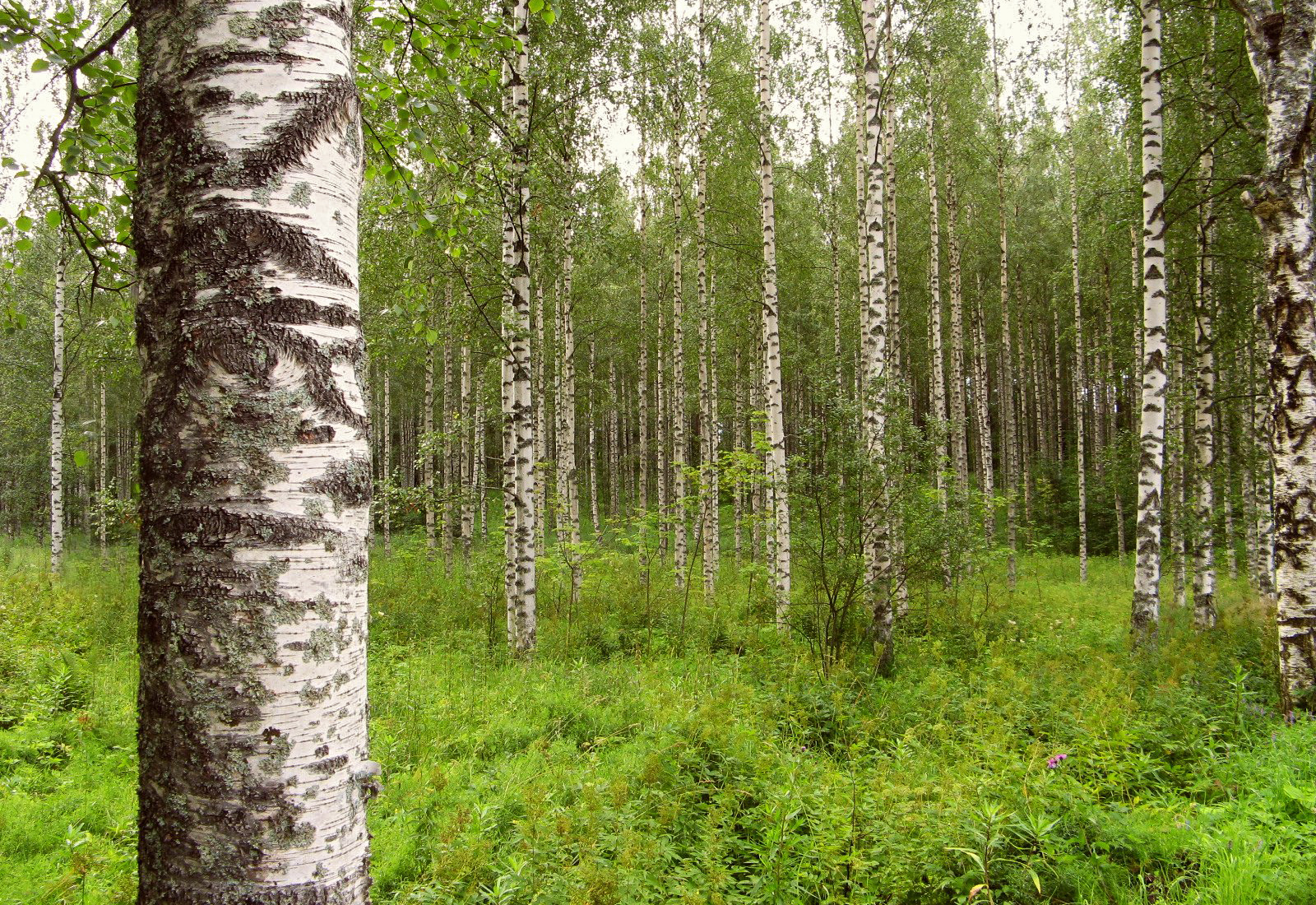
Habitat in Finland

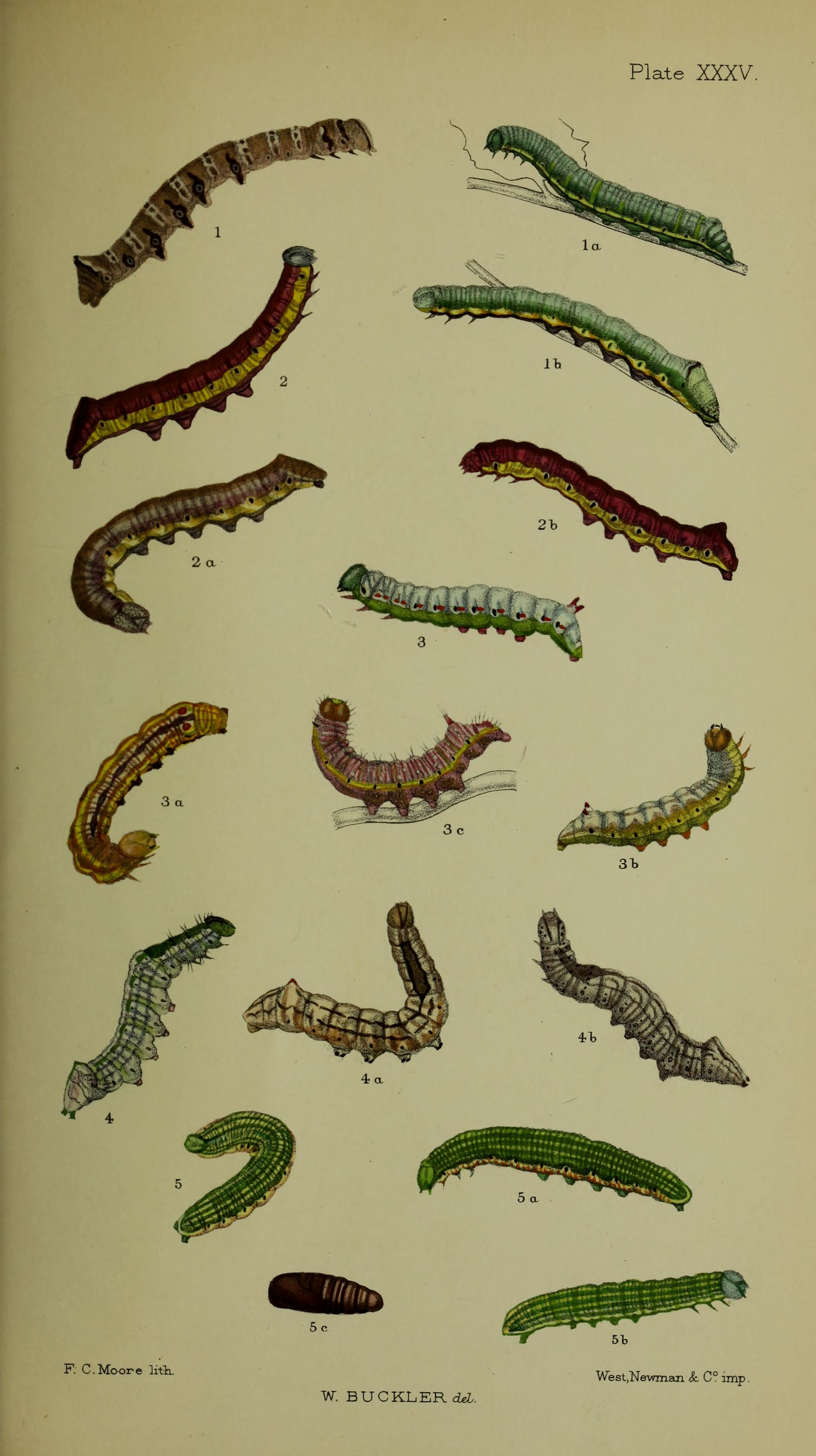
2, 2a, 2b larvae after last moult

The host plant of the lesser swallow prominent is the birch (Betula) (British Isles), Betula pendula (Finland) Betula pubescens (Finland).

The moth survives winter as a pupa underground.
