= Obidowa =

- Village
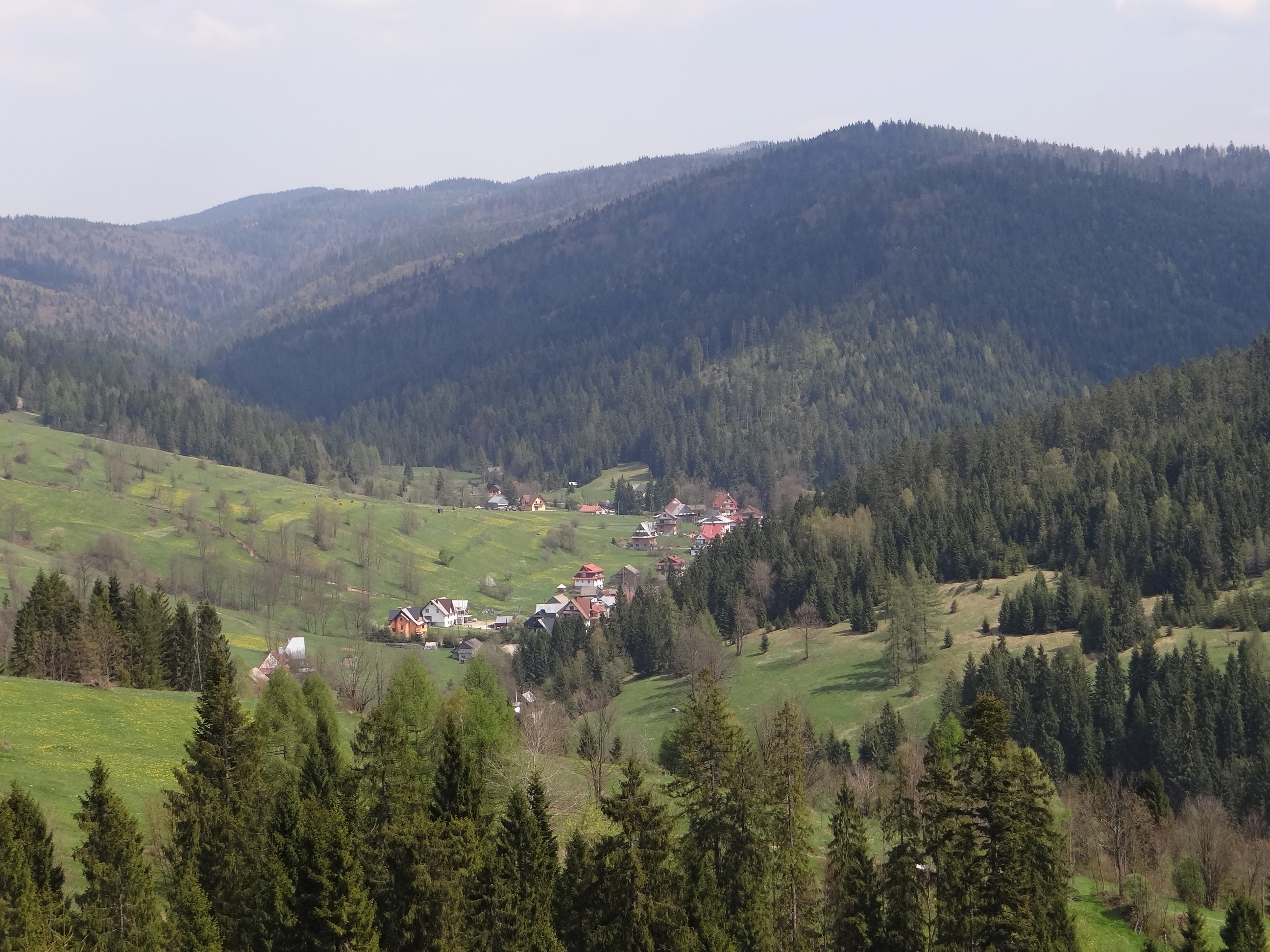
- General view

- Location within Poland
- Coordinates: 49°32′58″N 20°1′25″E
- Country: Poland
- Voivodeship: Lesser Poland
- County: Nowy Targ
- Gmina: Nowy Targ
- Population (approx.): 780

Obidowa [ɔbiˈdɔva] is a village in the administrative district of Gmina Nowy Targ, within Nowy Targ County, Lesser Poland Voivodeship, in southern Poland.

The village has an approximate population of 780.
