= Pyzówka =

- Village
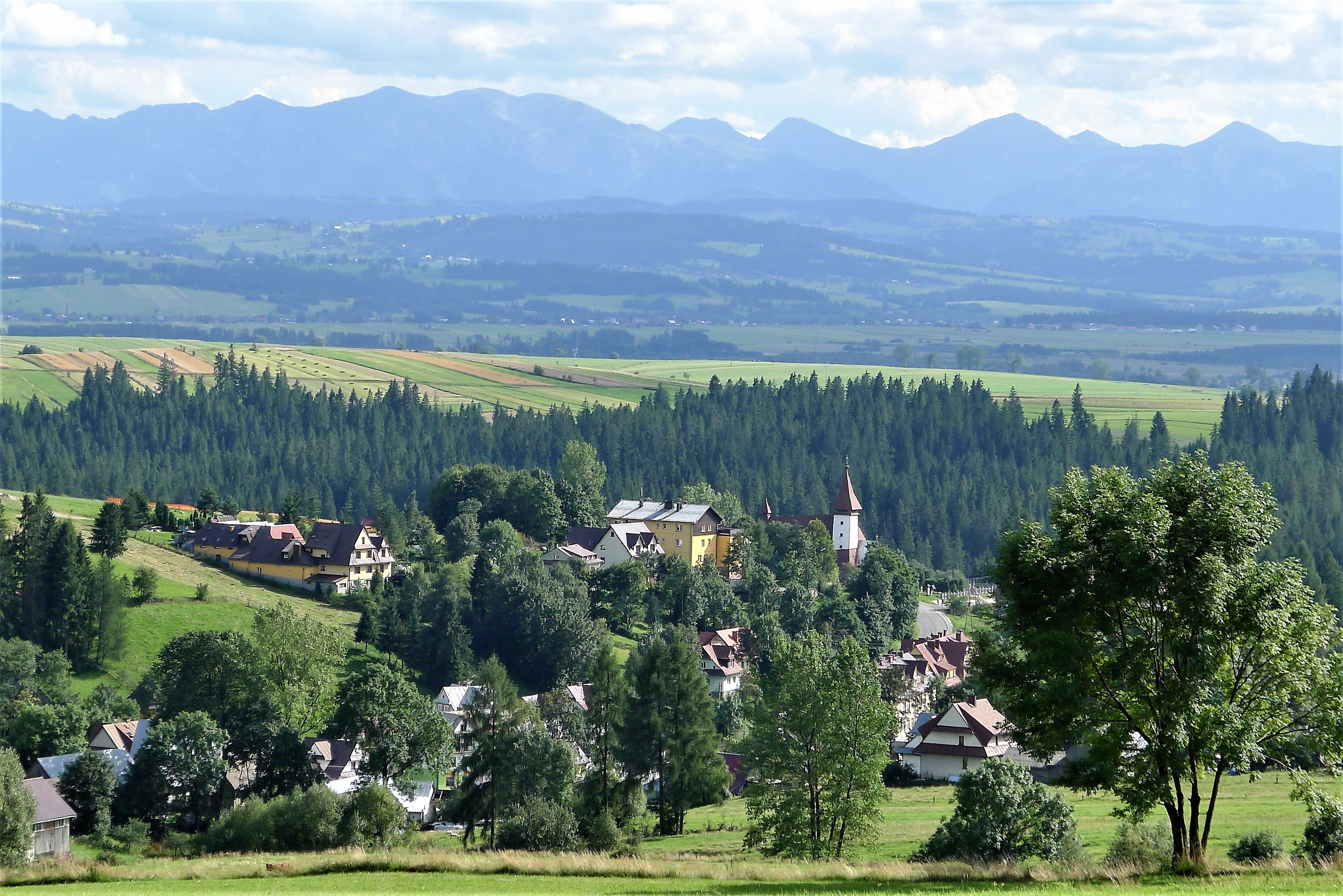
- Village center with local Catholic church and Tatras

- Location within Poland
- Coordinates: 49°32′N 19°57′E
- Country: Poland
- Voivodeship: Lesser Poland
- County: Nowy Targ
- Gmina: Nowy Targ
- Population (approx.): 928

Pyzówka [pɨˈzufka] is a village in the administrative district of Gmina Nowy Targ, within Nowy Targ County, Lesser Poland Voivodeship, in southern Poland.

The village has an approximate population of 928.

== History ==
Pyzówka (or Śreniawa as it was also known) has historically been one of the outlying villages that form the royal demesne of Nowy Targ, comprising 37 villages and the town of Nowy Targ.

Pyzówka was first settled in the late 16th century when the Pieniążek family administered the Nowy Targ demesne. The family claimed payment for settling the village in 1616. Minakowski's Wielka Genealogia states that Jan Pieniążek z Krużlowej (approx. 1540 - 1602) was the dziedzic (heir) of Pyzówka and Wróblówka. His mother, Anna Pukarzowska, carried the Śreniawa coat of arms (Polish crests all have individuals names) which may have given rise to the village's alternative name.

According to Krzeptowski and Krzeptowska the village was established by Mateusz (Matthew) Pyza, who was the brother of Piotr Czerwiński, Sołtys (Elder) in the neighbouring, and much older, village of Klikuszowa. The first written document that mentions the Pyzówka (using its earlier name of Śreniawa) is a court record of 1604 noting a dispute involving a village resident called Tomasz Gomolka. The next recorded document, dated 1606, notes that Mikołaj Matiowicz was re-affirmed in his role as Sołtys of Pyzówka/Śreniawa that year. Krzeptowski and Krzeptowska note that Matiowicz (a patronymic that likely means son of Mateusz) was the eldest son of Mateusz Pyza. The different surnames recorded for father and son would not have been unusual in 16th-century Poland when surnames were neither fixed (people would commonly use several which might include a patronymic, a place of origin, a nickname, a parents surname or a house name (name associated with the individual's plot of land or house) nor inherited as a rule.

The Sołtystwo (which in the 16th century typically gave its holder the privilege both to own land and assign land to settlers in exchange for corvee labour) did not then pass to Matiowicz's offspring (Krzeptowski and Krzeptowska do not record him having any children or a wife), but was passed on to his brother Jakub Pyza Śreniawa, to use the name recorded in a document dated 1611. In this document Jakub Pyza Śreniawa's daughter Dorota, is described as Sołtys (female) of Śreniawa (“Sołtyska Śreniawska”) and leaves money and goods to her second husband Filip Fornalik.

== Village Name ==
Pyzówka is considered an example of the phenomenon of a village name given by an administrator being usurped by a popular name. As noted in the history section, the village originally was given the name Sreniawa, as recorded in several early documents. Adamczyk suggests that this was in tribute to the powerful Sreniawit family (which like the Pukarzowskis (see above) carries the Szreniawa/Śreniawa coat of arms). The village's first Sołtys, who would have been the settlement's major landholder with the task of growing it, was, however, known by the surname/nickname Pyza (pudgy of face) and it appears the Polish possessive form of that name, Pyzówka (meaning Pyza's place), became commonly used for the entire settlement.

An early document from 1611 refers to Dorota,‘sołtyska śreniawska ’ (Sołtys of Śreniawa) and identifies her as ‘dziewka Jakuba Pyza Śreniawy (daughter of Jakub Pyza Śreniawa). But, as noted in the History section, in 1606 an official document already referred to both Pyzówka and Śreniawa and subsequent Soltyship holders are referred to as Dorota and Filip Pyzowscy (a possessive which can refer to either the village name or their parents’ name ). It is clear from parish records that a branch of this Soltys family retained the surname Pyzowski (and moved to the nearby town of Nowy Targ) while another branch reverted to the surname Czerwiński (remaining in Pyzówka) that was used by the same clan (polish - rod) when still resident in the older village of Klikuszowa (the History section describes the original settlement of Pyzowka by the brother of Piotr Czerwiński, Jakub ‘Pyza’) .

Given that there are no other villages of the name Pyzówka in Poland, it is possible that all living persons of the surname Pyzowski(a) may be related to Jakub Pyza. The legal/social estate status of the Pyzowski family remains unclear. One document refers to the Pyzowskis as szlachetni (noble) but other documents make no mention of this status. The Gajl Polish heraldic text records the name Pyzowski but shows no coat of arms recorded for the family.

== Academic Studies ==
Pyzówka is unusual in Poland in being the focus of several academic studies and surveys.

The earliest was carried out in 1947 – 1949 by the Instytut Ekonomiki Rolnej ( Institute of Agricultural Economics) under the direction of Professor Bogusław Gałęski. The surveys covered every farm in the village and described the extreme poverty of the inhabitants. The surveys are retained by the IER in Warsaw.

An historical study of archives relating to the village was carried out in 1972 by Professor Mieczysław Adamczyk. The unpublished manuscript contains transcripts of archival material dating from 1767. A copy is held in the village.

In the 1970s Dr F. Pine and T. Bogdanowicz carried out socio-anthropological fieldwork in the village that included observer participation for two years as well as an analysis of parish records, historical archives and door to door surveys of village households. Dr Pine's doctoral thesis is held at the University of London and the London School of Economics.

Wiesław Parzygnat, the current village Sołtys (Elder), is recording personal histories of village residents notably biographies of the much decorated Polish war hero Franciszek Rola (also known as Władysław Smereczynski), and his brother, the village Soltys and social activist Jan Rola, recipient of Poland's highest civil honour, the Gold Cross of Merit.

Józef Krzeptowski and Maria Jasinek Krzeptowska have devoted a section of their comprehensive Genealogies of the Sołtys Families of the Podhale to Pyzówka. They provide a detailed genealogy of the Pyza, Śreniawa, Pyzowski, Czerwiński clan.
