= Krauszów =

- Village
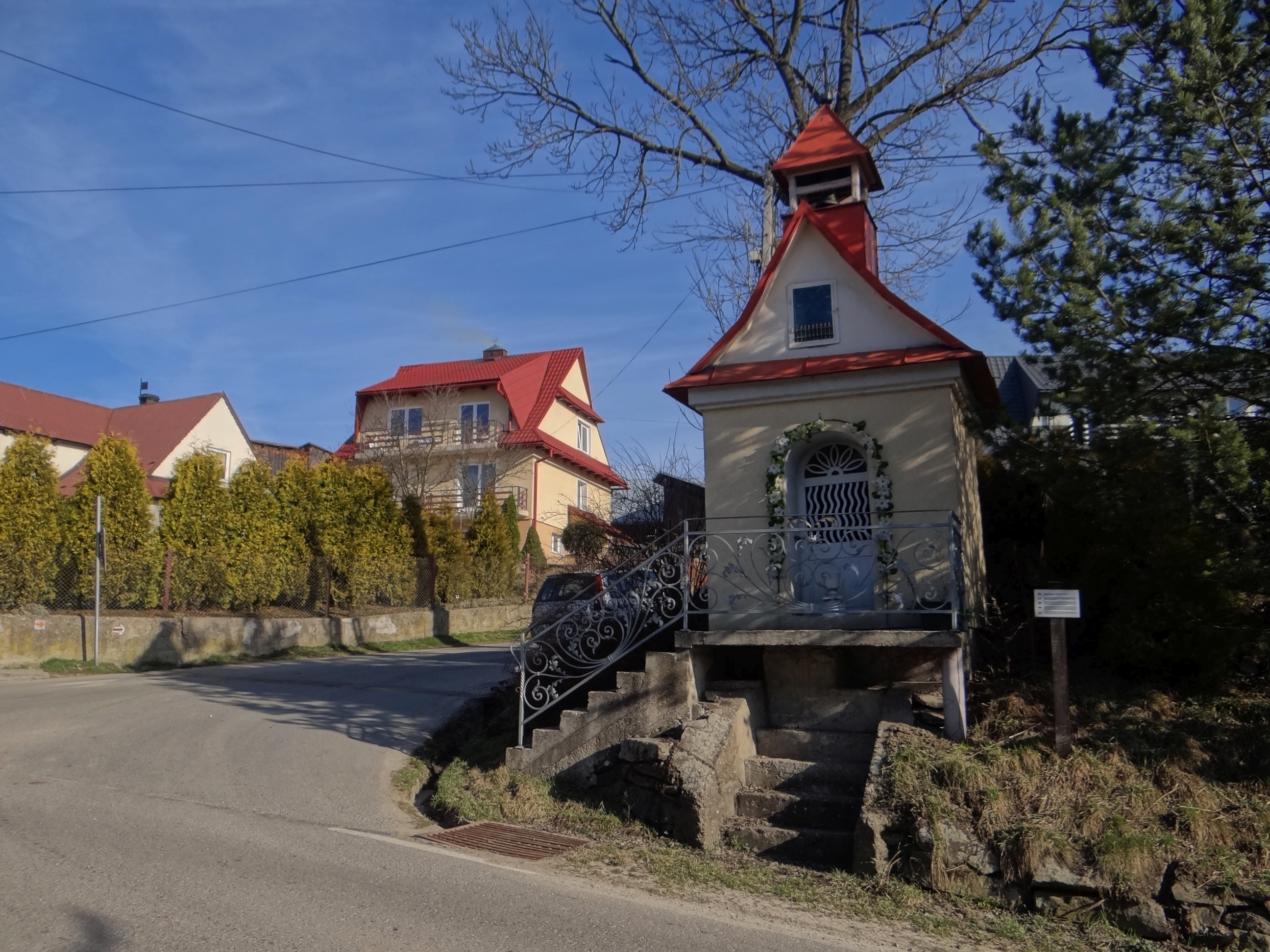

- Location within Poland
- Coordinates: 49°29′N 19°58′E
- Country: Poland
- Voivodeship: Lesser Poland
- County: Nowy Targ
- Gmina: Nowy Targ
- Population (approx.): 687 (in 2,004)

Krauszów [ˈkrau̯ʂuf] is a village in the administrative district of Gmina Nowy Targ, within Nowy Targ County, Lesser Poland Voivodeship, in southern Poland.

The village has an approximate population of 700.
