= Rogoźnik, Lesser Poland Voivodeship =

Rogoźnik
- Village
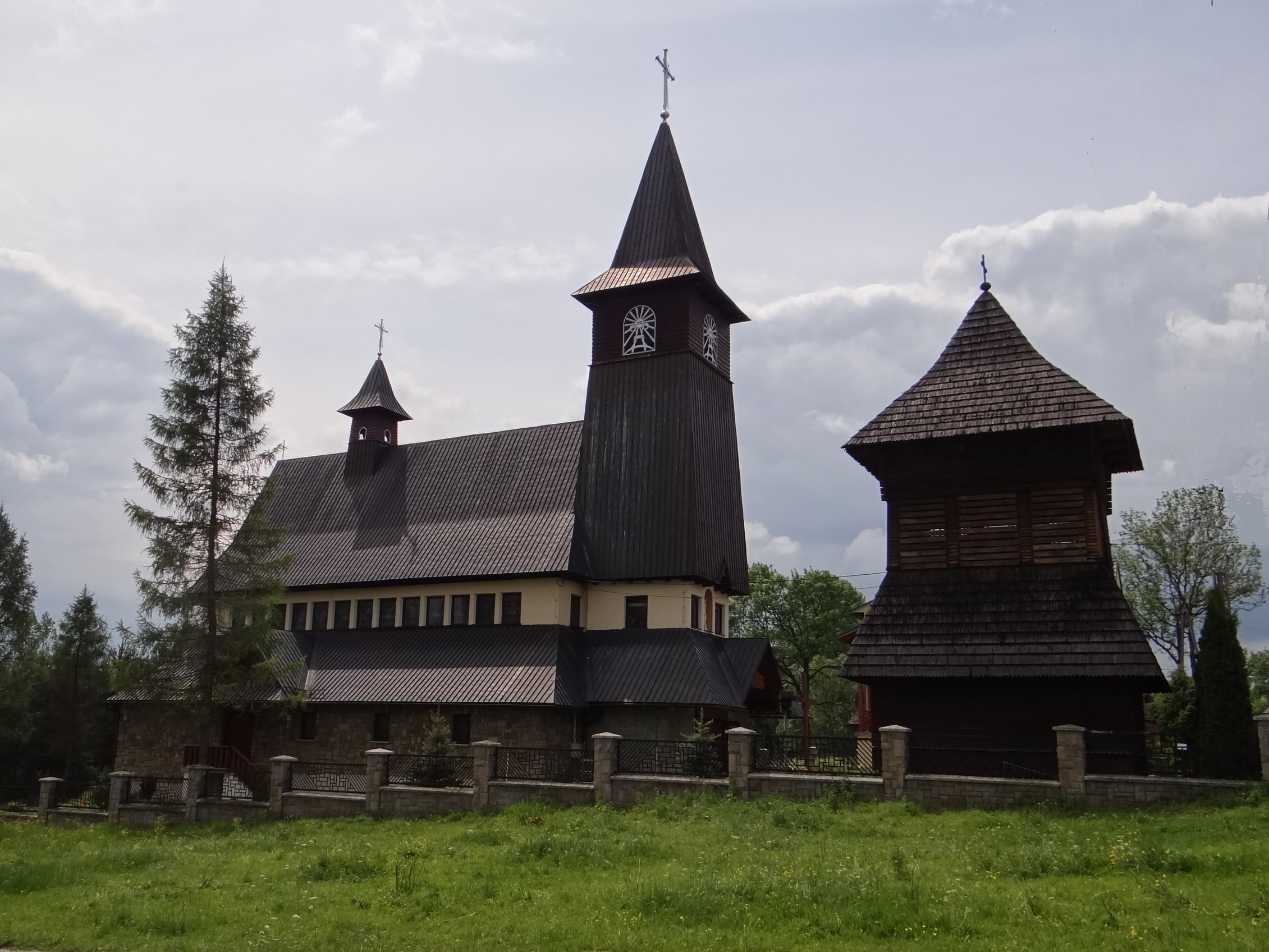
- Local Catholic church

- Location within Poland
- Coordinates: 49°26′38″N 19°56′13″E
- Country: Poland
- Voivodeship: Lesser Poland
- County: Nowy Targ
- Gmina: Nowy Targ
- Population: 840

Rogoźnik [rɔˈɡɔʑnik] is a village in the administrative district of Gmina Nowy Targ, within Nowy Targ County, Lesser Poland Voivodeship, in southern Poland.
