= Ostrowsko, Lesser Poland Voivodeship =

Ostrowsko
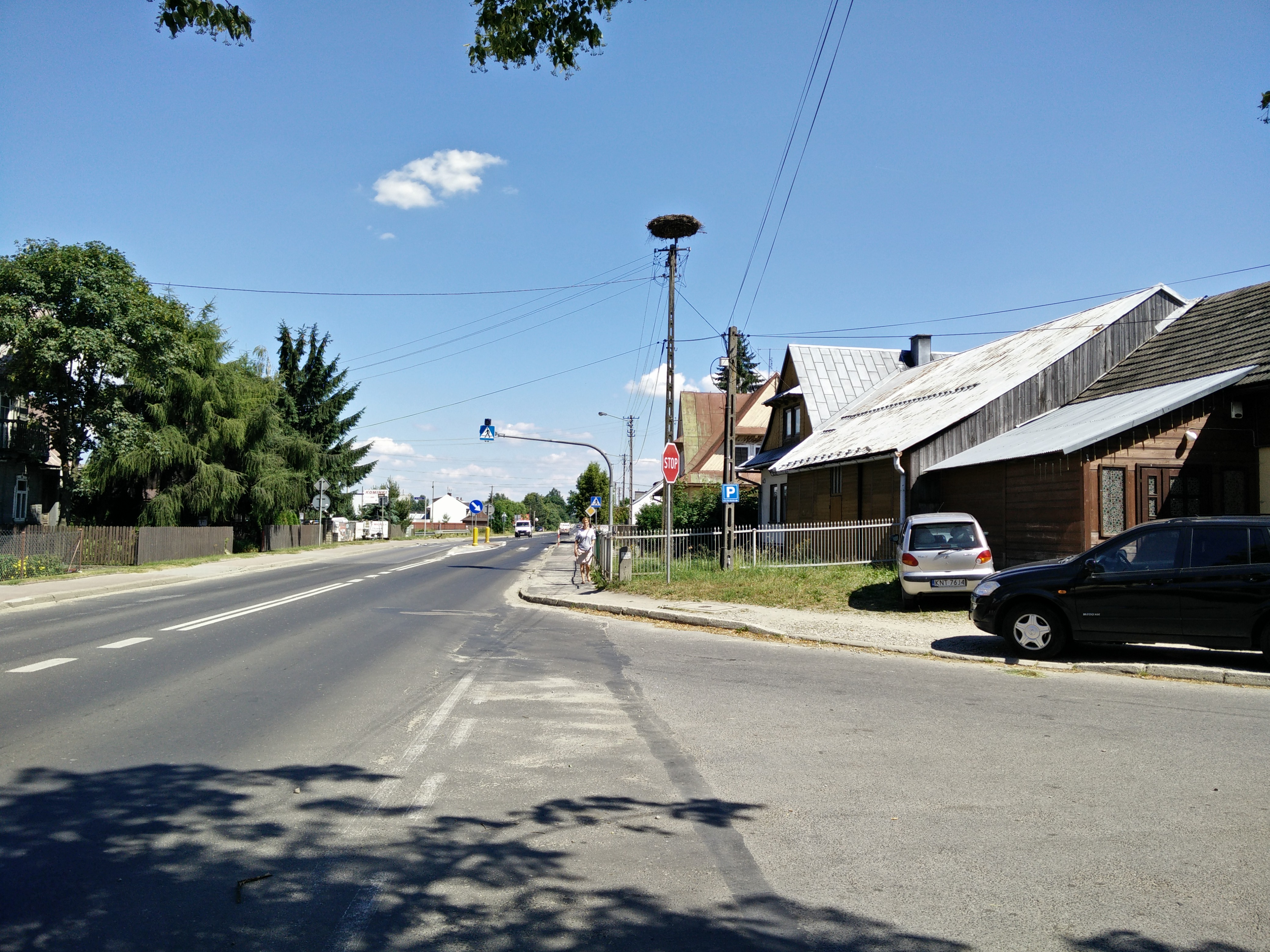

- Location within Poland
- Coordinates: 49°29′00″N 20°06′00″E
- Country: Poland
- Voivodeship: Lesser Poland
- County: Nowy Targ
- Gmina: Nowy Targ

Population
  - Total: 1,200
- Time zone: UTC+1 (CET)
  - Summer (DST): UTC+2 (CEST)
- Area code: +48 18
- Car plates: KNT

Ostrowsko [ɔsˈtrɔfskɔ] is a village in Poland, in Lesser Poland Voivodeship, Nowy Targ County. In the years 1975-1998 it was in the Nowy Sącz Voivodeship. Ostrowsko is on the road from Nowy Targ to Czorsztyn and is located by the Dunajec River.
