= Lasek, Lesser Poland Voivodeship =

Lasek
- Village
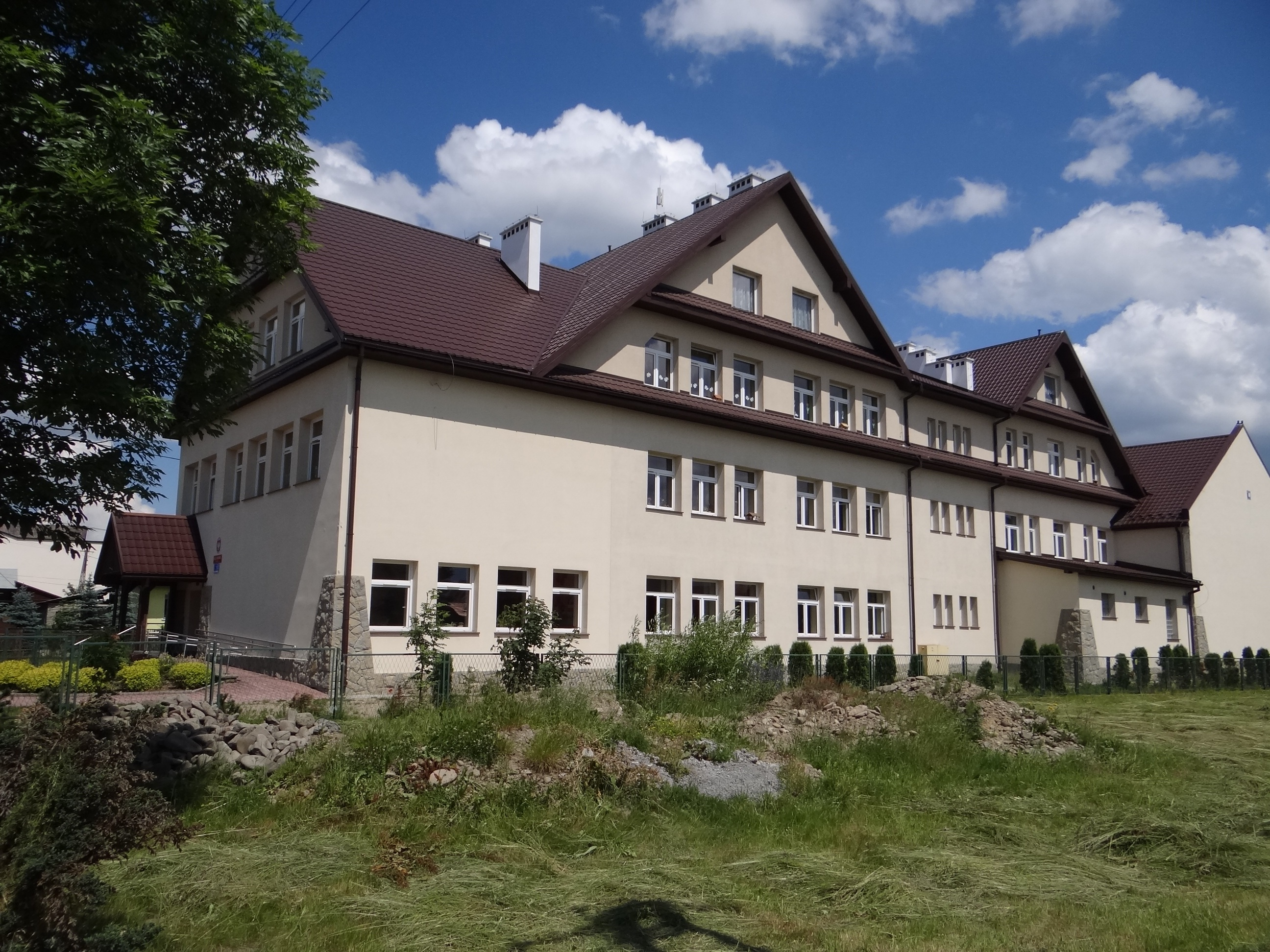
- School

- Location within Poland
- Coordinates: 49°31′N 19°59′E
- Country: Poland
- Voivodeship: Lesser Poland
- County: Nowy Targ
- Gmina: Nowy Targ
- Population: 1,000

Lasek [ˈlasɛk] is a village in the administrative district of Gmina Nowy Targ, within Nowy Targ County, Lesser Poland Voivodeship, in southern Poland.
