= Łopuszna =

- Village
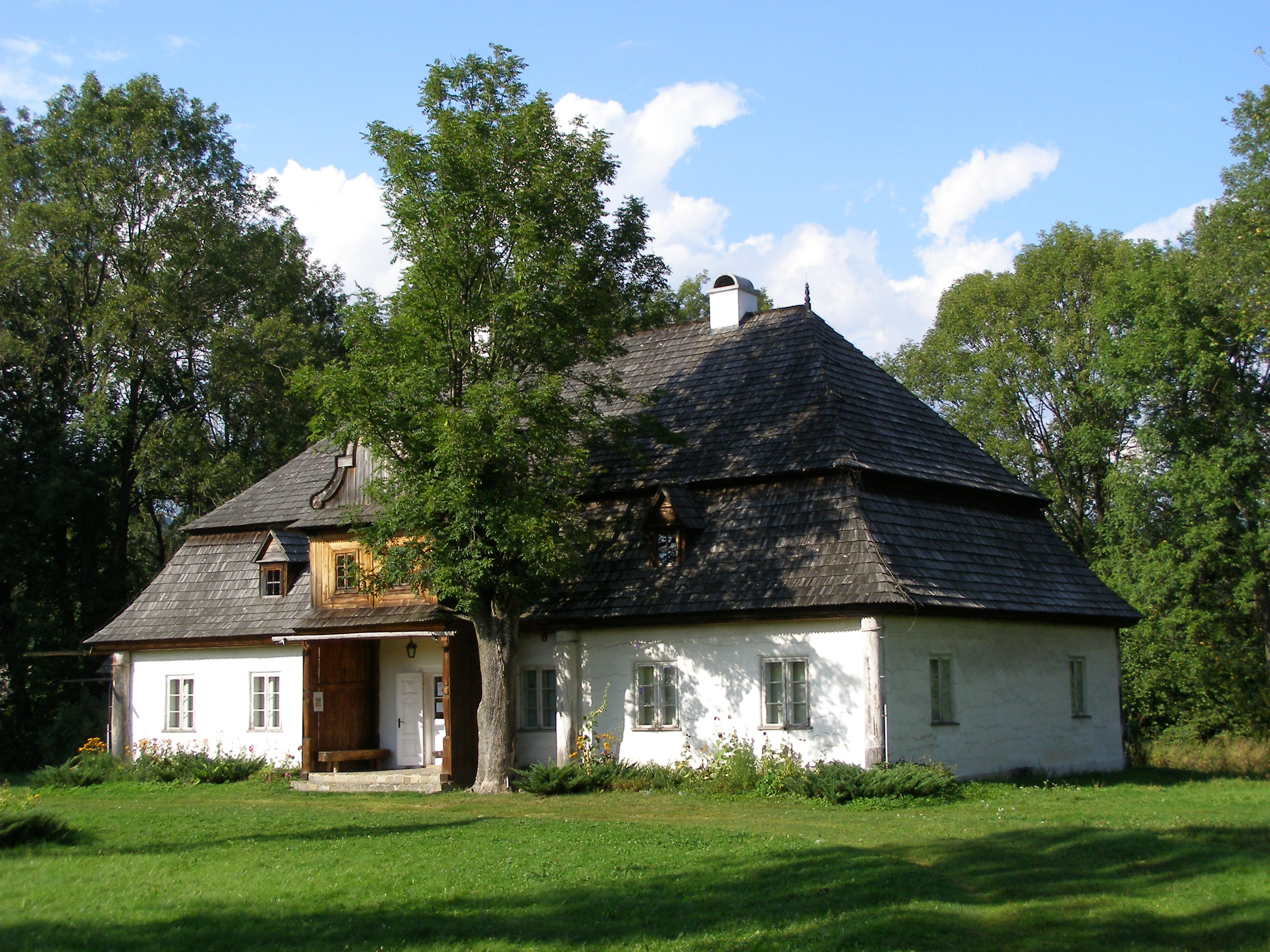
- Dwór Tetmajerów, 1790

- Location within Poland
- Coordinates: 49°29′N 20°8′E
- Country: Poland
- Voivodeship: Lesser Poland
- County: Nowy Targ
- Gmina: Nowy Targ
- Population: 1,300

Łopuszna [wɔˈpuʂna] is a village in the administrative district of Gmina Nowy Targ, within Nowy Targ County, Lesser Poland Voivodeship, in southern Poland. The village, with a population of about 1,300 lies on the Dunajec river, at the foot of the Gorce Mountains.

Łopuszna is the location of the Dwór Tetmajerów manor house built around 1790 (pictured); which serves as branch of the Tatra Muzeum in Zakopane since 1978.

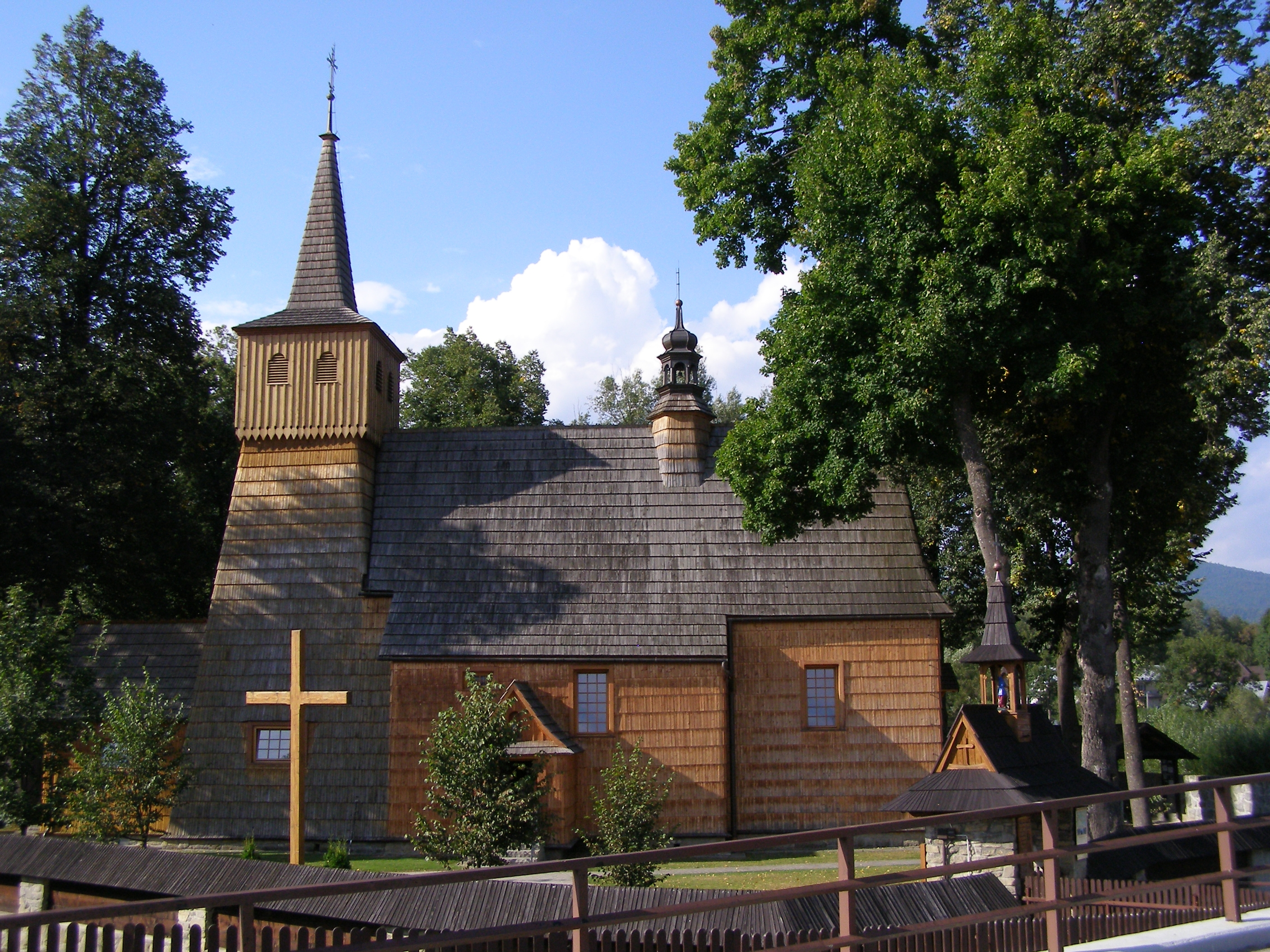
Historic, Holy Trinity wooden church in Łopuszna, consecrated in 1504
