= Dursztyn =

- Village
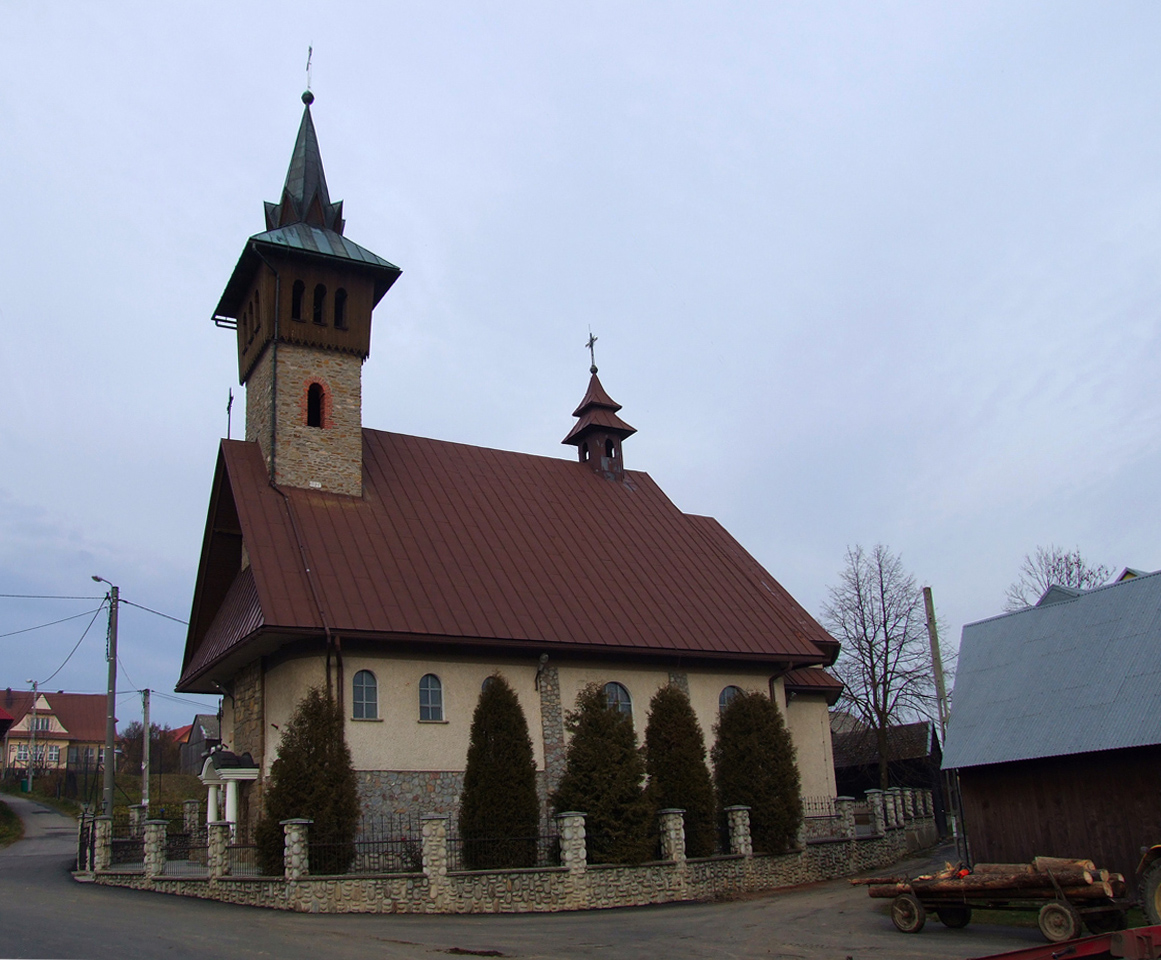
- St. John the Baptist Parish Church in Dursztyn

- Location within Poland
- Coordinates: 49°25′N 20°12′E
- Country: Poland
- Voivodeship: Lesser Poland
- County: Nowy Targ
- Gmina: Nowy Targ
- Population: 450

Dursztyn [ˈdurʂtɨn] (Slovak: Durštín; Hungarian: Derzsény) is a village in the administrative district of Gmina Nowy Targ, within Nowy Targ County, Lesser Poland Voivodeship, in southern Poland.

It is one of the 14 villages in the Polish part of the historical region of Spiš (Polish: Spisz). It was first mentioned in a written document in 1317 as Durst.
