= Gronków =

- Village
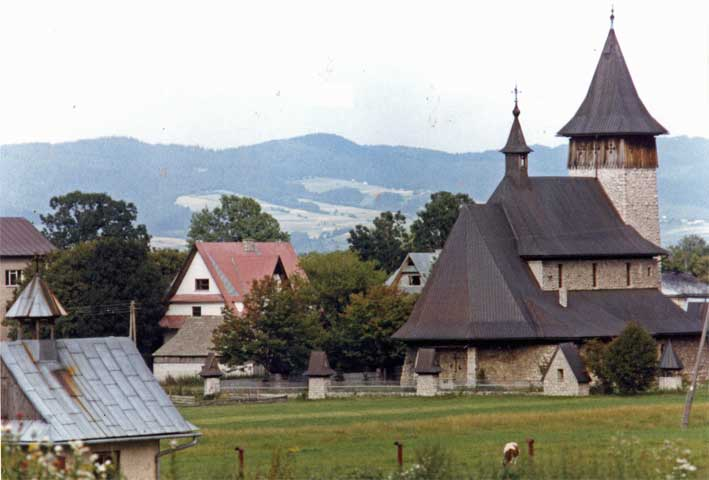
- Church of the Immaculate Heart of Blessed Virgin Mary

- Location within Poland
- Coordinates: 49°26′N 20°5′E
- Country: Poland
- Voivodeship: Lesser Poland
- County: Nowy Targ
- Gmina: Nowy Targ

Gronków [ˈɡrɔnkuf] is a village in the administrative district of Gmina Nowy Targ, within Nowy Targ County, Lesser Poland Voivodeship, in southern Poland.
