= Harklowa, Lesser Poland Voivodeship =

Harklowa
- Village
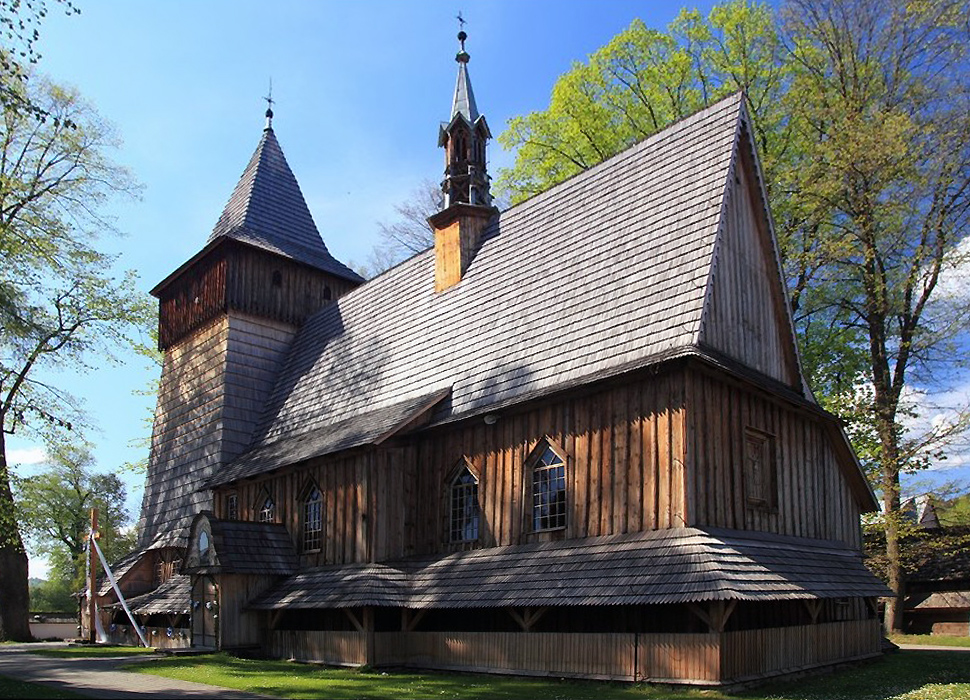
- Birth of the Virgin Mary Church

- Location within Poland
- Coordinates: 49°28′N 20°10′E
- Country: Poland
- Voivodeship: Lesser Poland
- County: Nowy Targ
- Gmina: Nowy Targ
- Elevation: 638 m (2,093 ft)
- Population: 412

Harklowa [xarˈklɔva] is a village in the administrative district of Gmina Nowy Targ, within Nowy Targ County, Lesser Poland Voivodeship, in southern Poland.
