= Białka Gorge near Krempachy =

Nature reserve in Poland

Coordinates: 49.4289°N 20.1289°E

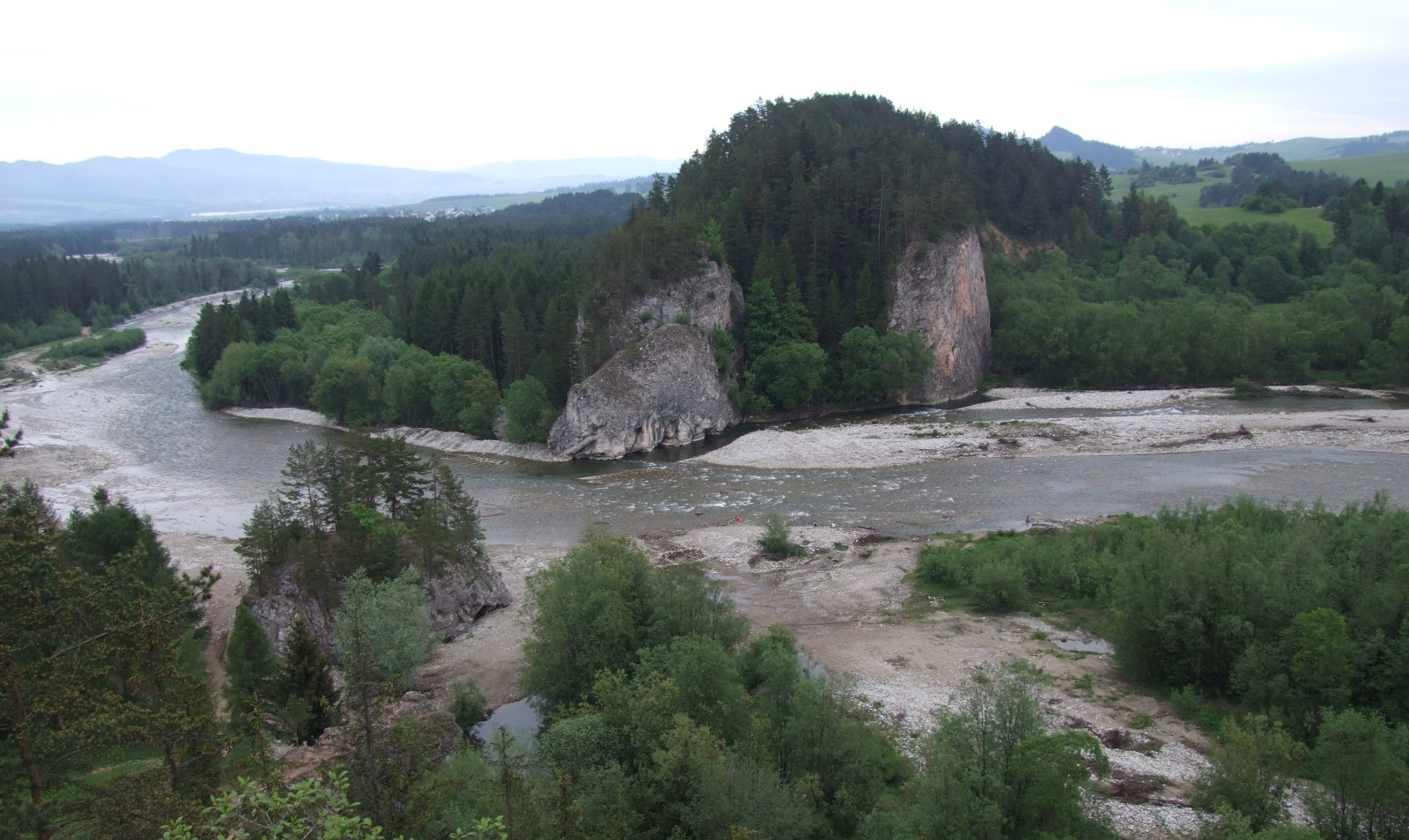
Białka River Gorge – view from Obłazowa Cave

The Białka Gorge near Krempachy (Polish: Przełom Białki, literally "Białka River Gorge") is a landscape nature reserve in the Lesser Poland Voivodeship, in Nowy Targ County. It is located in the towns of Krempachy and Nowa Biała (Nowy Targ commune), a small part of it also lies in the town of Trybsz (Łapsze Niżne commune). It is the gorge of the Białka river.

The reserve lies within the boundaries of the Southern Małopolska Protected Landscape Area and the Białka Valley Natura 2000 habitat area PLH120024 (Dolina Białki).
