= Renata Kałuża =

Polish para-cyclist (born 1981)

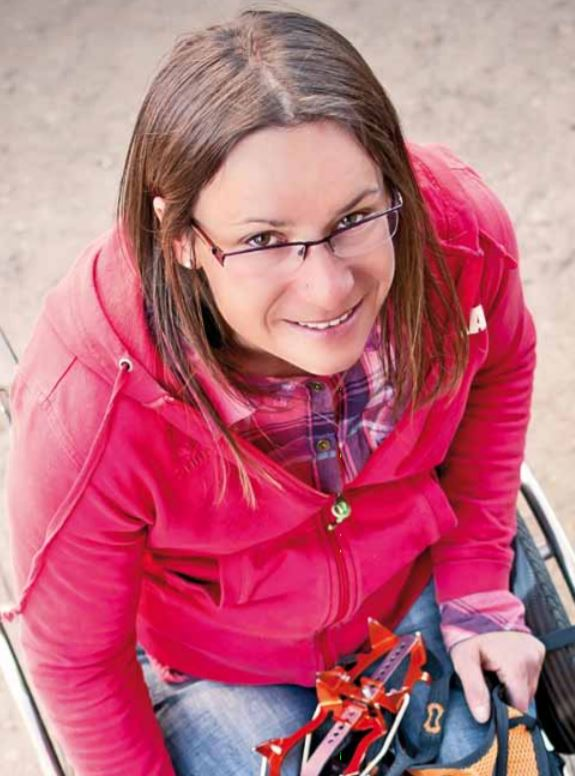

Personal information
- Nationality: Polish
- Born: 28 April 1981 (age 45) Czarny Dunajec, Poland

Sport
- Sport: Para-cycling
- Disability class: H3
Medal record
Women's Para-cycling
Representing Poland
Paralympic Games
Bronze medal – third place	2020 Tokyo	Road time trial H1–3
Road World Championships
Bronze medal – third place	2021 Cascais	Time trial (H3)

Renata Kałuża (born 28 April 1981) is a Polish para-cyclist and former mountaineer who represented Poland in the 2020 Summer Paralympics.

== Career ==
On 13 March 2007 Kałuża had an accident while climbing in Przełom Białki near Krempachy, which left her permanently paralyzed from the chest down. Since then, she has been using a wheelchair and turned to para-cycling.

Kałuża represented Poland in the women's road time trial H1–3 event at the 2020 Summer Paralympics and won a bronze medal.
