= Obłazowa Cave =

Cave and archaeological site in Poland

- Jaskinia Obłazowa
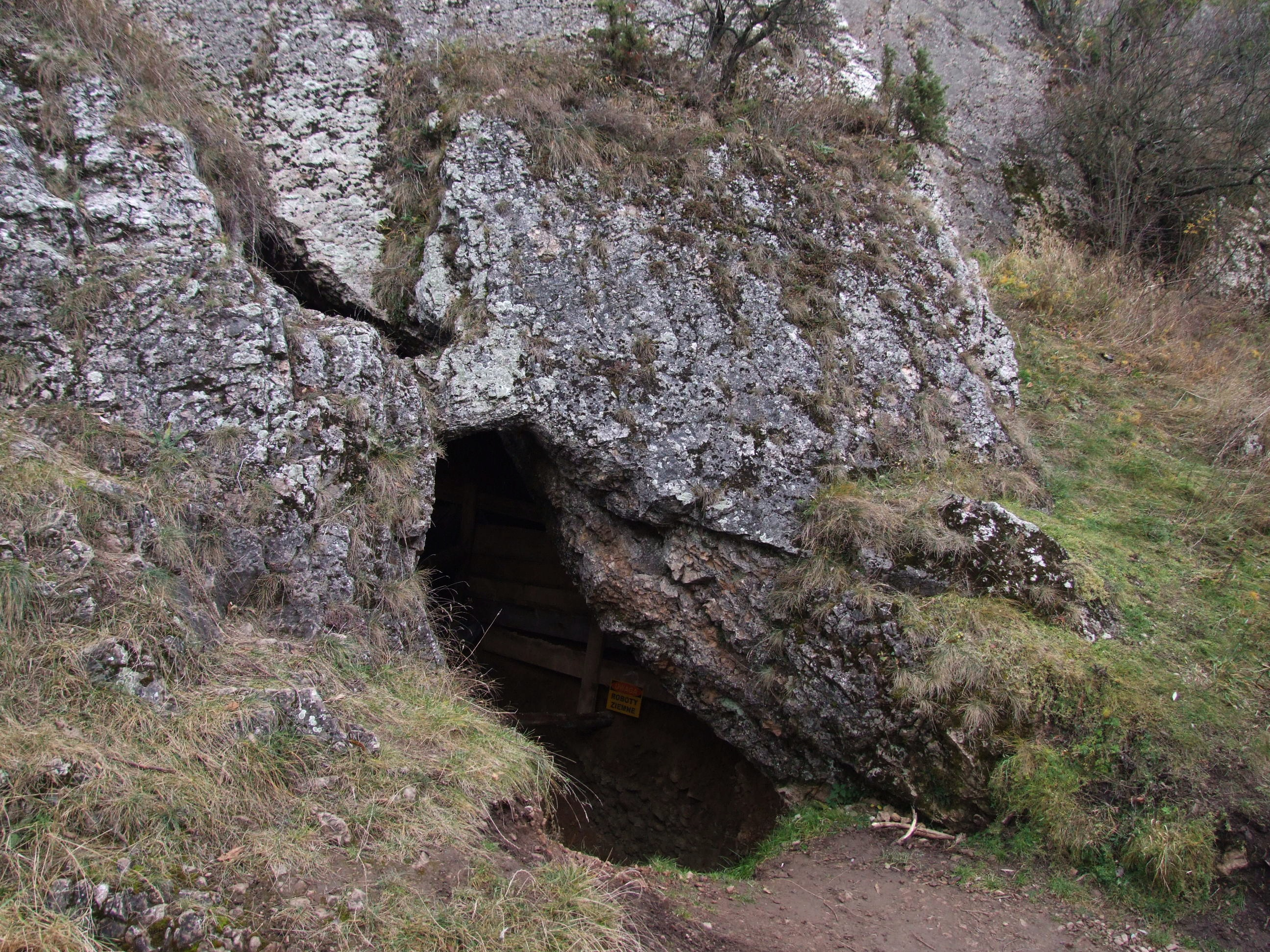
- Entrance to the cave

- Location in Poland
- 49°25′43.27″N 20°7′32.71″E

Obłazowa Cave is a cave situated in the nature reserve of Przełom Białki at Nowa Biała near Krempachy, Gmina Nowy Targ in Lesser Poland Voivodeship, southern Poland. The cave has a 9 m-long (30 ft) chamber to which a short corridor leads. It is one of the most important Paleolithic sites in Poland.

== Archaeological research ==
Excavations at the Obłazowa Cave started in 1985 by a team of archaeologists led by professor Paweł Valde-Nowak of the Institute of Archaeology at the Jagiellonian University in Kraków. Research has shown that Obłazowa Cave was inhabited by humans at several periods. Scientists distinguished ten layers of occupation, six associated with the presence of Neanderthals and the remaining four showing activities of modern humans. In the upper layers an iron arrowhead, a crossbow and pieces of ceramics from the late Middle Ages were found.

=== Layer VIII ===
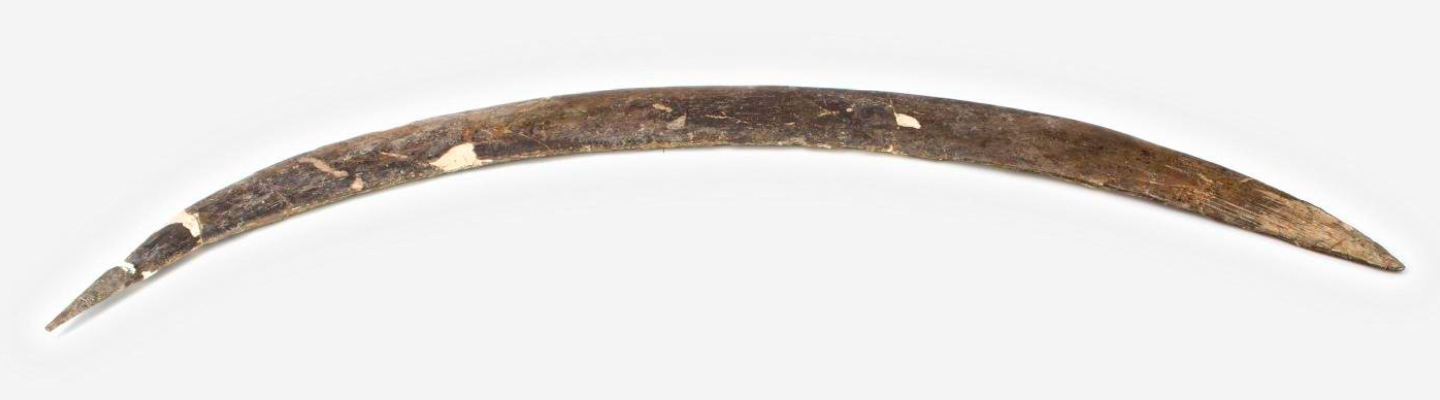
A boomerang made from a mammoth tusk found in the Obłazowa Cave.

The most important artifacts were discovered in layer VIII, associated with modern Homo sapiens and dated to about 30,000 BP. From this layer scientists excavated the oldest boomerang in the world, made from a mammoth tusk and the oldest bones of Homo sapiens in Poland (two finger bones). The layer also contained two antler wedges, pendants made of perforated canine teeth of fox or arctic fox, bone beads, a pendant of unknown purpose, possibly a whistle, made of a perforated cone snail shell on which traces of ochre were found. The tool inventory of layer VIII contained a wide range of raw material: Jurassic Kraków flint, chocolate flint, both imported from northern regions, local radiolarite, and rock crystal probably from northern Slovakia. Some of the stone tools were made of raw material imported from a great distance. The most impressive findings like the boomerang and human bones were located in a circle made of granite and quartzite pebbles. Because of the arrangement of the artifacts and their great value this is interpreted as a place of some cult or ritual. The presence of human bones may suggest a partial or symbolic burial or some kind of sacrifice.

The site contains a number of other important archaeological findings as well as a rich and diversified fauna of mollusks, amphibians, reptiles, birds and small and large mammals of the Late Pleistocene Age.

Before the discoveries in the Obłazowa Cave all Carpathian Paleolithic sites were dated to the Late Paleolithic. No traces of earlier settlements were apparent. This situation has changed with the discovery of the Middle Paleolithic sequence in the Obłazowa Cave.

== Sightseeing ==
The cave is open to visitors, but in the near future it will be secured with bars to protect the archaeological layers. In 2017 the Nowy Targ commune office started working on a project whose goal is to create an Obłazowa Cave Archaeological Park to present the results of years of research to the public.

== Bibliography ==
- Valde-Nowak, Paweł, Nadachowski Adam, Madeyska Teresa (2003):Obłazowa Cave: Human Activity, Stratigraphy and Palaeoenvironment. Institute of archeology and Ethnology Polish Academy of Sciences. ISBN 83-908823-7-X.
- Valde- Nowak, Paweł (2009): Obłazowa and Hłomcza: Two Paleolithic sites in the North Carparthians province of Southern Poland. In Adams, Brian; S. Blades, Brooke (Eds.), Lithic Materials and Palolithic Societies (pp. 196– 207). Wiley-Blackwell. ISBN 978-1-405-16837-3.
