= Białka (Dunajec) =

Białka Biela voda
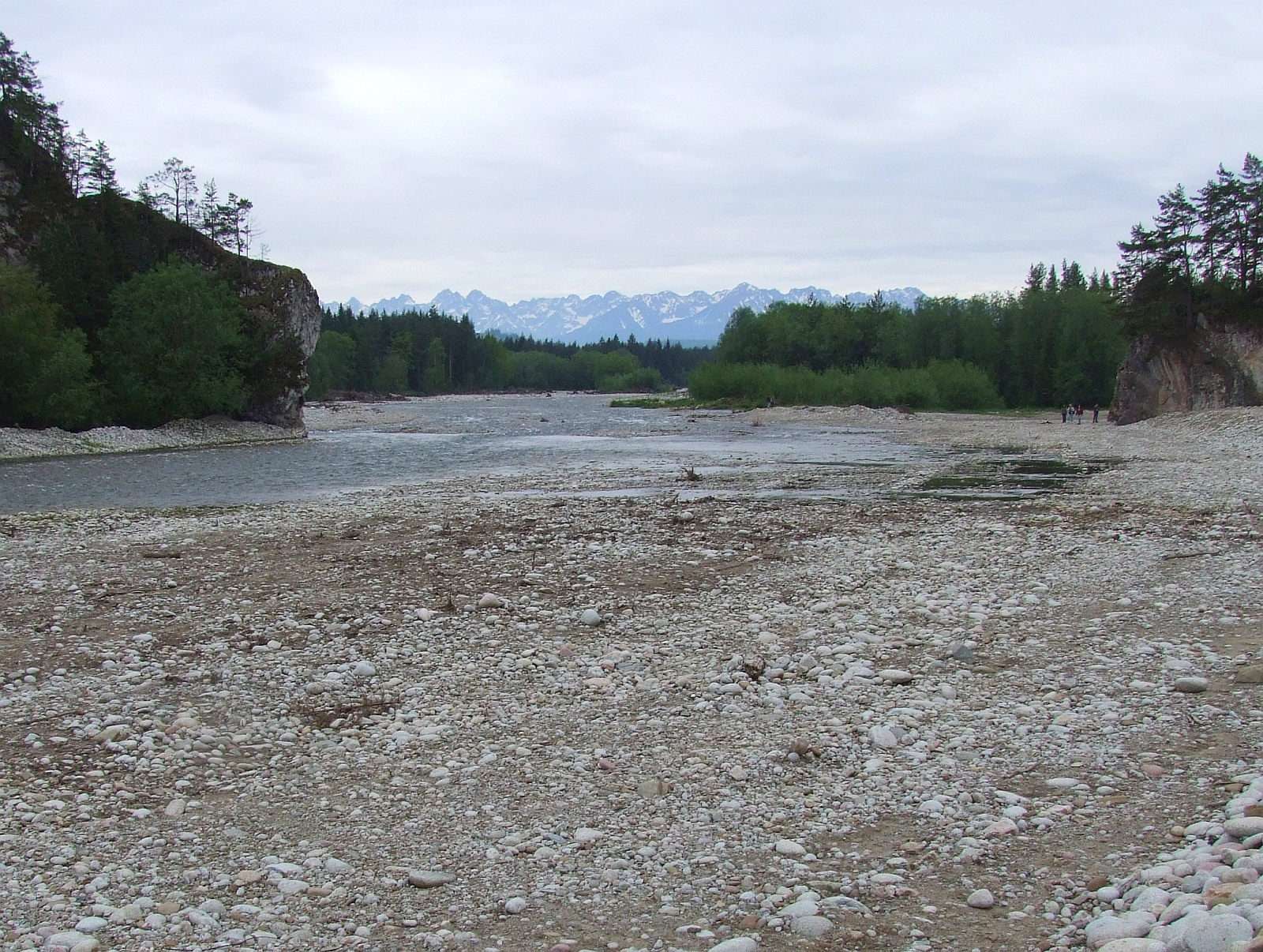
- The Białka river near the village of Krempachy not far from Nowy Targ

Location
- Country: Poland, Slovakia

Physical characteristics
- Mouth
  - location: Dunajec
  - coordinates: 49°27′36″N 20°13′19″E

Basin features
- Progression: Dunajec→ Vistula→ Baltic Sea

The Białka or Biela voda is a mountain river running through southern Poland. It is a tributary of the Dunajec River. The Białka is only about 40 km long, part of which forms the border with Slovakia. The source of the river is in the High Tatras.

The towns and townships located on or near the Białka River include: Jurgów, Białka Tatrzańska, Trybsz, Krempachy, Dębno, and Frydman.
