= Huba =

Huba may refer to:

- Huba (name)
- Huba, Lesser Poland Voivodeship, a village in Poland
- Huba language, a language of Nigeria
