= Mizerna =

- Village
- Location within Poland
- Coordinates: 49°28′N 20°18′E
- Country: Poland
- Voivodeship: Lesser Poland
- County: Nowy Targ
- Gmina: Czorsztyn

Population
  - Total: 520

Mizerna [miˈzɛrna] is a village in the administrative district of Gmina Czorsztyn, within Nowy Targ County, Lesser Poland Voivodeship, in southern Poland, close to the border with Slovakia.

The population of the village is 520.
