= Łapsze Niżne =

- Village
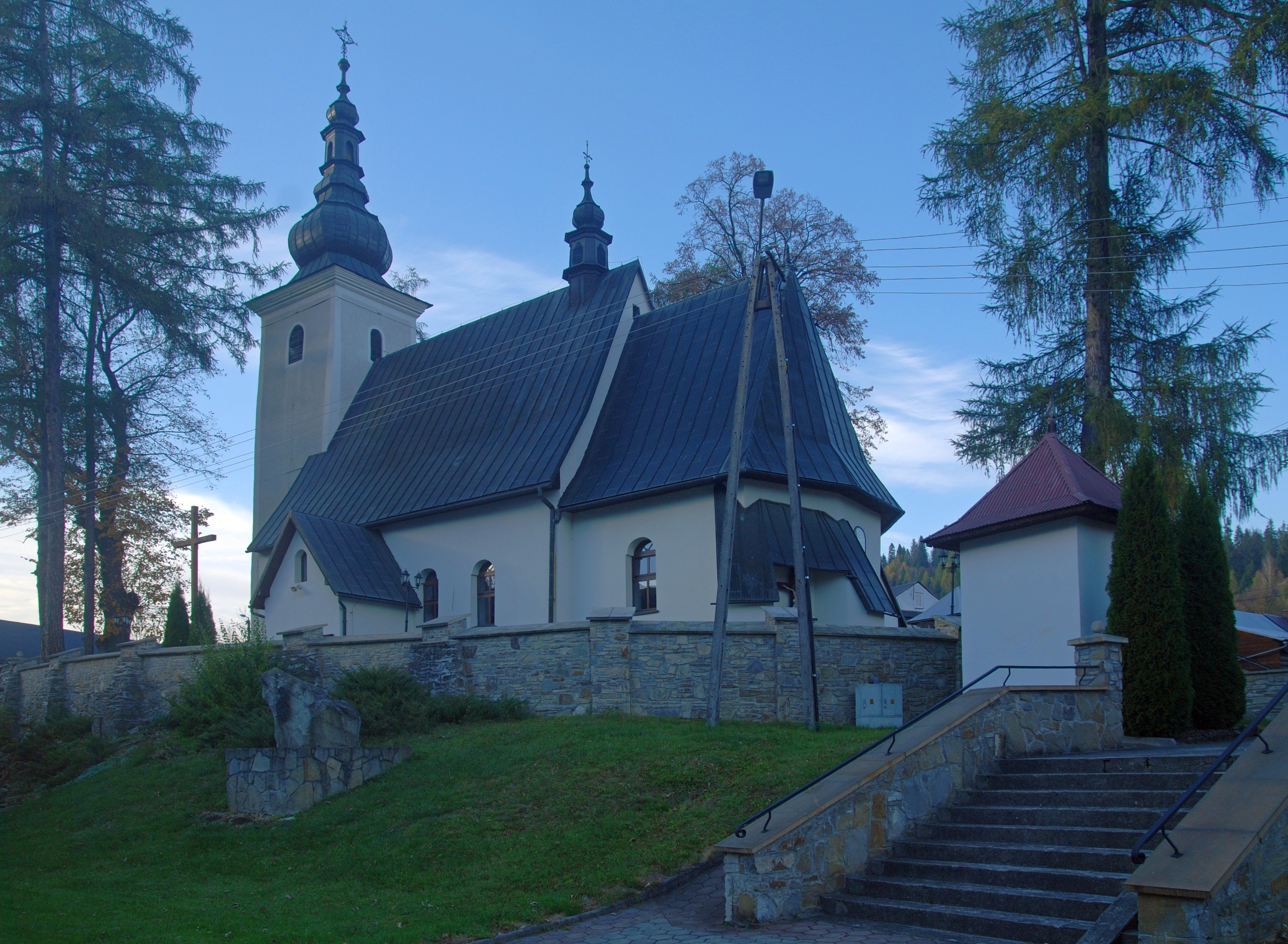
- Church of Saint Quirinus

- Location within Poland
- Coordinates: 49°24′N 20°15′E
- Country: Poland
- Voivodeship: Lesser Poland
- County: Nowy Targ
- Gmina: Łapsze Niżne
- First mentioned: 1274

Population
  - Total: 1,400

Łapsze Niżne [ˈwapʂɛ ˈniʐnɛ] (Slovak: Nižné Lapše) is a village in Nowy Targ County, Lesser Poland Voivodeship, in southern Poland, close to the border with Slovakia. It is the seat of the gmina (administrative district) called Gmina Łapsze Niżne.

It is one of the 14 villages in the Polish part of the historical region of Spiš (Polish: Spisz). Łapsze Niżne (where Niżne means Lower, as it lays lower in the valley) is the older village from the sister settlement Łapsze Wyżne (where Wyżne means Upper). The local parish was first mentioned in 1274.
