= Cycling at the 2020 Summer Paralympics – Women's road time trial H1–3 =

Women's road time trial H1–3 at the XVI Paralympic Games
- Venue: Fuji Speedway
- Dates: 31 August
- Competitors: 11 from 11 nations
- Winning time: 32:46.97

Medalists
1st place, gold medalist(s)		Annika Zeyen	Germany
2nd place, silver medalist(s)		Francesca Porcellato	Italy
3rd place, bronze medalist(s)		Renata Kałuża	Poland

The women's road time trial H1–3 road cycling event at the 2020 Summer Paralympics took place on 31 August 2021, at Fuji Speedway, Tokyo. 11 riders competed in the event.

The event covers the following three classifications, that all use hand-operated bicycles:

- H1: tetraplegics with severe upper limb impairment to the C6 vertebra.
- H2: tetraplegics with minor upper limb impairment from C7 thru T3.
- H3: paraplegics with impairment from T4 thru T10.

== Results ==
The event took place on 31 August 2021, at 10:35:

Rank	Rider	Nationality	Class	Time	Deficit
1st place, gold medalist(s)	Annika Zeyen	Germany	H3	32:46.97	
2nd place, silver medalist(s)	Francesca Porcellato	Italy	H3	33:30.52	+43.55
3rd place, bronze medalist(s)	Renata Kałuża	Poland	H3	33:50.32	+1:03.35
4	Anna Oroszová	Slovakia	H3	35:36.37	+2:49.40
5	Kateřina Antošová	Czech Republic	H3	35:39.64	+2:52.67
6	Alicia Dana	United States	H3	37:09.19	+4:22.22
7	Jady Martins Malavazzi	Brazil	H3	38:11.10	+5:24.13
8	Laurence VandeVyver	Belgium	H3	41:07.14	+8:20.17
9	Gyeonghwa Lee	South Korea	H3	42:14.22	+9:27.25
10	Elisabeth Egger	Austria	H3	46:02.84	+13:15.87
11	Arna Albertsdóttir	Iceland	H3	48:22.33	+15:35.36
