= Kacwin =

- Village
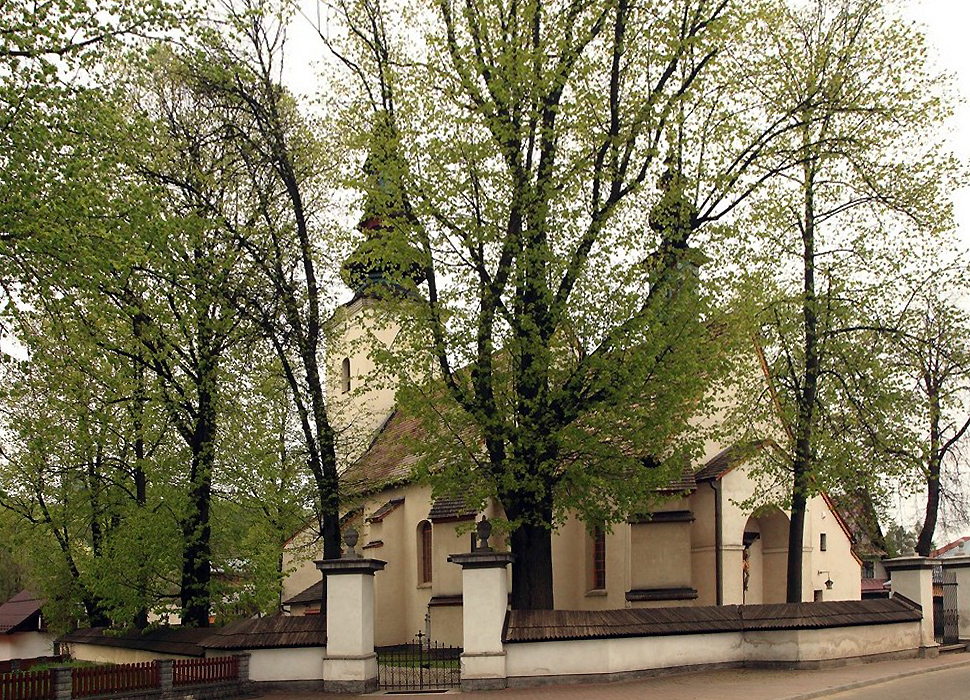
- All Saints Church

- Location within Poland
- Coordinates: 49°22′N 20°17′E
- Country: Poland
- Voivodeship: Lesser Poland
- County: Nowy Targ
- Gmina: Łapsze Niżne
- Highest elevation: 980 m (3,220 ft)
- Lowest elevation: 530 m (1,740 ft)
- Population: 980

Kacwin [ˈkat͡sfin] (Slovak: Kacvín, Hungarian: Szentmindszent) is a village in the administrative district of Gmina Łapsze Niżne, within Nowy Targ County, Lesser Poland Voivodeship, in southern Poland, close to the border with Slovakia.

It is one of the 14 villages in the Polish part of the historical region of Spiš (Polish: Spisz).
