= Falsztyn =

- Village
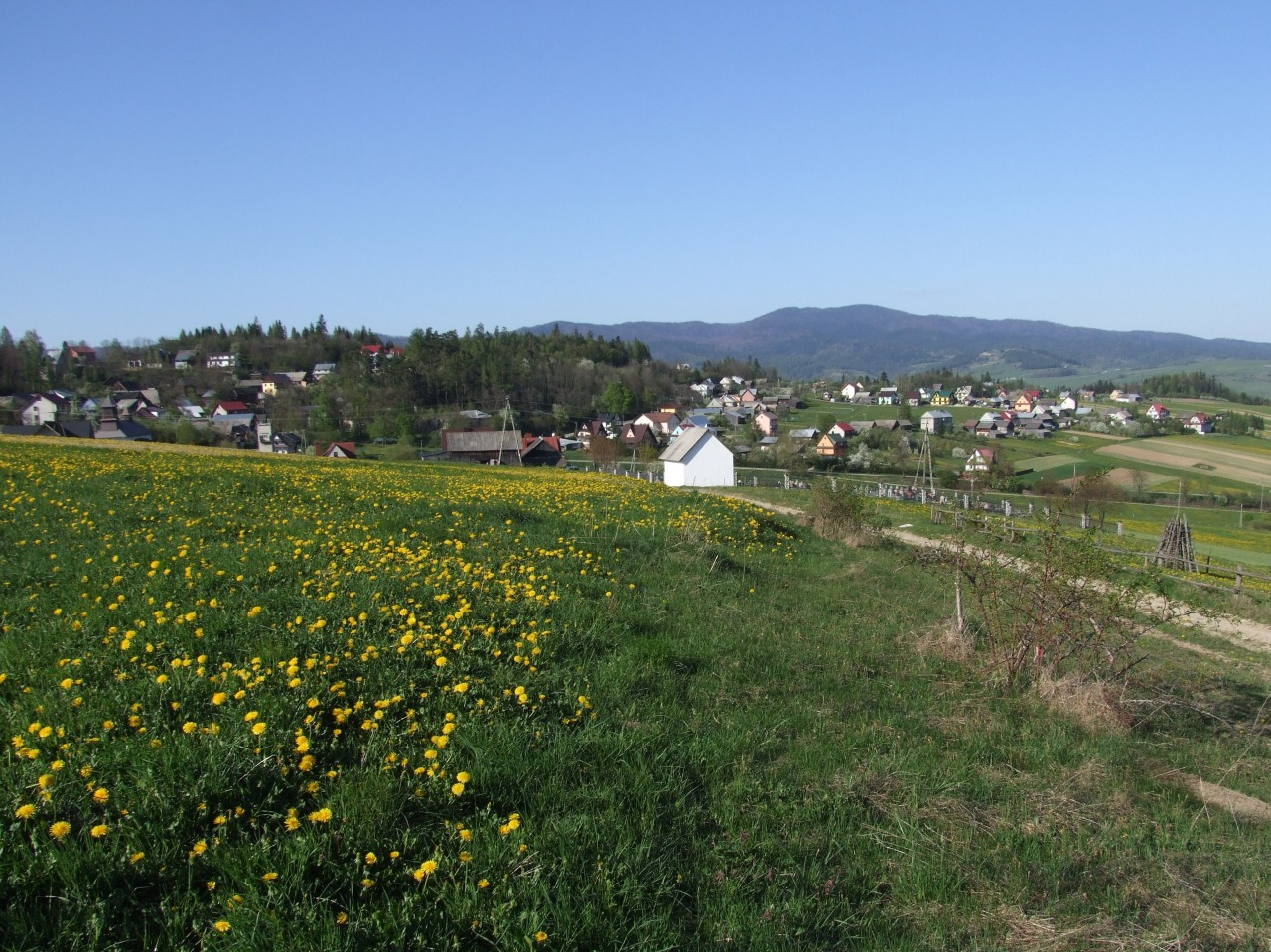
- Falsztyn

- Location within Poland
- Coordinates: 49°25′39″N 20°16′27″E
- Country: Poland
- Voivodeship: Lesser Poland
- County: Nowy Targ
- Gmina: Łapsze Niżne
- Population: 290

Falsztyn [ˈfalʂtɨn] (Slovak: Falštín) is a village in the administrative district of Gmina Łapsze Niżne, within Nowy Targ County, Lesser Poland Voivodeship, in southern Poland, close to the border with Slovakia.

It is one of the 14 villages in the Polish part of the historical region of Spiš (Polish: Spisz). It was probably established in the 15th century. Construction of a local castle named Falkenstein (German Falken + stein) commenced in 1535.
