= Łapszanka =

- Village
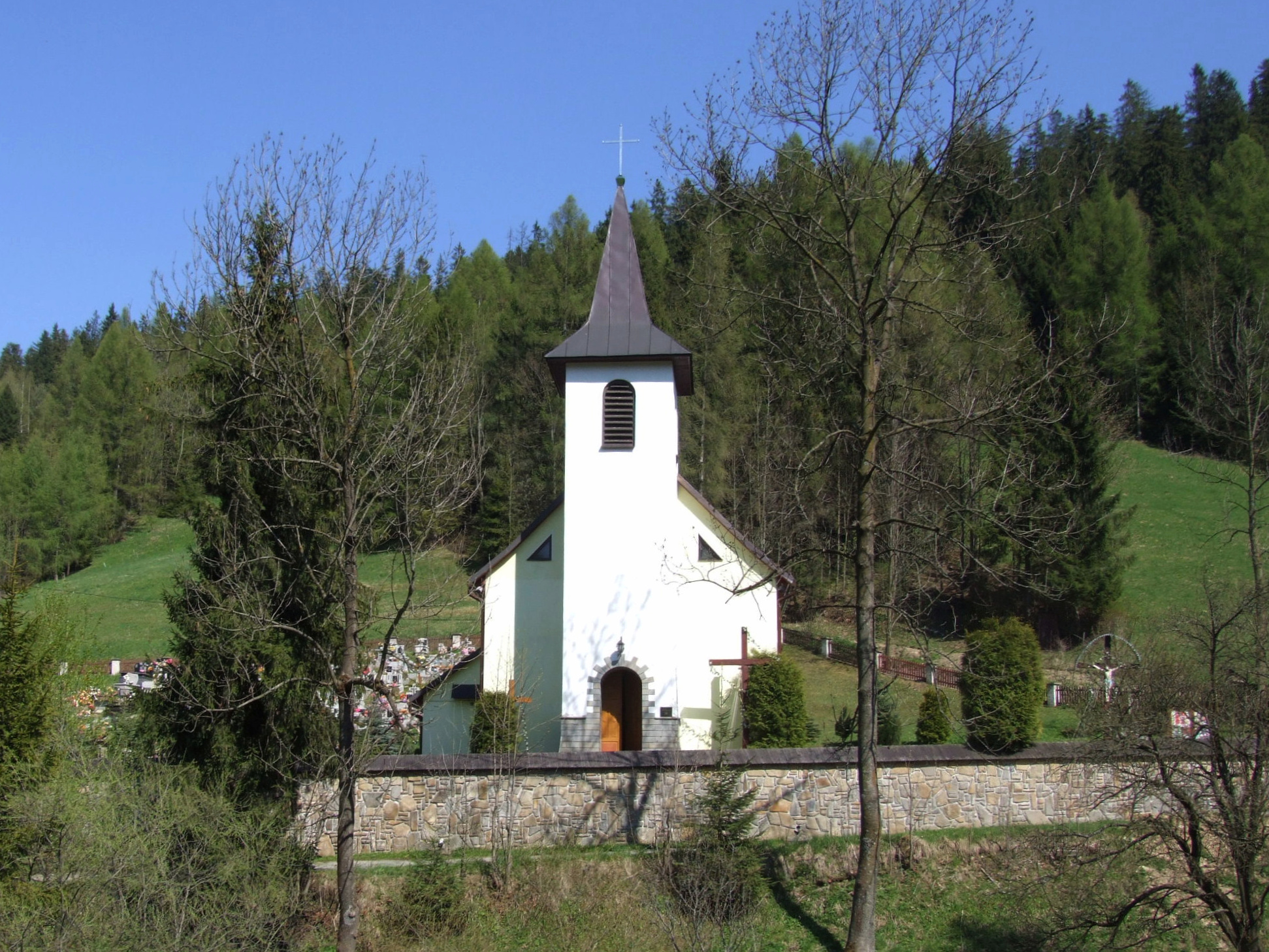
- Church

- Location within Poland
- Coordinates: 49°22′N 20°12′E
- Country: Poland
- Voivodeship: Lesser Poland
- County: Nowy Targ
- Gmina: Łapsze Niżne
- Highest elevation: 990 m (3,250 ft)
- Lowest elevation: 750 m (2,460 ft)
- Population: 400

Łapszanka [wapˈʂanka] (Slovak: Lapšanka) is a village in the administrative district of Gmina Łapsze Niżne, within Nowy Targ County, Lesser Poland Voivodeship, in southern Poland, close to the border with Slovakia.

It is one of the 14 villages in the Polish part of the historical region of Spiš (Polish: Spisz).
