= Gmina Czorsztyn =

Gmina Czorsztyn Czorsztyn Commune
- Gmina
- Coat of arms
- Interactive map of Gmina Czorsztyn
- Coordinates (Maniowy): 49°27′35″N 20°16′9″E
- Country: Poland
- Voivodeship: Lesser Poland
- County: Nowy Targ
- Seat: Maniowy

Area
  - Total: 61.72 km^{2} (23.83 sq mi)

Population (2006)
  - Total: 7,201
  - Density: 116.7/km^{2} (302.2/sq mi)
- Website: http://www.czorsztyn.pl/

Gmina Czorsztyn is a rural gmina (administrative district) in Nowy Targ County, Lesser Poland Voivodeship, in southern Poland, on the Slovak border. It takes its name from the village of Czorsztyn, its former seat (until 1993). The present seat of the gmina is Maniowy, which lies approximately 19 kilometres (12 mi) east of Nowy Targ and 71 km (44 mi) south of the regional capital Kraków.

The gmina covers an area of 61.72 square kilometres (23.8 sq mi), and as of 2006 its total population is 7,201.

== Villages ==
Gmina Czorsztyn contains the villages and settlements of Czorsztyn, Huba, Kluszkowce, Maniowy, Mizerna, Sromowce Niżne and Sromowce Wyżne.

== Neighbouring gminas ==
Gmina Czorsztyn is bordered by the gminas of Krościenko nad Dunajcem, Łapsze Niżne, Nowy Targ and Ochotnica Dolna. It also borders Slovakia.
