= Nowa Biała, Lesser Poland Voivodeship =

Nowa Biała
- Village
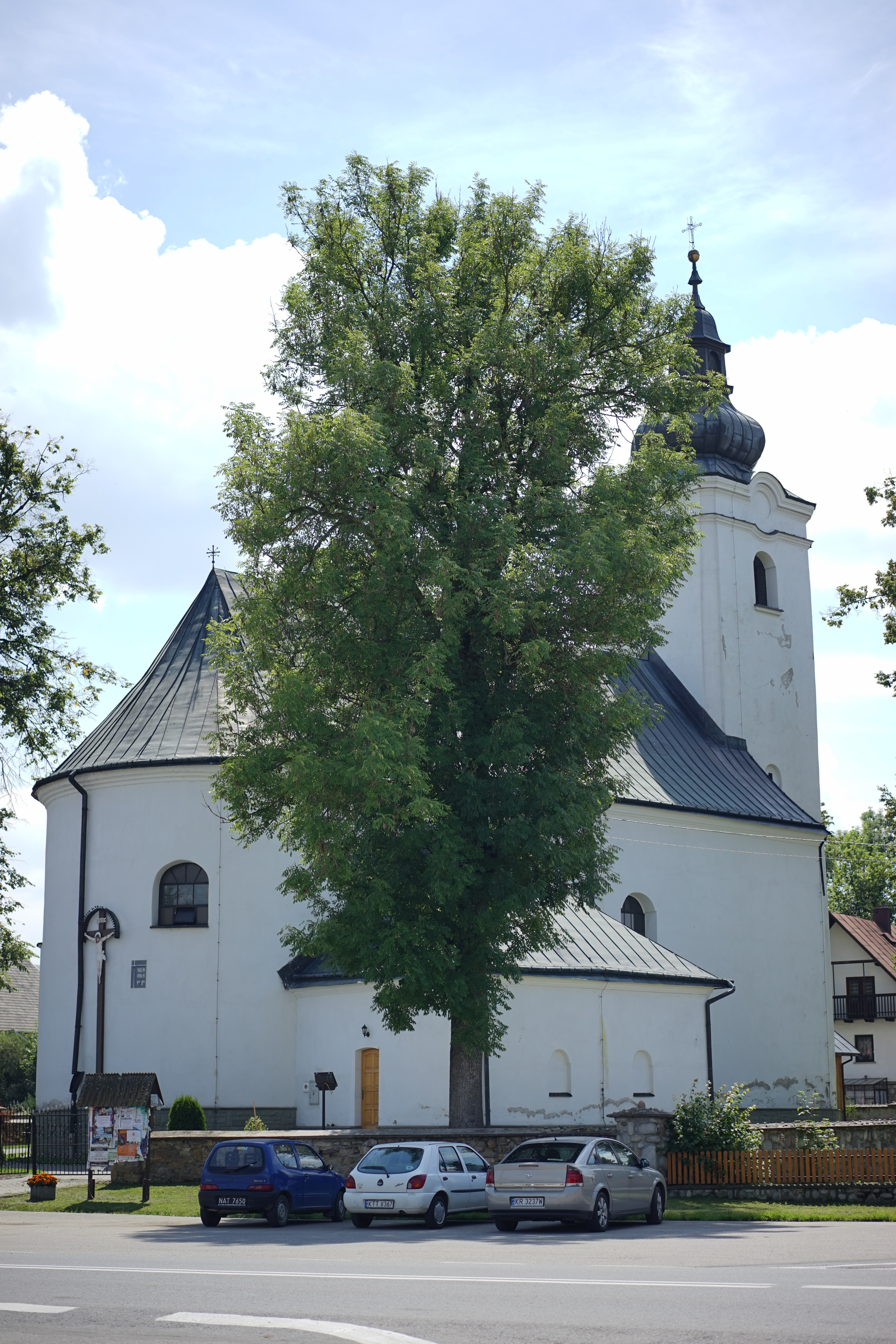
- St. Catherine church

- Location within Poland
- Coordinates: 49°27′N 20°9′E
- Country: Poland
- Voivodeship: Malopolska
- County: Nowy Targ
- Gmina: Nowy Targ
- Highest elevation: 620 m (2,030 ft)
- Lowest elevation: 600 m (2,000 ft)
- Population: 1,300
- Website: www.nowabiala.com

Nowa Biała [ˈnɔva ˈbjawa] (Slovak: Nová Belá) is a village in the administrative district of Gmina Nowy Targ, within Nowy Targ County, Lesser Poland Voivodeship, in southern Poland.

The village is in Central European Time, or UTC +1.

It is one of the 14 villages in the Polish part of the historical region of Spiš (Polish: Spisz) and the only one of them lying on the left bank of the Białka river, owing to past translocation of the stream.

The Obłazowa Cave, a highly significant Paleolithic archaeological site, is located nearby.
