= Maniowy =

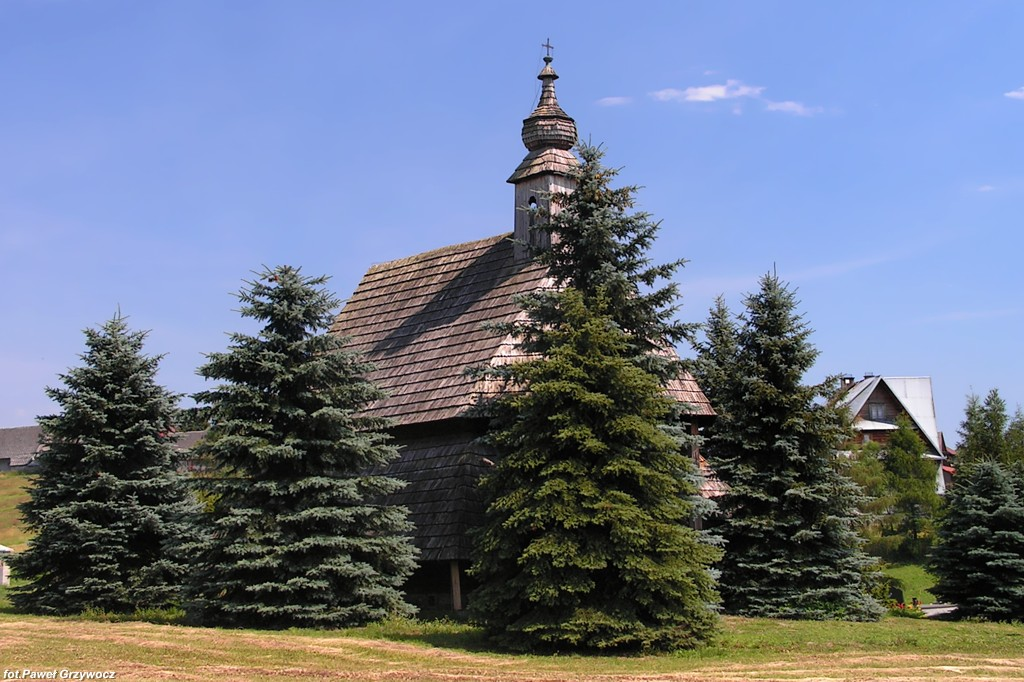
- The old wooden church, now in Maniowy cemetery

- Location within Poland
- Coordinates: 49°27′35″N 20°16′9″E
- Country: Poland
- Voivodeship: Lesser Poland
- County: Nowy Targ
- Gmina: Czorsztyn

Population
  - Total: 2,380
- Time zone: UTC+1 (CET)
  - Summer (DST): UTC+2 (CEST)
- Postal code: 34-436
- Area code: +48 18
- Car plates: KNT

Maniowy [maˈɲɔvɨ] is a village in southern Poland situated in the Lesser Poland Voivodeship about 19 kilometres (12 mi) east of Nowy Targ and 71 km (44 mi) south of the regional capital Kraków. It has been the seat of the district of Gmina Czorsztyn since 1993.

Located on the southern slopes of the Gorce Mountains, new Maniowy was built in 1970-1980s after having been moved to a higher altitude, from an area upon which Lake Czorsztyn now stretches. The history of the old village reached back to at least 1326 when it was founded during the colonisation of the Podhale region. The present village has a modern architecture of houses with several large buildings (for example Saint Nicholas Church and the gym hall) and is inhabited by over 2000 people. Neighbouring forests, mountains, lake, ski lifts and national parks are tourist attractions in each season of the year. On cloudless days a view of nearby Eastern Tatra Mountains can be seen from the village.

== Village displacement ==
Because of regular flooding of the region (including the flooding of 1934), plans had been drawn up for a dam in the region since 1905, and in 1964, a resolution was passed to build the dam on the Dunajec river. This meant that eventually, the existing town of Maniowy would be underwater, so measures were taken to relocate the residents further up the slopes away from the water. Resettlement to the new Maniowy started as early as the 1970s, and the waters started to cover the old town in 1995.

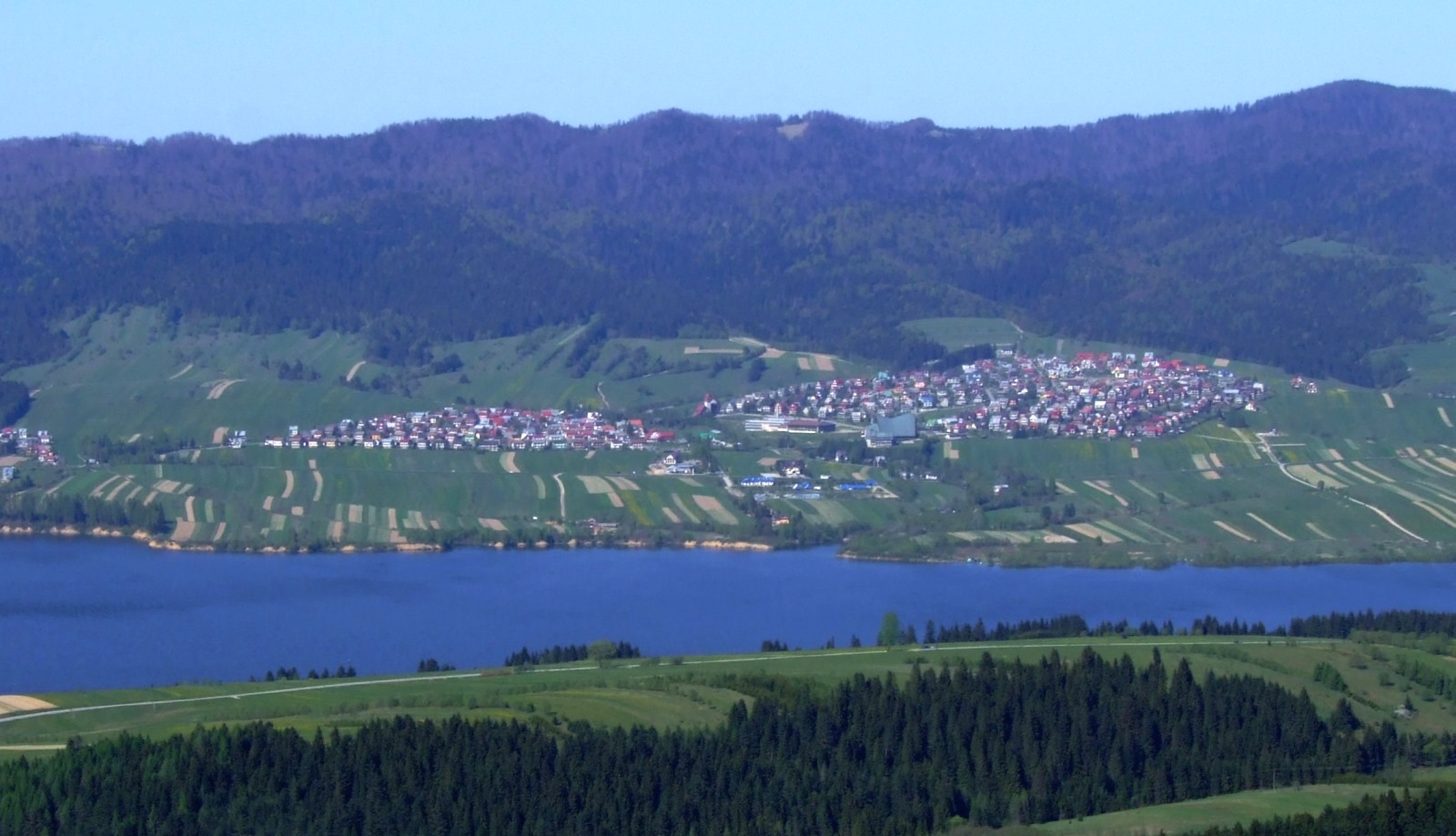
New Maniowy at higher elevation due to old village being covered by the lake

== See also ==
- Dunajec River
- Pieniny National Park (Poland)
- Nowy Targ
- Zakopane
