= Łapsze Wyżne =

- Village
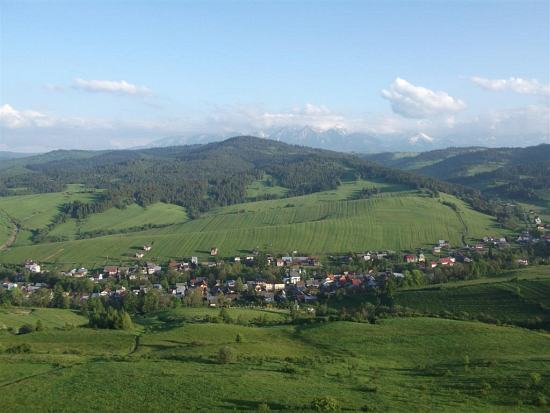
- Łapsze Wyżne

- Location within Poland
- Coordinates: 49°24′N 20°12′E
- Country: Poland
- Voivodeship: Lesser Poland
- County: Nowy Targ
- Gmina: Łapsze Niżne
- First mentioned: 1463
- Population: 800

Łapsze Wyżne [ˈwapʂɛ ˈvɨʐnɛ] (Slovak: Vyšné Lapše) is a village in the administrative district of Gmina Łapsze Niżne, within Nowy Targ County, Lesser Poland Voivodeship, in southern Poland, close to the border with Slovakia.

It is one of the 14 villages in the Polish part of the historical region of Spiš (Polish: Spisz). Łapsze Wyżne (where Wyżne means Upper, as it lays upper in the valley) is the younger village from the sister settlement Łapsze Niżne (where Niżne means Lower). It was first mentioned in 1463 and 1469.
