= Spiš =

Historical region in Slovakia and Poland

Coordinates: 49°5′N 20°30′E

Spiš Spiš, Spisz
- Historical region
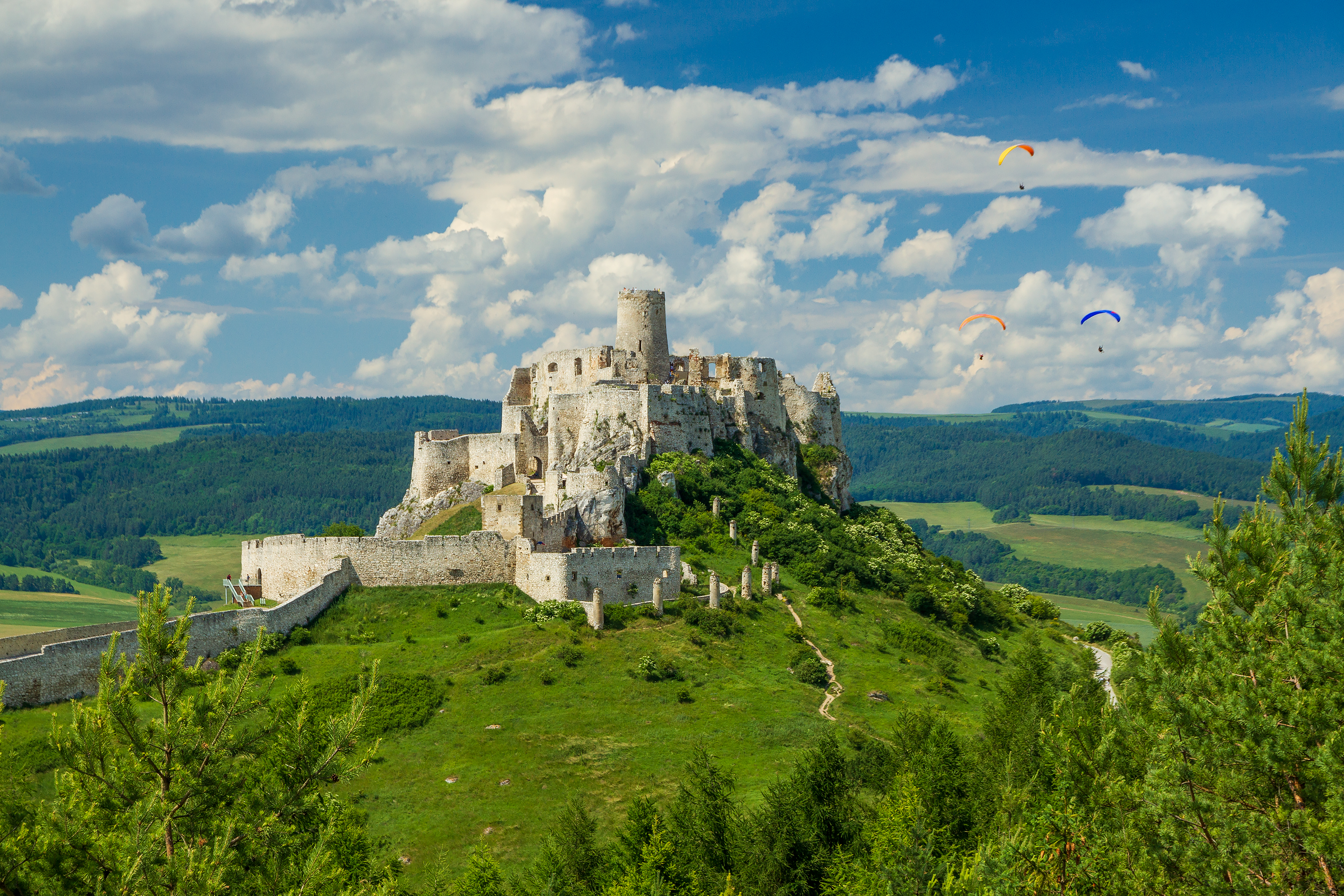
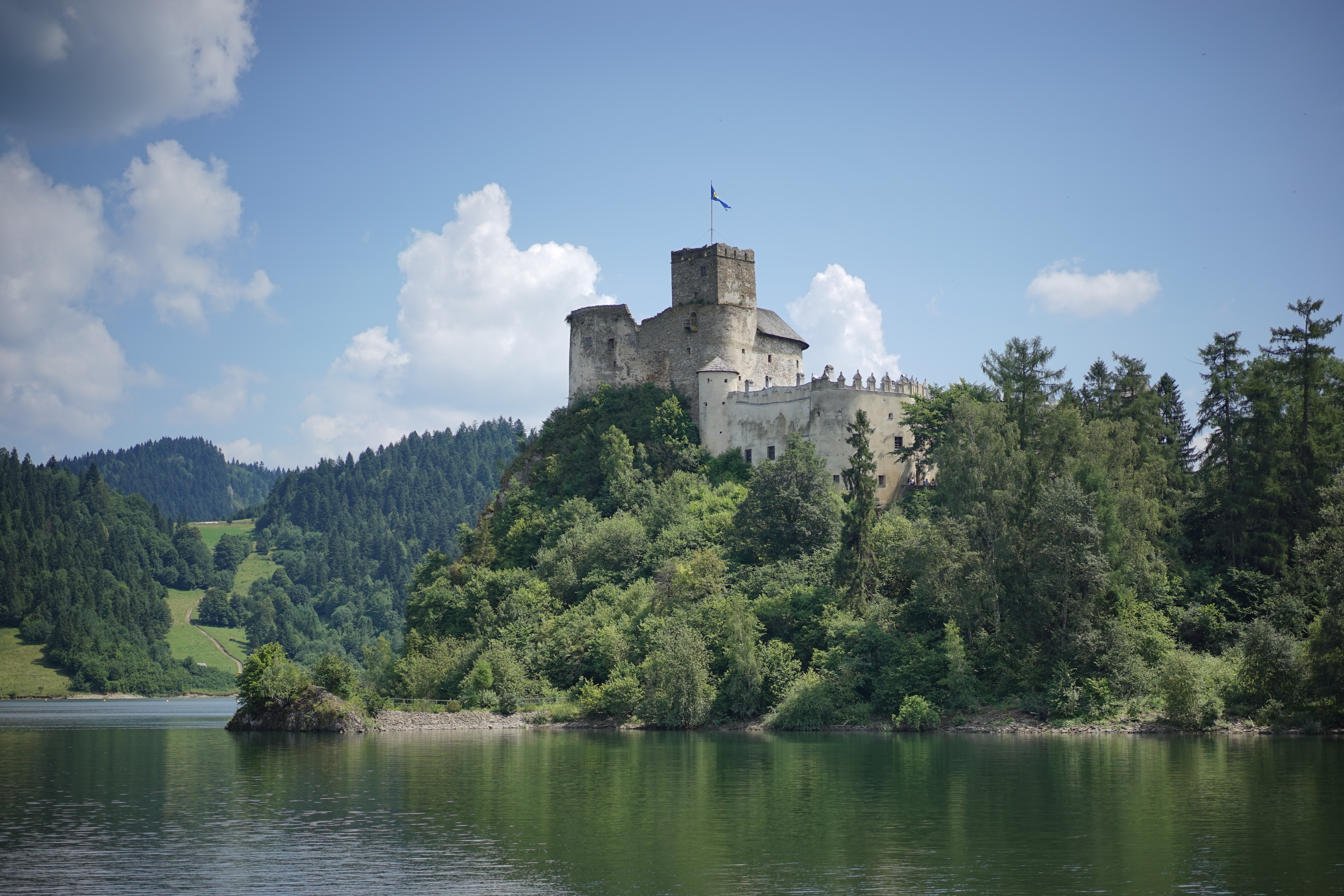
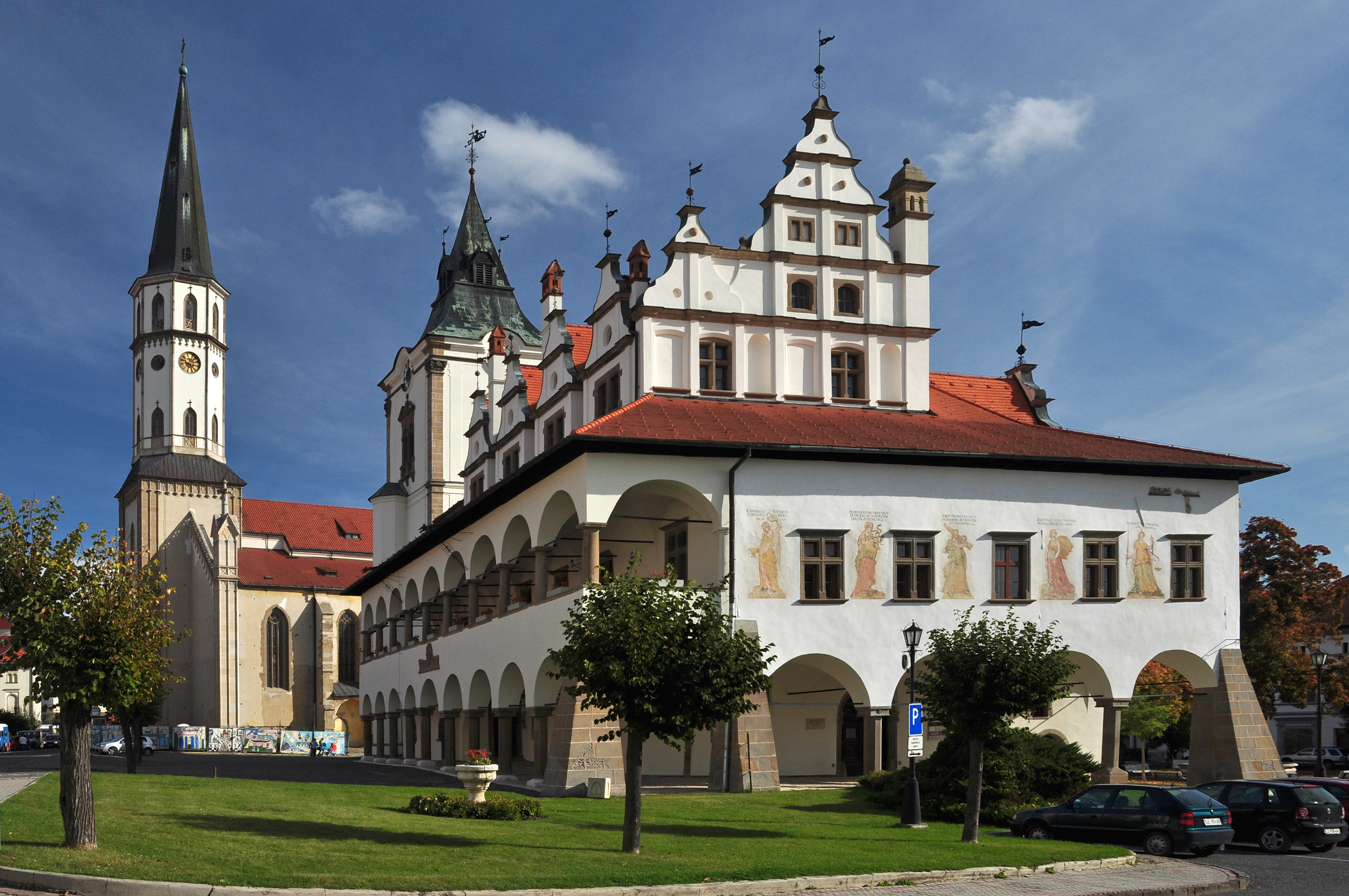
- Spiš Castle Niedzica Castle Town hall in Levoča Main square in Poprad

- Coat of arms

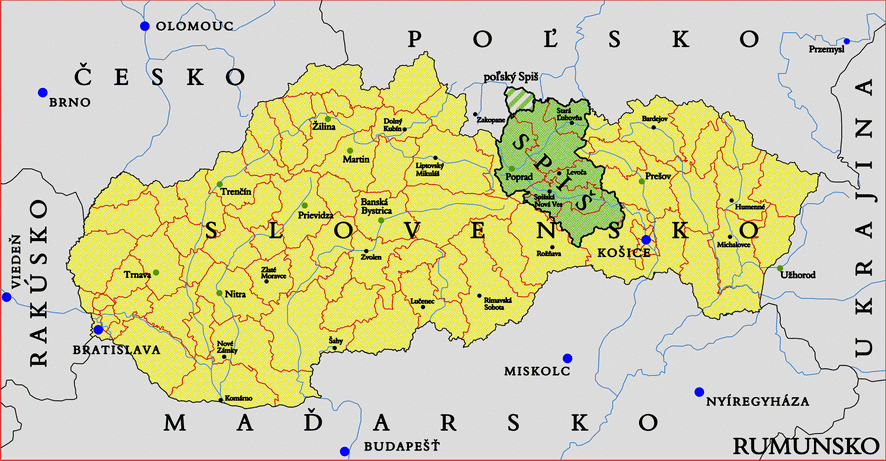
- Spiš on the map of Slovakia
- Country: Slovakia; Poland
- Largest city: Poprad
- Time zone: UTC+1 (CET)
  - Summer (DST): UTC+2 (CEST)

Spiš (Polish: Spisz [ˈspiʂ]; Hungarian: Szepesség or Szepes; German: Zips [tsɪps]) (Note: Latinized as Cips, Zepus, Scepus, Scepusia or Scepusium.) is a region in north-eastern Slovakia, with a very small area in south-eastern Poland (more specifically encompassing 14 villages). (Note: Czarna Góra, Dursztyn, Falsztyn, Frydman, Jurgów, Kacwin, Krempachy, Łapszanka, Łapsze Niżne, Łapsze Wyżne, Niedzica, Nowa Biała, Rzepiska and Trybsz.) Spiš is an informal designation of the territory, but it is also the name of one of the 21 official tourism regions of Slovakia. The region is not an administrative division in its own right, but between the late 11th century and 1918 it was an administrative county of the Kingdom of Hungary (see separate article Szepes County in this regard), with the exception of the former Spisz County of Poland from 1412–1772.

== Etymology ==
The name is probably related to the appellative spiška, špiška known from Slovak (Eastern Slovakia and Orava) and Moravian dialects (Haná) - a (cut) stick, a piece of wood or sugar, etc. Old Slavic pьchjati, pichjati - to stab, to cut → prefixed form sъ-pich-jь → after palatalization and extinction of yers spiš. Spiš probably means "a cut forest". The theory is supported also by the fact that almost all early Latin documents mention Spiš as silva Zepus (or with similar transcription) - the name of forest area.

Another theory is a derivation from Hungarian szép – nice, beautiful → Szepes. However, according to Šimon Ondruš this etymology is linguistically impossible because of phonetic reasons.

== Geography ==
The region is situated between the High Tatras and the Dunajec River in the north, the springs of the Váh River in the west, the Slovenské rudohorie Mountains (Slovak Ore Mountains) and Hnilec River in the south, and a line running from the town of Stará Ľubovňa, via the Branisko mountain (under which lies the 4,822 m long Branisko Tunnel, currently the longest in Slovakia), to the village of Margecany in the east. The core of the Spiš region is formed by the basins of the rivers Hornád and Poprad, and the High Tatra Mountains. Throughout its history, the territory has been characterized by a large percentage of forests - in the late 19th century, as much as 42.2% of Spiš was forest.

== History ==
=== Early history ===
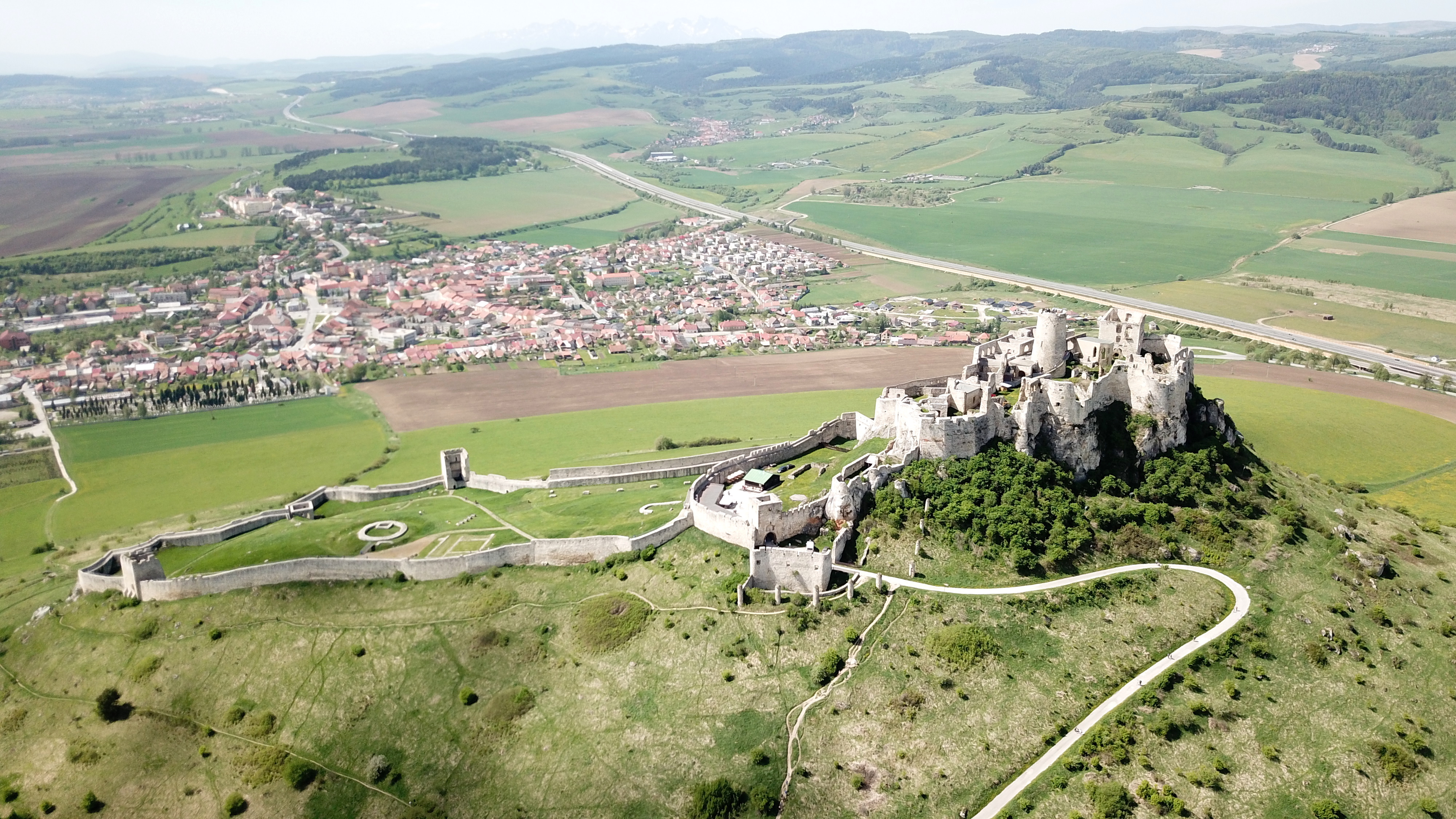
Aerial photograph of Spiš Castle

The history of the region until 1920 is given in more detail at Szepes County.

Traces of settlement in the Neanderthal era have been found in remains at Gánovce (Gánóc) and Bešeňová (Besenyőfalu).

The territory of Spiš was later populated first by Celts. It belonged to the state of Great Moravia (Veľká Morava), and after its dissolution became part of Poland.

The southern part of the territory was conquered by the Kingdom of Hungary at the end of the 11th century, when the border of the Kingdom ended near the modern town of Kežmarok. The royal county of Szepes (comitatus Scepusiensis) was created in the 2nd half of the 12th century. In the 1250s the border of the Kingdom of Hungary shifted to the north to Podolínec and in 1260 even further to the north (the Dunajec River). The northeastern region around Hniezdne and Stará Ľubovňa, the so-called "districtus Podoliensis", was incorporated only in the 1290s. The northern border of the county stabilized in the early 14th century. Around 1300, the royal county became a noble county.

Many of the towns of Spiš developed from German colonization. The German settlers had been invited to the territory from the mid-12th century onwards. The settlements founded by them in southern Spiš were mainly mining settlements (later towns). Consequently, until World War II Spiš had a large German population (called Zipsers; see Carpathian Germans) who spoke Zipser German; now, the only Zipser-speaking village is Chmeľnica (Hopgarten). Many smaller settlements were populated by settlers from Poland.

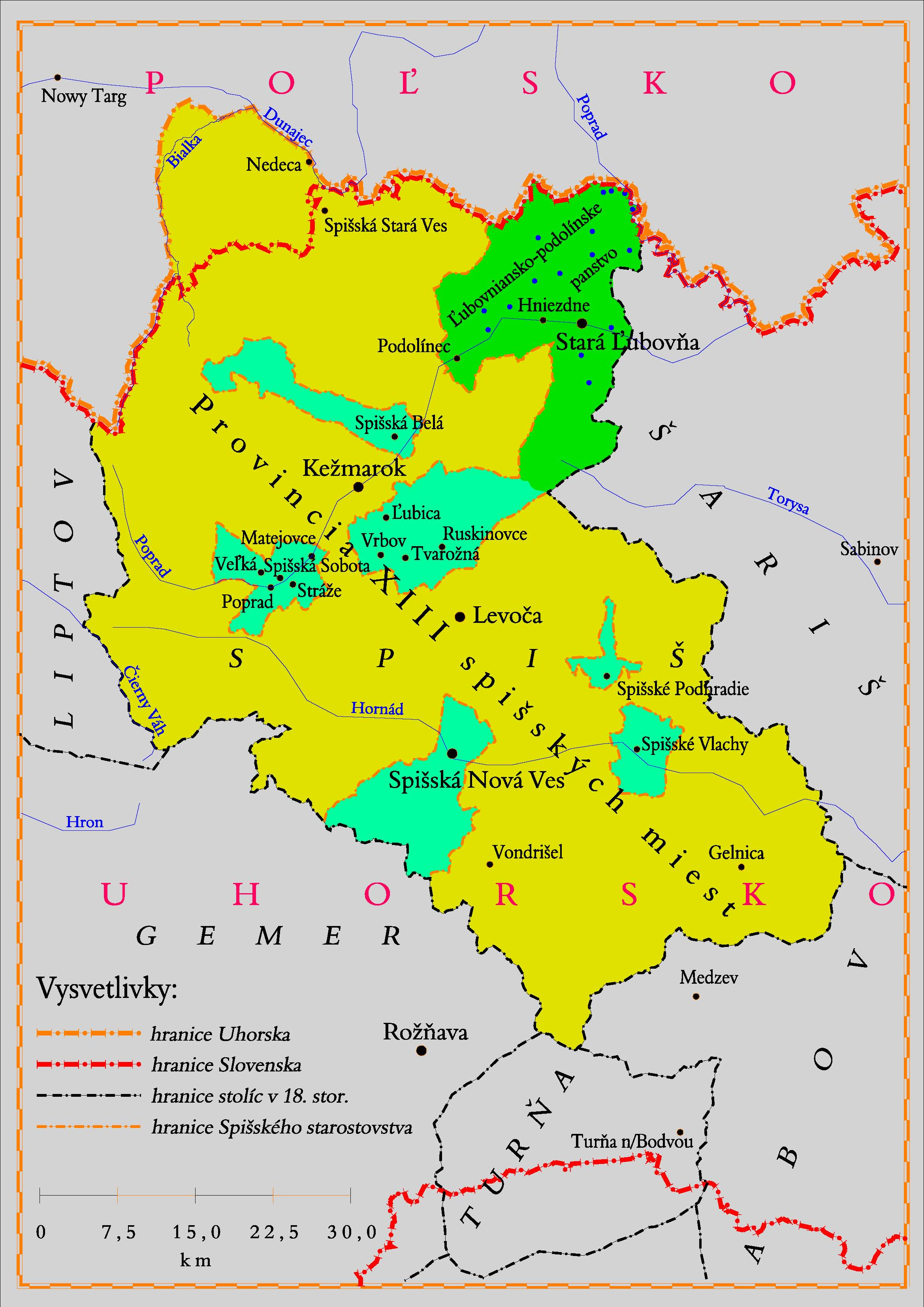
Map of Spiš in 1412–1772: Kingdom of Hungary Kingdom of Poland

In 1412, under the Treaty of Lubowla, 16 towns, two castles and a number of villages in Spiš were pawned to Poland by Sigismund of Luxembourg to finance his wars with the Republic of Venice in Dalmatia. Among the towns that for 360 years belonged to Poland were: Stará Ľubovňa, Podolínec, Spišská Sobota, Poprad and Spišská Nová Ves. The Ľubovňa Castle was the seat of the starosts of the Spisz County of Poland. During the Swedish invasion of Poland of 1655–1660, the Polish Crown Treasury was preserved at the castle. A resolution of the Sejm in 1658 designated the Ľubovňa Castle as one of the six most important fortresses of the Polish-Lithuanian Commonwealth, requiring that it be maintained and supplied, and its garrison was increased. Fighting took place in the region between the supporters of Stanisław Leszczyński and Augustus II the Strong during the Polish civil war of 1704–1706, part of the Great Northern War, with local starost Teodor Lubomirski supporting the former. The hostilities ended in 1709 with the defeat of Stanisław Leszczyński and the invasion of Spisz by Russian troops. Starost Teodor Lubomirski fled to Vienna, but was eventually allowed to return and reclaim his office. After his death, Queen of Poland Maria Josepha was appointed starost by King Augustus III of Poland, and the powerful Royal minister Henryk Bruhl administered the region on her behalf. The last starost of the Polish Spisz County was Kazimierz Poniatowski, brother of King Stanisław August Poniatowski. In 1769, the Polish Spisz County was invaded and occupied by the Habsburg monarchy, three years before the First Partition of Poland.

In 1868, 21 Spiš settlements sent their demands, the 'Spiš Petition', to the Diet of the Kingdom of Hungary, requesting special status for Slovaks within the Kingdom.

=== Spiš after the creation of Czechoslovakia ===
In 1918 (and confirmed by the Treaty of Trianon in 1920), the county became part of newly formed Czechoslovakia. A tiny part of the territory (situated in today's Poland below the Rysy), amounting to 195 km^{2} after an internal border dispute had been confirmed to be part of Galicia (Central Europe) (at that time the western part of Austria-Hungary) as early as 1902. After World War I northern Spiš was united with Poland and became the subject of a long-running border dispute between Poland and Czechoslovakia. In 1923 Slovak Spiš was divided between the newly formed Sub-Tatra county (Podtatranská župa) and Košice county (Коšická župa). In 1928-1939 and 1945-1948 it was part of the newly created Slovak Land (Slovenská krajina).

During World War II, when Czechoslovakia was divided, Spiš was part of independent Slovakia, and formed the eastern part of Tatra county (Tatranská župa) from 1940 to 1945. Slovakia joined the Axis, and the Polish part of Spiš (together with the Polish part of the county of Orava) was transferred to Slovakia. During the war all the Jews of the area were deported or murdered. When Soviet forces approached from the east at the end of 1944, most of the ethnic Germans in Spiš fled westward, between mid-November 1944 and 21 January 1945 (see also Carpathian Germans). Their property was confiscated after the war (see Beneš decrees).

After World War II the prewar borders of Spiš were restored, with most of the county going to Czechoslovakia, and a small part to Poland. In 1948, it became part of the newly created Košice Region (Košický kraj) and Prešov Region (Prešovský kraj), whose borders however were completely different from those of the present-day regions of the same name. From July 1960 it became part of the newly created Eastern Slovak region (Východoslovenský kraj), which ceased to exist in September 1990.

In 1993, Czechoslovakia was split and the bulk of Spiš became part of Slovakia.

== Nationalities ==
In the late 15th century, the larger part of Szepes County was inhabited by a German population, which was gradually replaced by Polish highlanders and Ruthenians in the north and Slovaks in the south. The non-Slovak Slavic inhabitants experienced Slovakization, which, in the case of Polish highlanders, primarily resulted from the strong influence of the Slovak Roman Catholic Church. The assimilation into Slovak identity was particularly effective in the 19th century, during which non-Slovak villages shifted their national orientation to become predominantly Slovak. The local Polish minority was not recorded in Hungarian censuses after the mid-19th century, and the population in areas traditionally inhabited by Polish highlanders was classified as Tót (Slovak or Slav).

According to censuses carried out in the Kingdom of Hungary in 1869 (and later in 1900 and 1910) the population of Szepes county comprised the following nationalities: Slovaks 50.4%, (58.2%, 58%), Germans 35% (25%, 25%), Carpatho-Rusyns 13.8% (8.4%, 8%) and 0.7% (6%, 6%) Hungarians. Official data from 1880 show the following ethnic composition: Slovaks 55.4%, Germans 28.3%, Rusyns 9.3%, Hungarians 2.0%, and Romani 0.8%, while Poles, officially counted as Slovaks, were estimated to constitute between 15.5% and 21.3% of the population (Slovaks, therefore, between 34.1% and 39.8%).

The current ethnic composition of the region, however, is much different. As mentioned above, many Jews and ethnic Germans were removed or left during World War II.

Present-day Spiš has a number of Romani settlements and Romani are a substantial minority there.

There are also 40,000-48,000 Gorals (Slovak: Gorali; literally Highlanders). Although a negligible number in census terms, they are a distinctive minority with their own culture, and speak a dialect of Polish (or Slovak-Polish dialect continuum by some considered a language), especially elders. They consider themselves as Slovaks and, in present, speak mostly Slovak language. Official Slovak 2011's census reported only 3084 Poles living in Slovakia.

== Religion ==
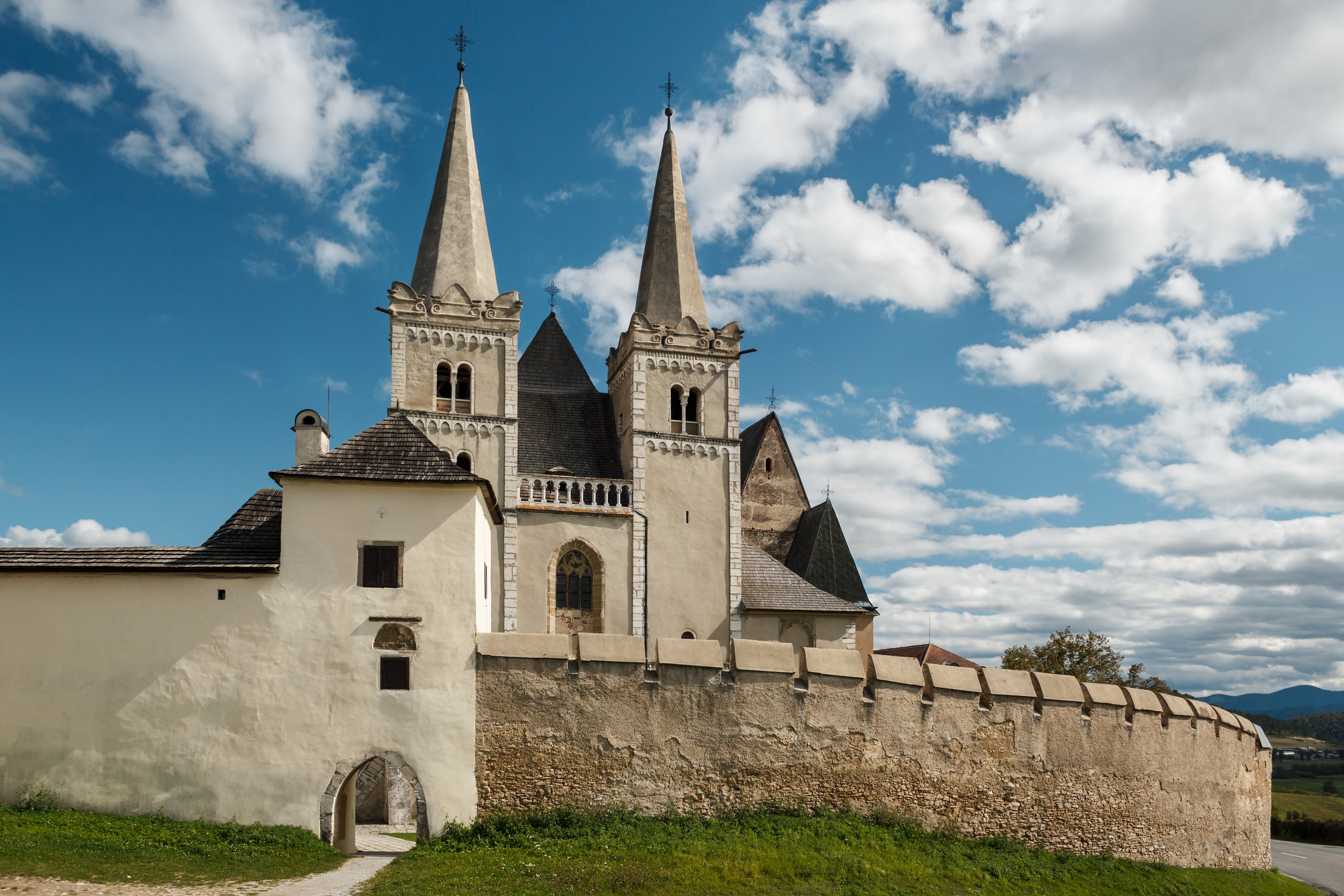
Cathedral of St. Martin in Spišská Kapitula, the seat of the Roman Catholic Diocese of Spiš, covering a large part of Spiš, and a UNESCO World Heritage Site

In Spiš are the biggest and oldest churches such as a Roman Catholic Church and Evangelical Church of Augsburg Confession (Lutherans). In the year 1600 the biggest church was the Evangelical Church. Currently, the biggest church is the Roman Catholic Church. According to data from 1880, the religious make-up of the region was as follows: Roman Catholics 64.1%, Lutherans 19.2%, Greek Catholics 12.9%, Jews 3.4%, and Calvinists 0.2%.

== Economy ==
Historically, economic activity in the region has been based principally on agriculture and forestry (formerly mining, too), which explains why Spiš belongs to the relatively poor regions of Slovakia. Since the late 19th century, tourism has helped the local economy, and sanatoria and winter sports resorts have been built in the High Tatras and the Low Tatras, and areas such as the Slovak Paradise (Slovenský raj) in the south-west and the Pieniny National Park at the Slovak-Polish border. Other tourist destinations include the region's historical sites like Spiš Castle and nearby Spišské Podhradie, Spišská Kapitula, Žehra and the town of Levoča (all of which are listed by UNESCO as World Heritage Sites), Kežmarok, and Stará Ľubovňa Castle. The tourism industry has developed rapidly in Spiš, aided by the introduction of regular flights to Tatry Airport and improving rail and road connections.

== Spiš today ==
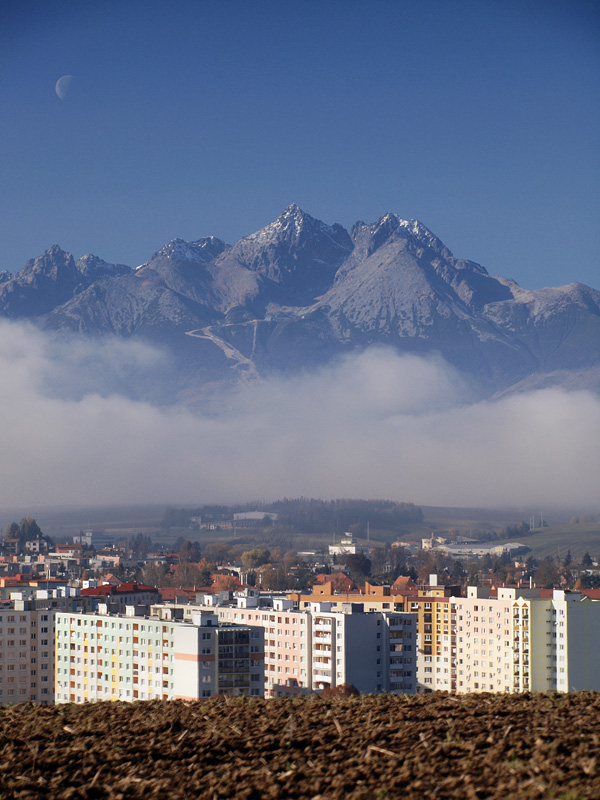
The High Tatra Mountains From Kežmarok

Spiš today is one of Slovakia's 21 tourist regions but, unlike its predecessor, is not an administrative region.

Since 1996, Spiš has been divided between the modern Košice Region and Prešov Region and is covered approximately by the following six administrative districts: Poprad, Kežmarok, Stará Ľubovňa, Spišská Nová Ves, Levoča and Gelnica, except for the eastern half of the Stará Ľubovňa District that had been within Saris county and three villages of the Poprad district (Štrba including Tatranská Štrba, Štrbské Pleso and Liptovská Teplička from Liptov county.)

The present population of the Spiš region is about 320,000; almost half the population lives in towns, the largest of which are Poprad (55,000), Spišská Nová Ves (39,000) and Kežmarok (17,000).

== Sources ==
- Krempaská, Zuzana, Sixteen Scepus Towns from 1412 to 1876, Spišska Nova Vés: Spiš Museum. ISBN 9788085173062
