= Huba, Lesser Poland Voivodeship =

Huba
- Village
- Location within Poland
- Coordinates: 49°29′N 20°14′E
- Country: Poland
- Voivodeship: Lesser Poland
- County: Nowy Targ
- Gmina: Czorsztyn

Huba [ˈxuba] is a village in the administrative district of Gmina Czorsztyn, within Nowy Targ County, Lesser Poland Voivodeship, in southern Poland, close to the border with Slovakia.

The village of Huba, Poland is one of the smallest Podhalanian villages. Her history dates back to the 17th century, with over 400 years of history and sixteen generations of residents. In 1869 the village was made up of 22 houses and 146 residence and by 1952 there were 30 houses.

To read more about Huba, read Andrzej Niemiec. "The History of Huba". Publisher Janina Machon-Bartula
