= Trybsz =

- Village
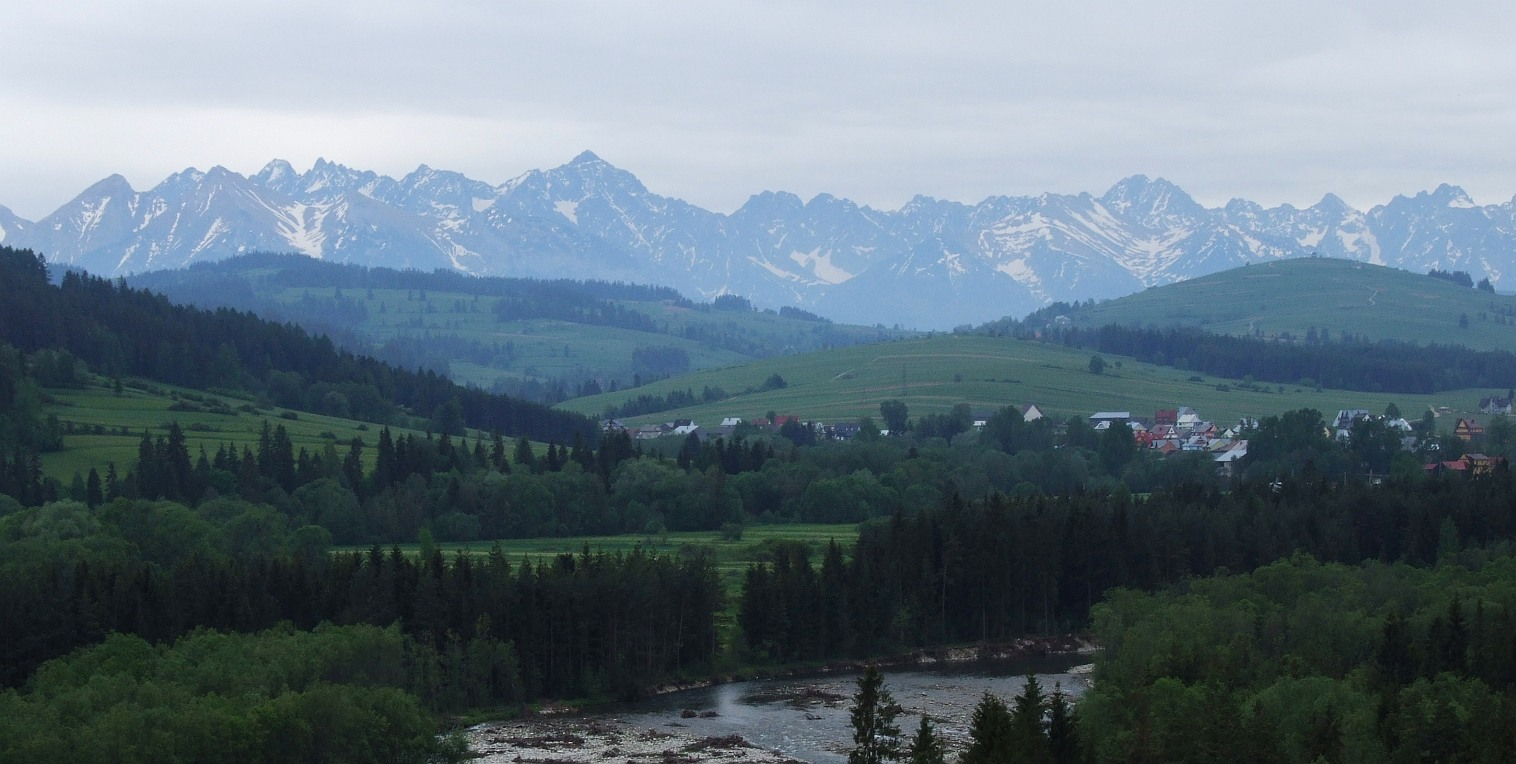
- Trybsz, Tatras in the background

- Location within Poland
- Coordinates: 49°25′N 20°9′E
- Country: Poland
- Voivodeship: Lesser Poland
- County: Nowy Targ
- Gmina: Łapsze Niżne
- Population: 800

Trybsz [trɨpʂ] (Slovak: Tribš) is a village in the administrative district of Gmina Łapsze Niżne, within Nowy Targ County, Lesser Poland Voivodeship, in southern Poland, close to the border with Slovakia.

It is one of the 14 villages in the Polish part of the historical region of Spiš (Polish: Spisz). Beginning in the 16th century it was being mentioned in documents as Trepsia or Trepschya.

The biggest landmark in the village is a wooden church from the 16th century. Dedicated to St. Elisabeth of Hungary, inside polychromes represent the Catholic saints and scenes from the Bible. Dating back to 1647, they were laid out by the parish priest Jan Ratulowski of Frydman, but their author remains unknown.

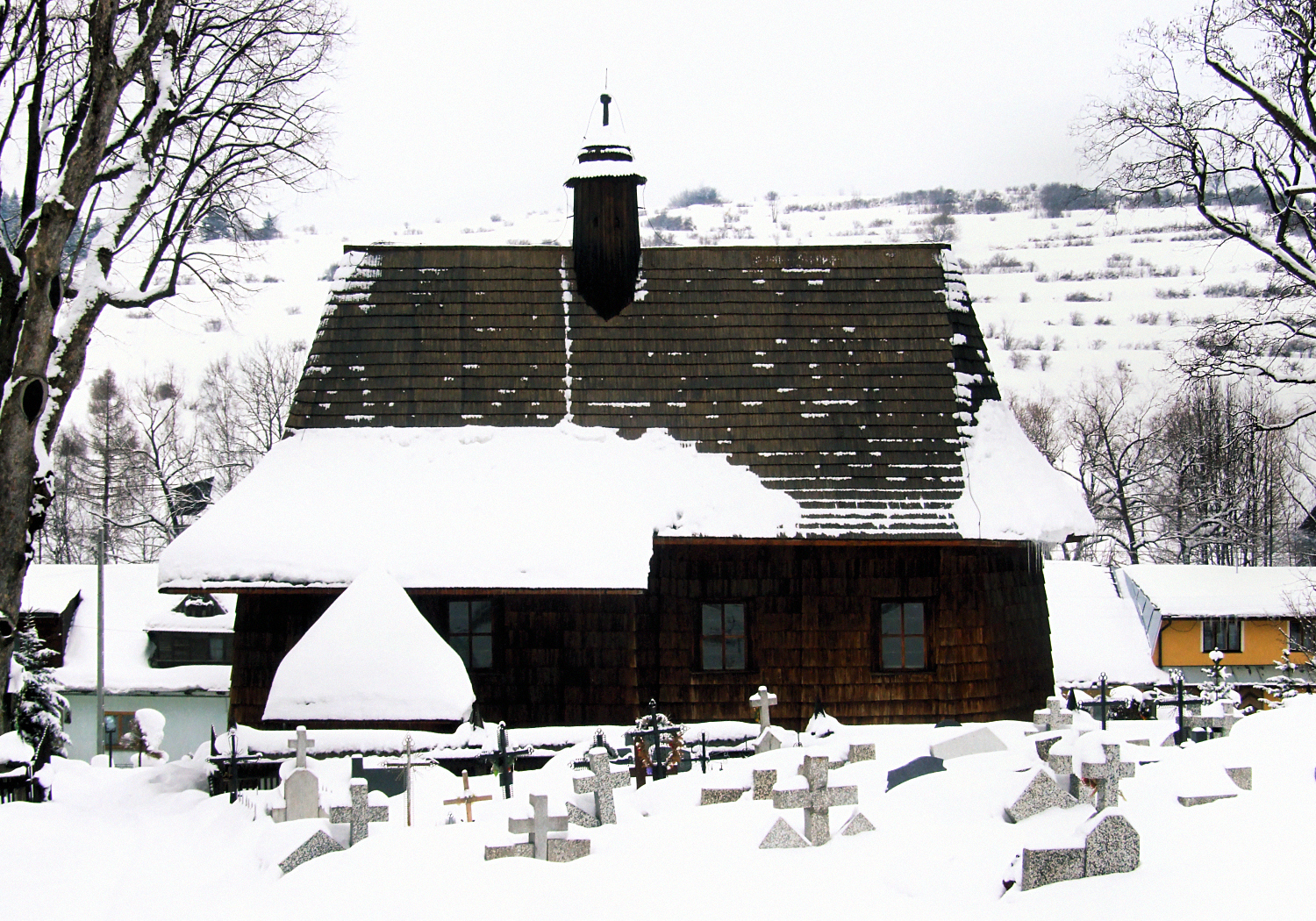
St. Elisabeth of Hungary church
