= Gmina Łapsze Niżne =

Gmina Łapsze Niżne Łapsze Niżne Commune
- Gmina
- Coat of arms
- Interactive map of Gmina Łapsze Niżne
- Coordinates (Łapsze Niżne): 49°24′N 20°15′E
- Country: Poland
- Voivodeship: Lesser Poland
- County: Nowy Targ
- Seat: Łapsze Niżne

Area
  - Total: 124.79 km^{2} (48.18 sq mi)

Population (2006)
  - Total: 8,785
  - Density: 70.40/km^{2} (182.3/sq mi)
- Website: http://www.lapszenizne.pl

Gmina Łapsze Niżne is a rural gmina (administrative district) in Nowy Targ County, Lesser Poland Voivodeship, in southern Poland, on the Slovak border. Its seat is the village of Łapsze Niżne, which lies approximately 19 kilometres (12 mi) south-east of Nowy Targ and 77 km (48 mi) south of the regional capital Kraków.

The gmina covers an area of 124.79 square kilometres (48.2 sq mi), and as of 2006 its total population is 8,785.

== Villages ==
Gmina Łapsze Niżne contains the villages and settlements of Falsztyn, Frydman, Kacwin, Łapszanka, Łapsze Niżne, Łapsze Wyżne, Niedzica and Trybsz.

== Neighbouring gminas ==
Gmina Łapsze Niżne is bordered by the gminas of Bukowina Tatrzańska, Czorsztyn and Nowy Targ. It also borders Slovakia.
