= Frydman =

- Village
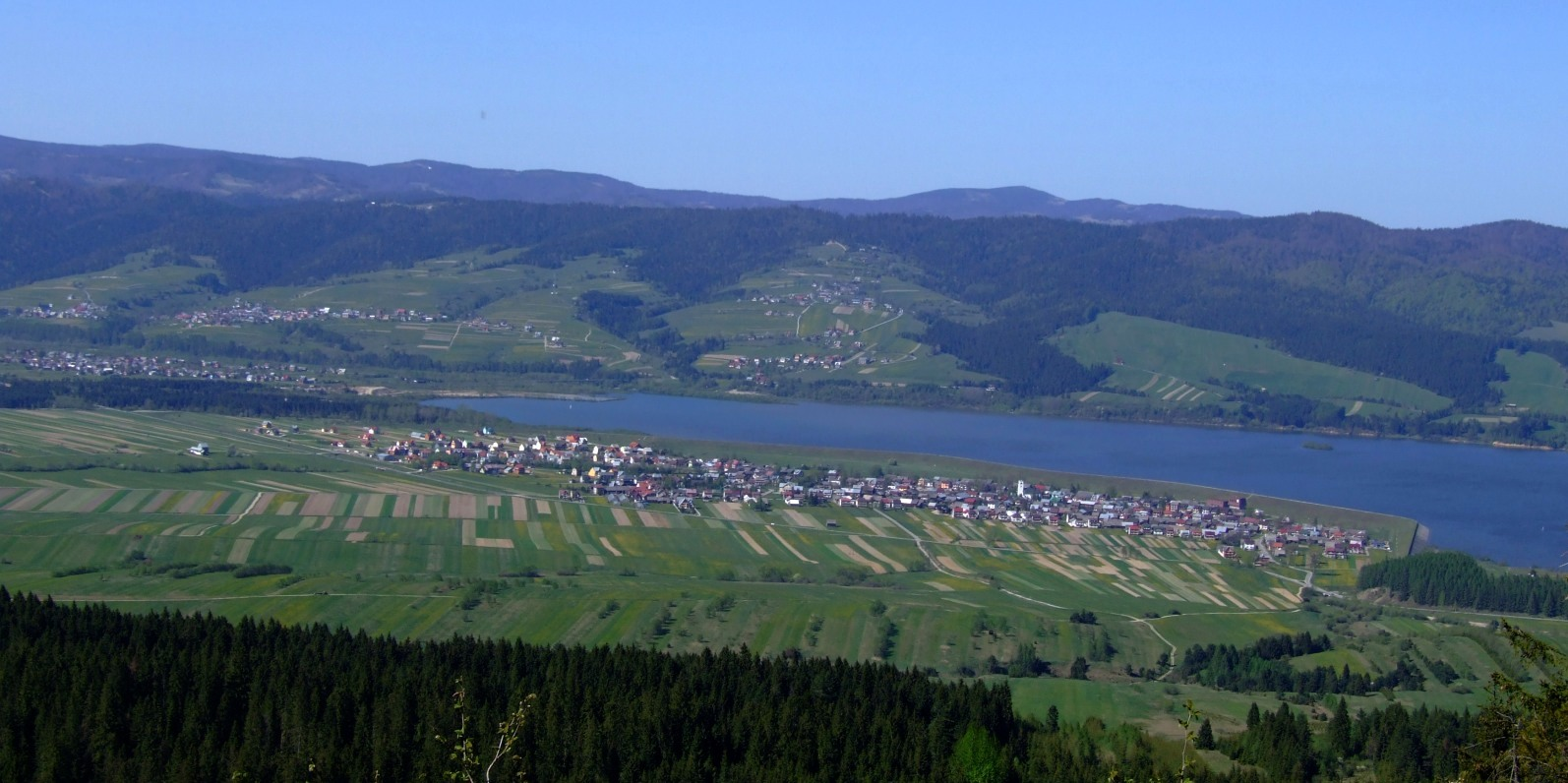
- Frydman

- Location within Poland
- Coordinates: 49°28′N 20°14′E
- Country: Poland
- Voivodeship: Lesser Poland
- County: Nowy Targ
- Gmina: Łapsze Niżne
- First mentioned: 1320
- Population: 1,600

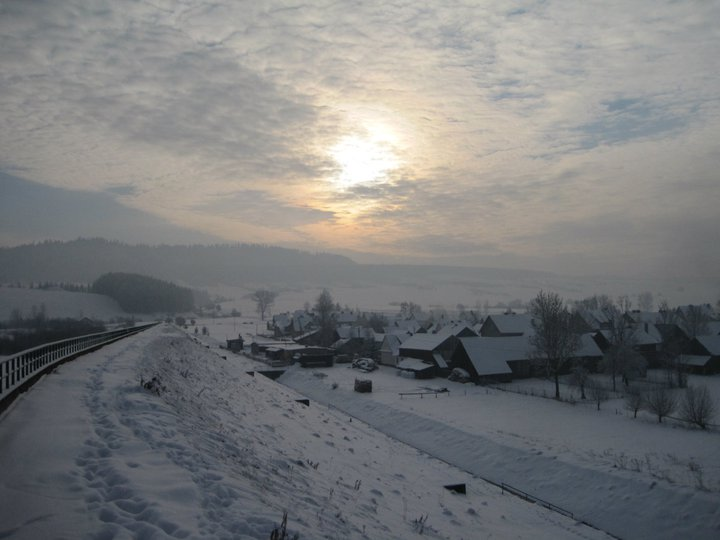
A view from Frydman during Winter

Frydman [ˈfrɨdman] (Slovak: Fridman, Hungarian: Frigyesvágása) is a village in the administrative district of Gmina Łapsze Niżne, within Nowy Targ County, Lesser Poland Voivodeship, in southern Poland, close to the border with Slovakia.

It is one of the 14 villages in the Polish part of the historical region of Spiš (Polish: Spisz). It was first mentioned in a written document in 1320 (terram Fridmanvagasa).
