= Krempachy =

- Village
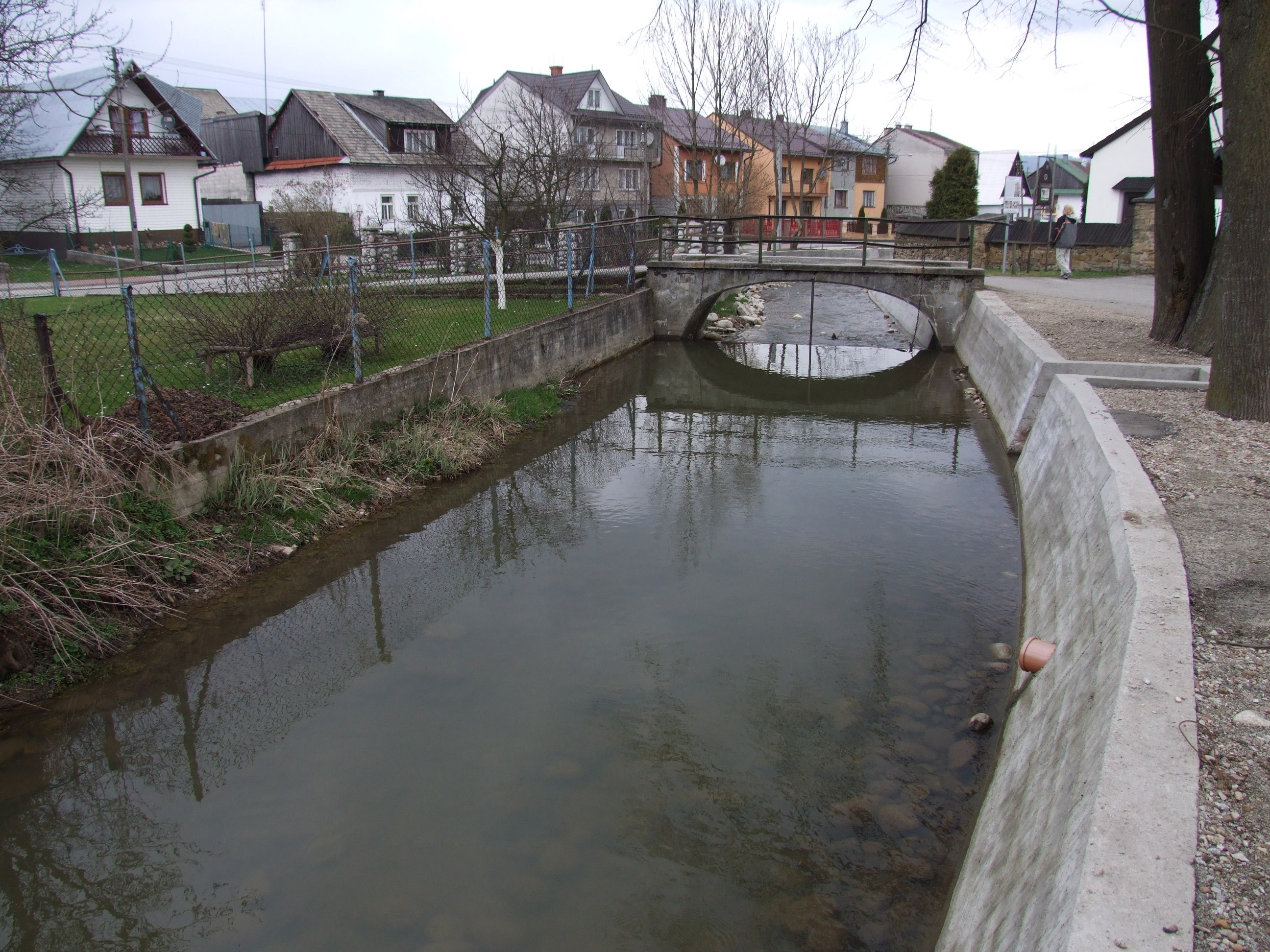
- Dursztyński Potok running through Krempachy village

- Location within Poland
- Coordinates: 49°26′N 20°9′E
- Country: Poland
- Voivodeship: Lesser Poland
- County: Nowy Targ
- Gmina: Nowy Targ
- First mentioned: 1439
- Elevation: 600 m (2,000 ft)
- Population: 1,200
- Website: http://www.krempachy.ugnowytarg.pl/

Krempachy [krɛmˈpaxɨ] is a village in the administrative district of Gmina Nowy Targ, within Nowy Targ County, Lesser Poland Voivodeship, in southern Poland.

It is one of the 14 villages in the Polish part of the historical region of Spiš (Polish: Spisz). It was probably established in the 14th century but was first mentioned in a written document in 1439.

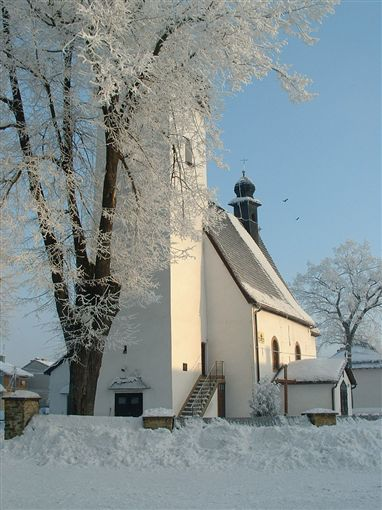
Saint Martin Church
