= Stanisławów Ghetto =

Nazi ghetto in occupied Ukraine

Coordinates: 48°55′22″N 24°42′38″E

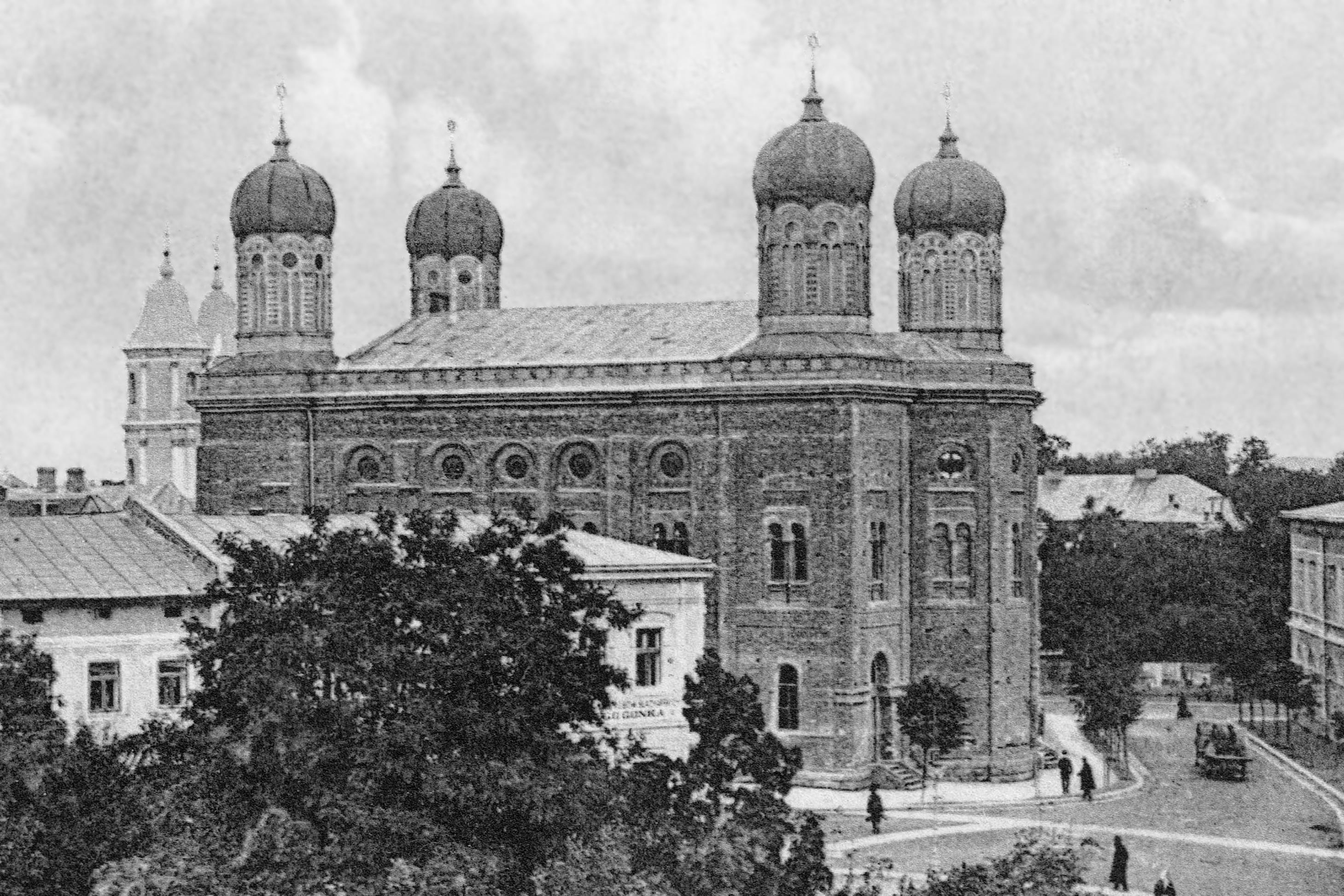
- Tempel Synagogue in Stanislavov before World War II

- Stanisławów location during the Holocaust in Eastern Europe
- Location: Stanisławów German occupied Poland today Ivano-Frankivsk, Western Ukraine
- Incident type: Imprisonment, slave labor, mass killing
- Organizations: SS
- Camp: Belzec (see map)
- Victims: 20,000 Jews and 10,000–12,000 before the Ghetto was set up, in Bloody Sunday massacre

Stanisławów Ghetto (Polish: getto w Stanisławowie, German: Ghetto Stanislau) was a ghetto established in 1941 by Nazi Germany in Stanisławów (now Ivano-Frankivsk) in German occupied Poland (today Ukraine). After the German invasion of the Soviet Union, the town was incorporated into District of Galicia, as the fifth district of the General Government.

On 12 October 1941, during the so-called Bloody Sunday, some 10,000–12,000 Jews were shot into mass graves at the Jewish cemetery by the German uniformed SS-men from SIPO and Order Police battalions assisted by the Ukrainian Auxiliary Police. Dr. Tenenbaum of the Judenrat refused the offer of exemption and was killed along with the others. Two months after that, the ghetto was established officially for the 20,000 Jews still remaining, and sealed off with walls on 20 December 1941. Over a year later, in February 1943, the Ghetto was officially closed, when no more Jews were held in it.

== Historical background ==
The Polish Stanisławów County had 198,400 residents in 1931 according to the Polish census. Among them were 120,214 Orthodox Christians (Ukrainian, Ruthenian and Russian), 49,032 Catholics, and 26,996 Jews. The population of the capital grew rapidly from 28,200 in 1921 to 60,000 in 1931 (or 70,000 together with the suburbs incorporated into the city by the 1924 decision of Rada Ministrów).

During the 1939 invasion of Poland by Nazi Germany and the Soviet Union, the province was captured by the Red Army in September 1939. The Soviet NKVD crimes committed against the local population included the last minute massacre of 2,500 political prisoners in the city, Ukrainian, Polish, and Jewish alike, just before the Nazi occupation of Stanislavov. Women with dozens of children were shot by the Soviets at the secluded Dem'ianiv Laz ravine outside the city, among at least 524 victims forced to dig their own mass grave.

== Nazi atrocities ==
There were more than 50,000 Jews in Stanisławów and surrounding countryside when it was occupied by the Hungarian army on 2 July 1941. The Germans arrived on 26 July. On the same day, the Gestapo detachment ordered a Judenrat established in the city. It was headed by Israel Seibald. On 1 August 1941, Galicia became the fifth district of the General Government. A day later, Poles and Jews of the intelligentsia were ordered to report to the police under the guise of "registering" for placement. Of the eight hundred men who came, six hundred were transported by SIPO to the forest called Czarny Las, near Pawełcze village (Pawelce), and murdered in secrecy. Families (80% Jewish) were not informed, and continued sending parcels for them.

The command of Stanisławów was taken over by an SS commander, Hans Krueger, who set up a branch office of the KdS in the city.^{[a]} One month earlier, Krüger was involved in organizing the massacre of Lviv professors in occupied Lviv. Under his command, on 8–9 August 1941 more Poles and Jews in Stanisławów were arrested, including teachers, civil servants and professors. They were summoned according to a list, compiled by the Ukrainian People's Militia who were helping the German Security Police (officially, the collaborationist Ukrainian Auxiliary Police was created in mid-August by Heinrich Himmler). On 15 August, the prisoners were transported in covered lorries to a place near the city, named the Black Forest (Czarny Las) and executed. The number of victims is estimated at 200–300.

=== Bloody Sunday massacre ===
City commandant Hans Krueger, Gestapo

On 12 October 1941 at the orders of Hans Krueger thousands of Jews gathered at the Ringplatz market square for a "selection". The Nazi forces (augmented by the Order Police battalion 133 brought in from Lemberg, and the Ukrainian police) escorted them to the Jewish cemetery, where the mass graves had already been prepared. On the way, the Ukrainian and German guards beat and tortured the prisoners. At the cemetery the Jews were forced to give away their valuables, and show their papers. Some were released. The shooters ordered the Jews gathered in groups to strip naked and then proceed to the graves. The men of the Sicherheitspolizei (SiPo) were the first to open fire, augmented by members of the Nürnberg Order Police, and the Bahnschutz railroad police. The victims either fell into the graves or were ordered to jump in before being killed. Between 10,000 and 12,000 Jews were murdered: men, women and children. The shooters started firing at 12 noon and continued without stopping by taking turns. There were picnic tables set up on the side with bottles of vodka and sandwiches for those of them who needed to rest from the deafening noise of gunfire; separate for Germans and Ukrainians. They tried to continue after dark with floodlights but finally gave up; and the remaining captives were released. The Aktion, unprecedented in terms of scale in Holocaust history until that date in occupied Poland, was known as the Blutsonntag (Bloody Sunday). There was a victory celebration held that night at the headquarters.

The Bloody Sunday massacre of 12 October 1941 was the single largest massacre of Polish Jews perpetrated by the uniformed police in the General Government prior to genocidal Aktion Reinhardt of 1942. It was preceded by the Red Friday massacre of 5,000 Jews in the Białystok Ghetto on 27–28 June 1941 by the Police Battalion 309, but surpassed only by the Police Battalion 45 massacre of 33,000 Jews at Babi Yar in Reichskommissariat Ukraine outside Kiev on 29–30 September 1941; and the final Aktion Erntefest massacre of more than 43,000 Jews at the Majdanek concentration camp and its subcamps on 3 November 1943 perpetrated by the Trawniki men from Ukraine along with the Reserve Police Battalion 101 of the German Order Police from Hamburg.

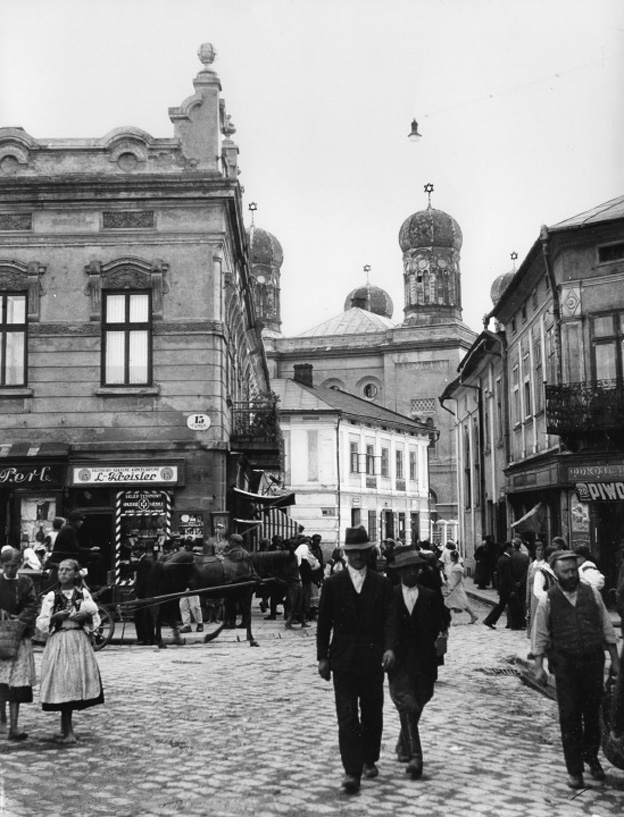
Jewish neighbourhood before World War II with store signs in Polish and the Reform Tempel Synagogue in the background

=== The ghetto ===
On 20 December 1941 the Stanisławów Ghetto was set up officially, and closed from the outside. Walls were built (with three gates), and the windows facing out boarded up. Some 20,000 Jews were crammed there into a little space. Rationing was enforced, with insufficient food, and workshops set up to support the German war effort. Over the winter and until July 1942 most extrajudicial killings were carried out in Rudolf's Mill (Rudolfsmühle). From August 1942 onward the courtyard of the SiPo headquarters was used for that. On 22 August 1942, the Nazis held the reprisal Aktion for the murder of a Ukrainian collaborator, which they blamed on a Jew. More than 1,000 Jews were rounded up and shot at the cemetery. The leader of the Jewish council, Mordechai Goldstein, was hanged in public, along with 20 members of the Jewish Ghetto Police. Before taking them to the SiPo headquarters, policemen raped Jewish girls and women.

The Ghetto was reduced in size after the German and Ukrainian raid of 31 March 1942, and the burning of homes, in punishment for the council's noncompliance with the first deportation action. In April, September and November 1942 regular transports of Jews were sent in Holocaust trains to the Bełżec extermination camp north of the city. More Jews were brought in from smaller towns. About 11,000 Jewish captives subsisted in Stanisławów Ghetto when the next few Aktionen took place. On 24/25 January 1943 some 1,000 Jews without work permits were shot. Further 1,500–2,000 were deported to the Janowska concentration camp for extermination. On 22/23 February 1943, Brandt, who had succeeded Hans Krüger as SS-Hauptsturmführer, ordered the police forces to surround the ghetto in preparation for its final liquidation. The Aktion lasted for four days. Most victims were killed at the cemetery including the Jewish council. Soon later, the Germans put up announcements that Stanisławów was Judenfrei or free of Jews, nevertheless, the police continued searching the ghetto area for more victims until April. The last recorded Jews were murdered on 25 June 1943.

Just before the liquidation of the ghetto, a group of Jewish insurgents managed to escape. They formed a partisan unit called "Pantelaria" active on the outskirts of Stanisławów. The two commanders were young Anda Luft pregnant with her daughter Pantelaria (born in the forest), and Oskar Friedlender. Their greatest accomplishment was the ambush and execution of the German chief of police named Tausch. The group was attacked and destroyed by the Nazis in mid winter 1943–44. Anda and her new baby girl were killed.

There were rescue attempts during the ghetto liquidation. When the Jehovah's Witnesses learned that the Nazis planned to murder all Jews in the city, they organized an escape from the ghetto for a Jewish woman and her two daughters who later became Witnesses. They hid these Jewish women throughout the entire period of the war. Among the Christian Poles bestowed with the honour of Righteous Among the Nations were members of the Ciszewski family who hid in their home eleven Jews escaping deportation to Belzec extermination camp in September 1942. All survived. The Gawrych family hid five Jews until 8 March 1943, when they were raided by German policeman. Four Jews were shot and killed, and one (Szpinger) managed to escape. Jan Gawrych was arrested and subsequently was tortured and murdered. The Soviet army reached the city on 27 July 1944. Hidden by rescuers, there were about 100 Jewish Holocaust survivors liberated. In total about 1,500 Jews from Stanisławów survived the war elsewhere.

=== Aftermath ===
The commander of Stanisławów during the Bloody Sunday massacre German: SS-Hauptsturmführer Hans Krueger embarked on a successful career in West Germany after the war ended. He was a chairman of the Association of Germans from Berlin and Brandenburg, and lobbied on behalf of the League of Eastern Expellees representing the interests of former Nazis among others. He ran his own firm. Due in part to his life in the public eye, he was questioned by the authorities. Six years later, in October 1965 a formal indictment against Krueger was issued by the Dortmund State Prosecutor's Office. His trial lasted for two years. Krueger sparked outrage for his anti-Semitic outbursts. On 6 May 1968, the Münster State Court sentenced him to life imprisonment. He was released in 1986. Hans Krueger (1909–1988) is not to be confused with Oberamtsrichter Hans Krüger (1902–1971), an SS judge in occupied Poland, and President of the Federation of Expellees from 1959 to 1964 from CDU. Meanwhile, in 1966 there were other trial proceedings held in Vienna and Salzburg against members of the Schupo and the Gestapo police serving in Stanisławów during the war.

Following World War II, at the insistence of Joseph Stalin during Tehran Conference of 1943, Poland's borders were redrawn and Stanisławów (then again, Stanyslaviv) was incorporated into the Ukrainian Soviet Socialist Republic of the Soviet Union. Polish population was forcibly resettled back to new Poland before the end of 1946. The city was renamed after poet Ivan Franko in 1962 under Nikita Khrushchev. Since 1991, it is the capital of the Ivano-Frankivsk Oblast in sovereign Ukraine.

== Footnotes ==
a. The KdS stands for the Kommandateur der Sicherheitspolizei und des SD, or the Regional Command of the Sipo (Sicherheitspolizei) and SD (Sicherheitsdienst, the intelligence branch of the SS).
