= Hans Krüger (disambiguation) =

Hans Krüger may refer to:

- Hans Krüger (1902–1971), German Nazi politician, co-founder of Federation of Expellees
- Hans Krueger or Krüger (1909–1988), SS functionary responsible for the Czarny Las Massacre
