= Dem'ianiv Laz =

Mass burial site in Ukraine

Coordinates: 48°56′35″N 24°40′07″E

Massacre at Dem'ianiv Laz
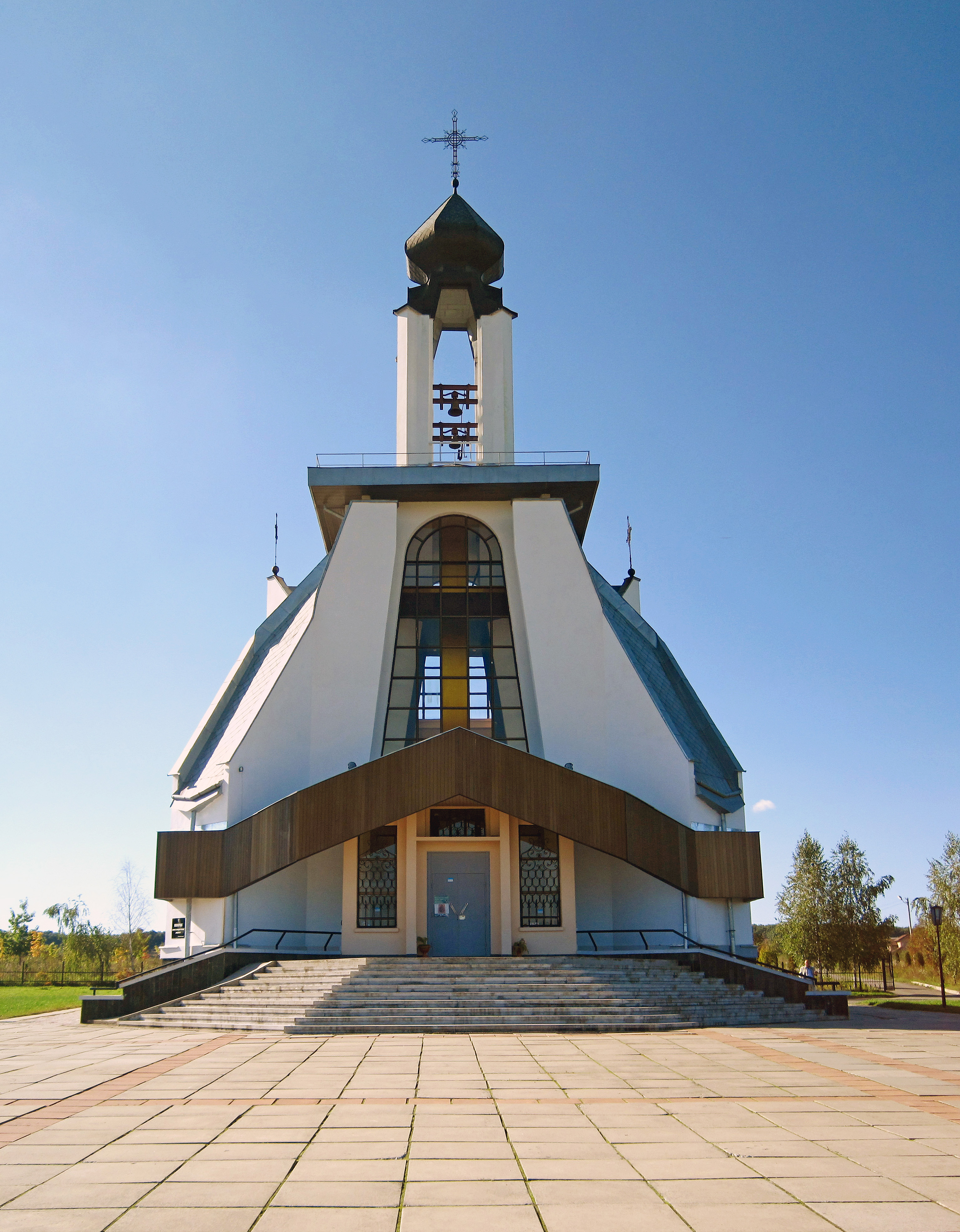
- The memorial complex "Dem'ianiv Laz"
- Location: Pasieczna (Now Pasichna), Soviet-occupied Poland, modern Ivano-Frankivsk
- Date: 1939–1941
- Attack type: Mass shooting
- Deaths: At least 524
- Perpetrator: NKVD

Dem'ianiv Laz (Ukrainian: Дем'янів Лаз, Polish: Demianów Łaz) is a mass burial site of victims of the Soviet extrajudicial killings committed following the Soviet invasion of Poland near Stanisławów (modern Ivano-Frankivsk, Ukraine). At least 524 captives (including 150 women with dozens of children) were shot by the NKVD and buried in several mass graves dug by the prisoners themselves in a small gorge outside of the city.

== Killings ==
The mass murder site was located in the vicinity of a small village called Pasieczna in Soviet-occupied Poland, in a gorge called Demianów Łaz at the outskirts of Stanisławów (Ivano-Frankivsk since 1962). Some of the earlier victims were killed in the infamous NKVD prison in Stanisławów; others were brought to the site ahead of time in order to dig mass graves prior to their own execution.

Among those executed, a majority were of Ukrainian origin and locals of the area and the horrors of these mass executions are still present in the minds of the Nation today. The mass graves of the Germans and the Soviets were in close proximity to each other in Dem'ianiv Laz. The excavators were able to identify who was responsible for each mass grave by the weapons used on the people and the markings they left behind on the remnants. The excavation of the bodies showed that the people were not only executed, but tortured before death. Both parties targeted a similar group of people: the educated (and their families), the rebellious, Jewish, homosexuals, and the disabled. The site is marked by a church where mass regularly takes place. Below the Church is a museum where visitors are able to learn more about the history of the site and the people affected.

== Cover-up ==
During World War II the grave site was first discovered by the German forces. After the war, in the 1960s the Soviet authorities tried to bulldoze the area in order to cover all traces of the crime. In 1970, following the Radio Liberty broadcast about Dem'ianiv Laz, the site's landscape was changed by heavy machinery to hinder any future attempts to excavate it. The cover-up continued almost until the end of the Soviet Union, as in 1984 and 1985 the site was further covered with rubble and debris of several demolished buildings.

Despite these efforts, in 1989 remains of more than 500 men, women and children were uncovered during excavation performed by a local branch of the Memorial society. Only 22 victims were identified by name and all were Polish citizens of either Polish or Ukrainian ethnicity. The memorial complex "Dem'ianiv Laz" was opened near the excavation site in 1998.

After the invasion in 1941, the German authorities under SS-Hauptsturmführer Hans Krueger perpetrated another Aktion against Polish intelligentsia called the Czarny Las Massacre. It was committed near the village of Pawełcze (Pawelce) several km away.

== See also ==
- Bykivnia graves, NKVD murder site near Kyiv
- NKVD prisoner massacres during World War II
