= Rabka =

Rabka may refer to the following places:

- Rabka, Tibet, a village in China
- Rabka-Zdrój, a town in Poland
