= Ponice =

- Village
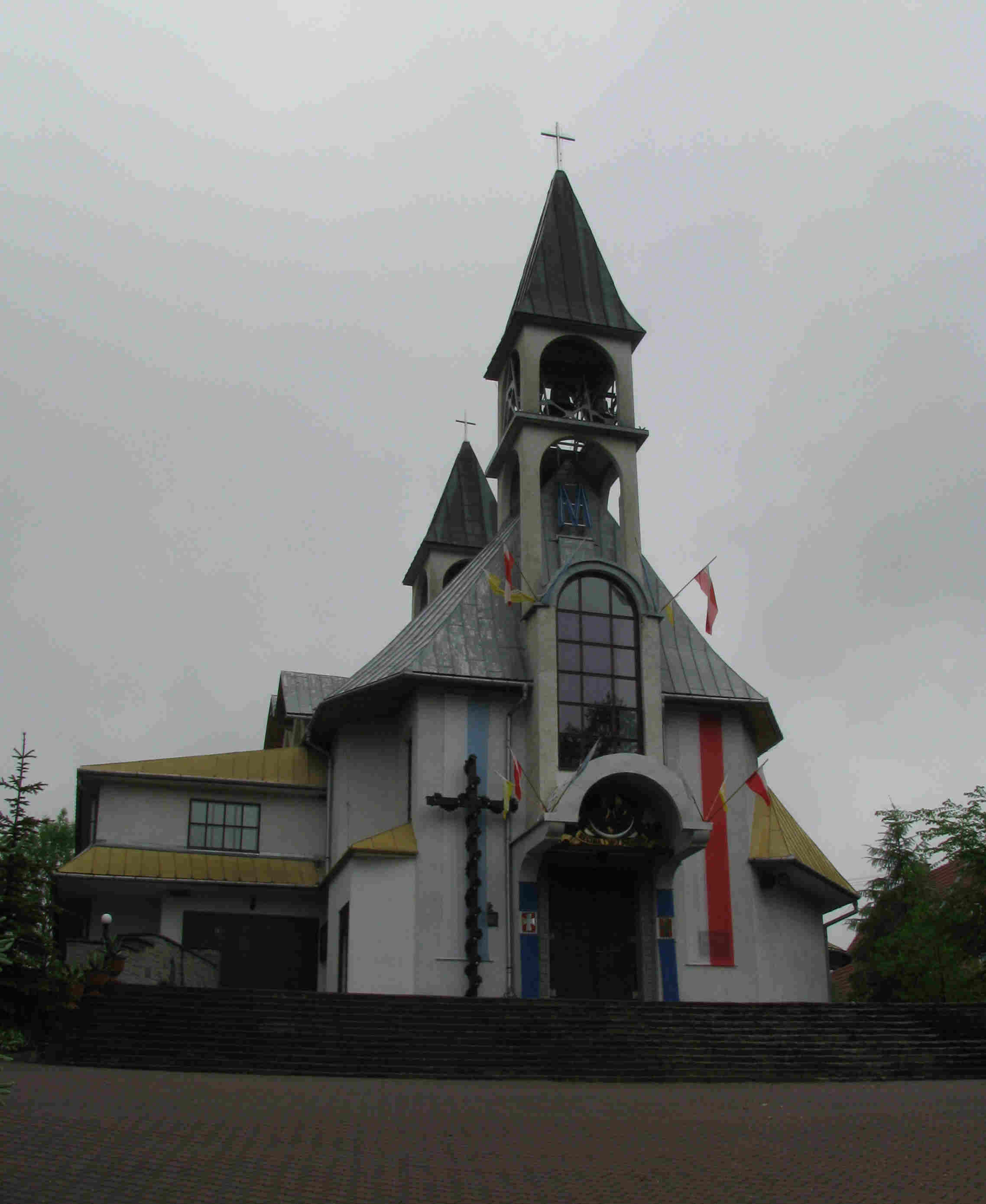
- Catholic church in Ponice

- Location within Poland
- Coordinates: 49°34′4″N 19°59′6″E
- Country: Poland
- Voivodeship: Lesser Poland
- County: Nowy Targ
- Gmina: Rabka-Zdrój

Ponice [pɔˈnit͡sɛ] is a village on the Poniczanka River, in Nowy Targ County, by the northwestern slopes of the Gorcy mountains in Poland.

To the west it borders on Rdzawka and Rabka, to the east on Slonne, and to the south on Obidowa. The southeastern part is covered with woods, and along the northeastern border stretches the mountain range Turbacz (940 meters). It is in these woods, from the slope of Obidowa (1,027 metres), that the stream Poniczanka originates. The village's buildings lie in the valley of this stream; the higher part of the village is called Krupowe Działo.

In 1870 there were 125 houses and 894 inhabitants; in 1880 there were 136 houses and 843 inhabitants, of whom 842 were Roman Catholics and one was Jewish. As of 1870, the area of the major estate [i. e., property registered under the ownership of nobles] numbered 3 morgs of farmland, 8 of pastures, and 888 of forests; the minor estate [property owned by peasants] had 1,185 Austrian morgs of farmland, 49 of meadows and gardens, 161 of pastures, and 144 of forests. [It is served by] the Roman Catholic parish church in Rabka, and there is a private chapel in the village; the county court and tax office is in Nowy Targ, and the post and telegraph office is in Rabka (5 km (3 mi). away). The owner of the registered estate is Julian Zubrzycki. [Br{onislaw} G{ustawicz}, Vol. 8, page 767.
