= Sipo-SD Academy =

Nazi Training School

The Sipo-SD Academy was an SS training school established by former Einstatzgruppen SS-Brigadeführer Bruno Streckenbach designed to train students in various torture and execution methods as well as to provide continuing education to the senior command structure. The school was originally located in Zakopane but was later relocated to Rabka in July 1940 and then later to Berlin in 1945. It is estimated that over 2000 Jews from 30 neighboring villages were imprisoned, executed, and buried on the school grounds in Rabka.

== Zakopane ==
After the Nazis had completed their initial invasion of Poland, they quickly took control of a large hotel in Zakopane known as "The Palace", which was converted into a headquarters for the Gestapo. The cellar of the hotel was used as a makeshift interrogation facility and prison for Jews accused of breaking Nazi laws.

The leadership at this time initially included Robert Philipp Weissmann, and his deputy, Richard Arno Sehmisch, but on April 20, 1940 SS-Untersturmführer Wilhelm Rosenbaum was appointed as the Police Secretary and SS-Hauptsturmführer Hans Krüger was made the commandant.

According to witnesses who later survived the war, over 300 people (mostly Jewish women and children) were murdered here. The hotel soon become known as "Death's hand Resort" by the locals.

== Rabka ==
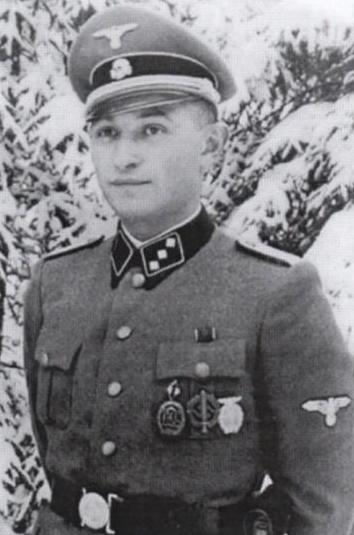
Wilhelm Rosenbaum

Upon arrival in the town of Rabka, the school initially occupied a Jewish children's sanatorium (named "Frankel's summer camp for Jewish children"). The school quickly relocated to a much larger campus at a girls' school named "Theresianeum," which had a four-story building.

Hans Kruger remained the commandant until July 1940, after which time he was recalled to Krakow. After Kruger left, SS Hauptsturmfuhrer Rudolf Voigtlander was appointed commandant for a short time, but for unknown reasons, Wilhelm Rosenbaum was appointed commandant weeks later. Rosenbaum had "Befehlshaber der Sicherheitspolizei und des SD im GG Schule des Sicherheitspolizei" displayed across the top floor of the school and a large black flag and swastika flown on the roof. The majority of the facilities were constructed using the forced labor of the Jewish workers and with building materials looted from the Jewish cemeteries in the area, most notably the one in Nowy Targ.

== Students and Classes ==
Students for the school were recruited from across the Reich, but mainly from the Security Services, Polish Police officers, Ukrainian security collaborators, and the more established training camp of Trawniki, near Lublin. Ukrainian candidates were required to be healthy men eighteen to thirty-five years old.

The Academy was also used by the senior command officers for completion of pre-promotion and refresher courses. These courses lasted between 3 – 6 months and were taught by Nazi elites such as Hans Frank who participated in the growth of politics leading to genocide in Poland.

Organization and Law	SD - Domestic	Gestapo	Kripo	SD -Foreign	6. Ideology
A. Legislation	A. Legal Practice	A. Border Police	A. Policy	A. General	A. Evaluation -Jews
B. Indemnification	B. Ethnos	B. Enemies	B. Crimes	B. German - Italian Sphere	
C. Reich Defence	C. Culture	C. Communism	C. Identification	C. Russo- Japanese Sphere	
D. Confiscations	D. Economy	D. Sabotage	D. Kriminal Institute	D. West	
E. Passports		E. Liberalism		E. Investigation	
F. Budgets		F. Assassinations		F. Technical Matters	
G. Technical Matters		G. Sects			
		H. Catholicism			
		I. Protestantism			
		J. Freemasonry			
		K. Evacuations and Jews			
		L. Card Files			
		M. Spheres of Influence			
		N. Counter Intelligence			
		O. Treason			

== Jewish Workers ==
About 200 Jews were kept imprisoned on the school grounds at any time. The workers were used for training and construction at the school, when they had outlived their perceived usefulness, they were executed and replaced with new Jews. The local Judenrat provided the Jewish laborers for the school, among them was Paul Beck who was appointed as the liaison between the Jews and the Germans. In July 1940 when the school was moved from Zakopane to Rabka a number of the Jewish workers were selected by Rosenbaum (among them Beck) to move as well.

It is said by Jewish witnesses that Rosenbaum would remove anybody with red hair or glasses from the school grounds and send them to Belzec extermination camp by train. As the training schedule at the school ramped up, Jews were simply snatched off the streets to meet the increasing demand for new training subjects. A majority of the Jews that were abducted and imprisoned were used as live training targets to be used on the shooting range for the schools regularly scheduled "target practice" of which Rosenbaum was said to be in regular attendance.

The Ghetto in Nowy Sacz run by Gestapo Chief SS-Obersturmfuehrer Heinrich Hamann was eventually called upon by Rosenbaum to provide additional Jews to meet an ever-increasing demand, The Ghetto quickly became the main source of the Jews held at the school. The first transport was organized from Nowy Sacz by Herr Swoboda, who was head of the Employment department for Jewish Workers. The first transport consisted of about 60 to 80 Healthy and fit men between the ages of 15-40, upon arrival they were sorted into work groups by Paul Beck. These workers were responsible for the construction of the shooting range, which required enormous effort to flatten the land to create a clear line of sight. In July 1942 an additional transport of Jews was received from Nowy Sacz by SS-Scharfuehrers Bohnert and Proch, several of these Jews were murdered on the way to the school.

== Torture and Executions ==
The school grounds were the site of numerous atrocities against Jewish men, women, and children. Wilhelm Rosenbaum was directly involved in most of the atrocities that occurred on the school grounds. Rosenbaum showed a distinct lack of compassion for his victims displayed through the cruelty in his punishments. Several Jewish witnesses declared that Rosenbaum would "hack hands and feet off Jewish children, then ordered the children tied to trees, and then proceeded to shoot these atrociously tortured human targets himself". Rosenbaum took particular pleasure in inflicting religious anguish on the Jews and was frequently heard shouting "Where is your God now, you damned Jews?" before executing them.

May 20, 1942, Rosenbaum ordered through the Judenrat at least 45 "old and disabled Jews" from Rabka to be brought to the school the next morning. Later that day he had the school's Jewish workers dig a mass grave in the woods behind the school. That following night the Jews provided by the Judenrat were executed with gunshots to the head and kicked into the grave, the bodies were then covered with lime and cleared over with dirt by the workers. Rosenbaum is said to have personally killed six.

May 26, 1942, Rosenbaum brought 8 preselected Jews before a class that was assembled around a mass grave in the forest behind the school. The grave was dug by Jewish workers earlier in the day and shot each one in the back of the neck himself. Later that evening, 60 additional Jews were brought to the mass grave, along with another class of students, and each Jew was made to undress before being shot in the head. Rosenbaum personally demonstrated how each execution was to happen.

July 1942, Rosenbaum personally oversaw and gave instruction on how to execute 59 Jews who were then buried in a mass grave in the forest behind the school which was dug by the Jewish workers earlier that day.

August 1942, After a group of Jews who briefly escaped from the school grounds were apprehended, 10 Jews involved in the escape (which included a member of the Judenrat and Rosenbaum's "Boot Boy") were publicly hanged in front of 150 other Jews who were forced by Rosenbaum to watch the entire process in order to dissuade any further escape attempts. Rosenbaum's Boot Boy Edek Liebenheimer, who was reportedly quite young, was unsuccessfully hanged twice when the rope broke both times before remaining intact on the third attempt. Liebenheimer is said to have asked to be shot instead, with Rosenbaum insisting that he be hanged. The victims of the hangings were taken to a mass grave in the woods and buried by the Jewish workers.

== SS Corruption investigation ==
The school and its leadership became the subject of an internal SS investigation in 1943 that was set into motion by Reichsführer SS Himmler regarding the theft of Jewish property for their own self-enrichment. Upon learning about the impending investigation, the leadership at the school ordered the Jewish liaison Paul Beck to be executed immediately as he had the most intimate knowledge about the nefarious activities and black market dealings at the school. The investigation culminated with a near complete purge of the schools current staff. Rosenbaum was relieved of his duties and sent to desk duty in Krakow. SS- Captain Fritz Herrmann was appointed as the new Commandant with SS-Captain Wilhelm Teege serving as his deputy.

== Post Investigation ==
The school was relocated to Berlin in 1945 where it is said the curriculum included more traditional studies such as General war conditions and regulations. Interestingly Rosenbaum himself was forced to attend a refresher course at the very school he was ousted from on January 3, 1945.

== Other Staff ==
SS-Scharführer Wosdolowicz - transferred to Rabka from Zakopane to supervise and train Ukrainian recruits.

SS-Scharführer Jaworski - transferred to Rabka from Zakopane to supervise and train Ukrainian recruits.

SS-Scharführer Vasilko - transferred to Rabka from Zakopane to supervise and train Ukrainian recruits.

SS-Oberscharführer Bohnert - Training Command

Hermann Schippler - Training Command

SS-Scharführer Bandura - Driver

SS-Scharführer Dziuba - Clerical Officer

SS-Scharführer Otto Schroff - Administrator of school premises

SS-Oberscharführer Hermann Oder - Oversight of orderly rooms

SS-Hauptscharführer Walter Proch - Deputy to Rosenbaum (July 1942)

SS-Hauptscharführer Pohland Deputy to Rosenbaum (July 1942)

Meta Kück, Schindler, and Engelmann were secretary to Rosenbaum and later acted as witnesses.
