= Karolina Lanckorońska =

Polish WWII resistance fighter, historian (1898–2002)

Countess Karolina Lanckorońska
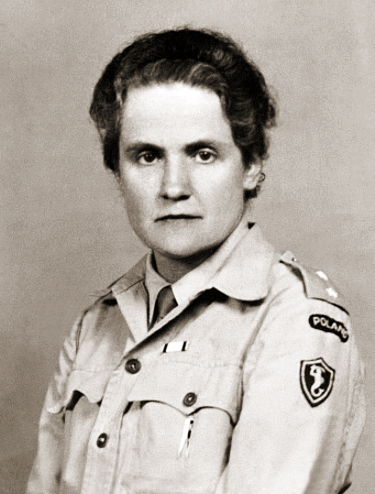
- Lanckorońska in 1945
- Born: 11 August 1898; Buchberg am Kamp (de), Gars am Kamp, Austria-Hungary
- Died: 25 August 2002 (aged 104); Rome, Italy
- Burial place: Campo Verano, Rome
- Occupations: Philanthropist, educator, and historian
- Known for: Anti-Nazi resistance

Countess Karolina Maria Adelajda Franciszka Ksawera Małgorzata Edina Lanckorońska (Polish pronunciation: [ka.rɔˈlʲi.na lant͡skɔˈrɔɲska] 11 August 1898 — 25 August 2002) was a Polish noble, World War II resistance fighter, philanthropist, and historian.

Lanckorońska bequeathed her family's enormous art collection to Poland only after her homeland became free from communism and Soviet domination during the Revolutions of 1989. The Lanckoronski Collection may now, for the most part, be seen in Warsaw's Royal Castle and Kraków's Wawel Castle.

== Life ==
Lanckorońska was born in Gars am Kamp, Lower Austria, the daughter of Count Karol Lanckoroński, a Polish nobleman from a Galician family, and his third wife, Princess Margarethe Lichnowsky von Woschütz, the daughter of Prince Karl Max Lichnowsky.

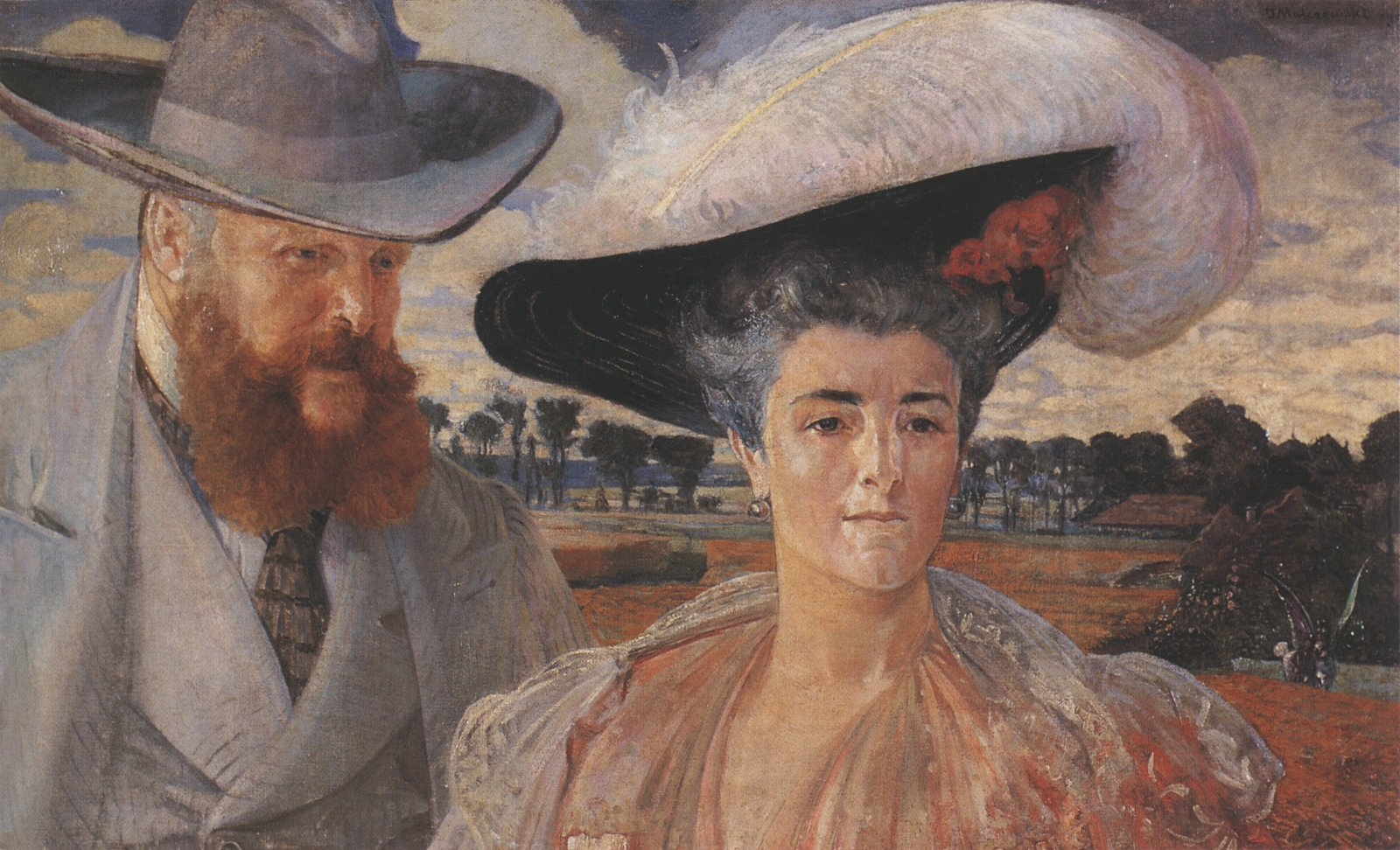
Lanckorońska's parents, by Jacek Malczewski

Reared and educated in Vienna (capital of the Austro-Hungarian Empire, of which much of partitioned Poland was a part), where she attended university. She lived at her family's palace, the Palais Lanckoroński. After Poland regained independence in 1918, Lanckorońska taught at Lwów University. She earned her Ph.D. in History of Art in 1934, habilitated in 1936 by Poland's Ministry of Education.

Following the invasion of Poland, including Lwów, by the Soviet Red Army along with the attack on Poland by Nazi Germany in September 1939, she witnessed at first hand the terror and atrocities committed by the Soviets and Nazis, which she later described in her War Memoirs.

Lanckorońska was active in the Polish resistance and was arrested, interrogated, tortured, tried and sentenced to death at Stanisławów prison. During her stay there, the local Gestapo chief Hans Krueger (also spelled Krüger), confessed to her that he had murdered 23 Lwów University professors, a war crime that she made it her mission to publicize.

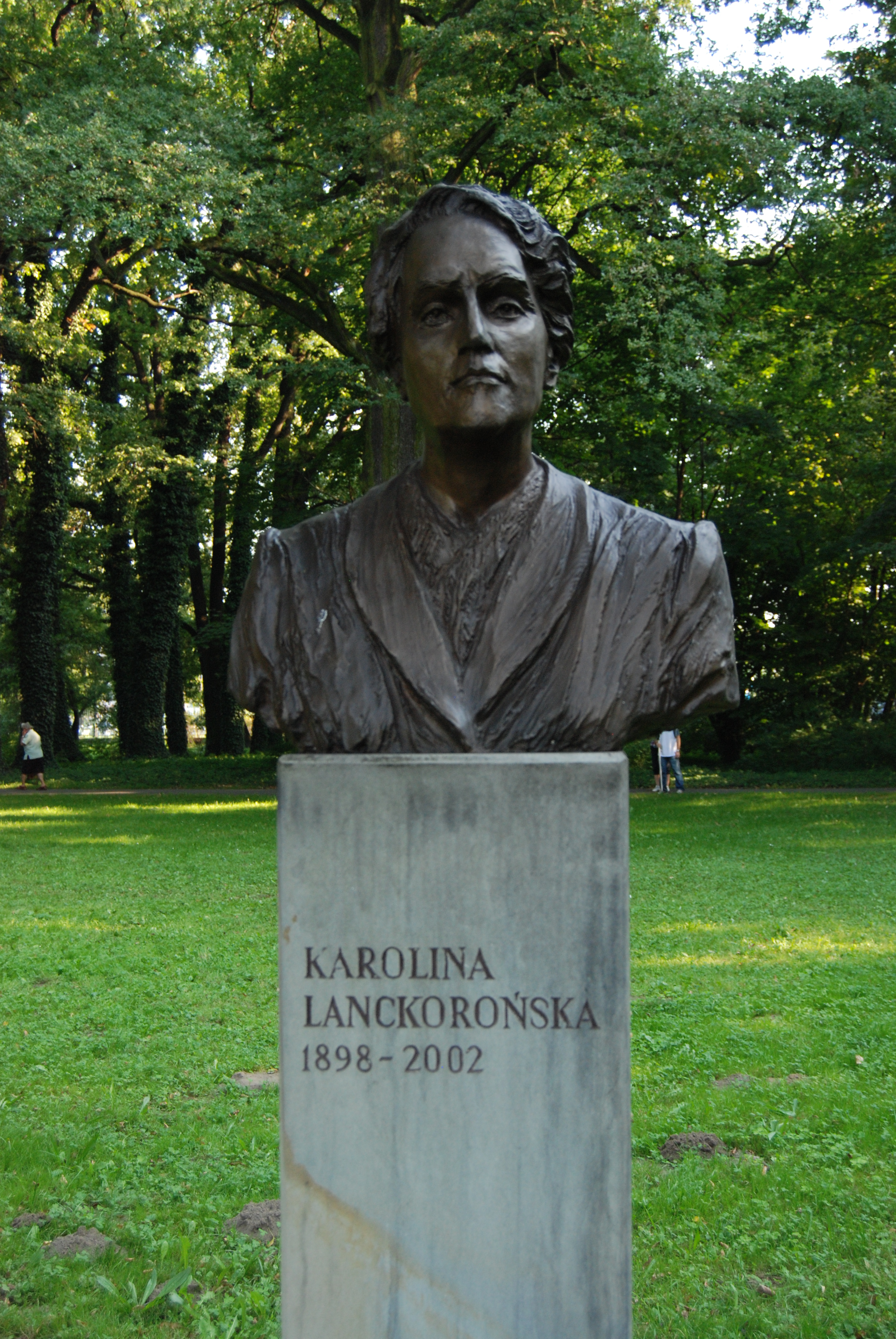
A bust of Lanckoronska in Henryk Jordan Park in Kraków

Karolina was liberated from the Stanisławów prison through the fortuitous intercession of her distant cousin the Italian nobleman and musician Roffredo Caetani, who having heard of her arrest, interceded with the wife of the heir to the Italian throne. Himmler himself then ordered her arrest after being embarrassed by the remonstrations of the Italian government about her mistreatment.

Lanckorońska was then sent to the Ravensbrück concentration camp for women. She somehow survived and, immediately after release in 1945, wrote her war memoirs. After the war, she left Poland and lived in Fribourg, Switzerland, and later, until her death, in Rome.

She did not want her war memoirs published in her lifetime. After much persuasion, however, she consented to publication in Poland, by Znak Publishing of Kraków, in 2001, just a year before her death. The book, whose British version is titled Those Who Trespass against Us: One Woman's War against the Nazis, sold over 50,000 copies in the Polish original and is now selling well in English. The U.S. edition was published in hardback in Spring 2007 by Da Capo Press (Perseus Publishing Group) under the new title Michelangelo in Ravensbrück.

In 1967, Lanckorońska established the Lanckoroński Foundation, which promotes and supports Polish culture, awarding over a million zlotys per annum (US $330,000) for scholarships, publication of learned books, research into Polish archives in countries such as Lithuania, Belarus and Ukraine, and similar projects.

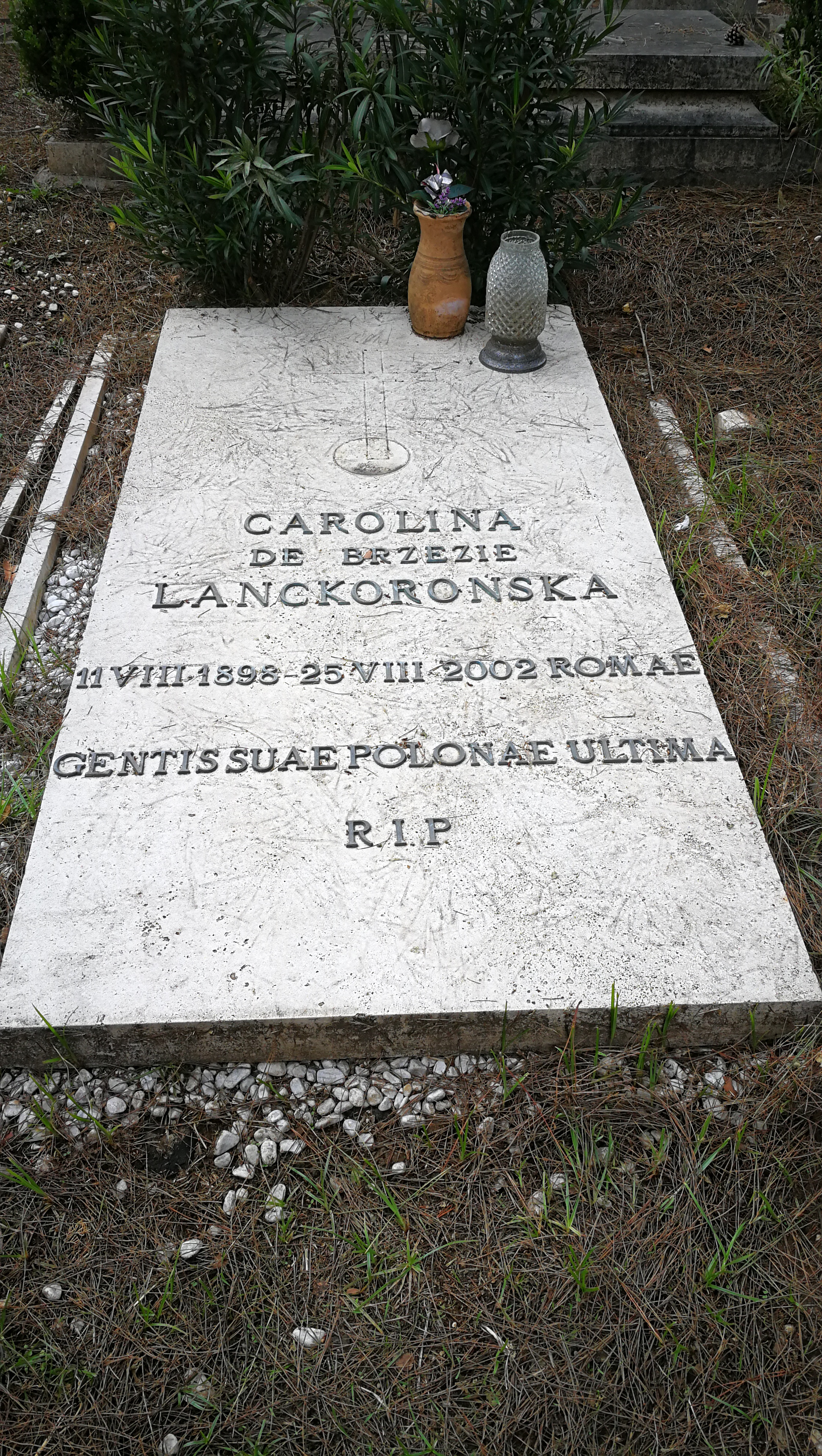
Tombstone of Professor Karolina Lanckorońska at the Campo Verano cemetery in Rome

Countess Karolina Lanckorońska died in 2002 in Rome, Italy, aged 104, and is buried at the Campo Verano. Her final resting place is located in the 38th quarter (also called foreigners quarter - riquadro stranieri) of the XIX Vecchio Reparto sector.

== Works ==
Coat of arms of Counts Lanckoroński

- Karolina Lanckorońska, Wspomnienia wojenne (War Memoirs), Kraków, Znak Publishing, 2001, ISBN 83-240-0077-1
- Karolina Lanckorońska, Mut ist angeboren (Courage Is Inborn), Vienna, Boehlau Verlag, 2003, ISBN 3-205-77086-2
- Karolina Lanckorońska, Those Who Trespass against Us: One Woman's War against the Nazis, Pimlico, 2006, ISBN 1-84413-417-2, 366 pp.
- Karolina Lanckorońska, Michelangelo in Ravensbrück: One Woman's War against the Nazis, translated from the Polish by Noel Clark, Merloyd Lawrence Books / Da Capo, 2007, 341 pp., ISBN 978-0306816116

== Honours and awards ==
- Grand Cross of the Order of Polonia Restituta (1991)
- Cross of Valour (1942)
- Bronze Cross of Merit with Swords (1946)
- Home Army Cross (1968)
- Order of Merit of the Italian Republic (1997)
- Commander's Cross with Star of the Order of St. Gregory the Great, awarded by Pope John Paul II for her 100th birthday
- Honorary doctorate from the Jagiellonian University (1983), Polish University Abroad (1988), University of Wrocław (1990)

== See also ==
- List of Poles
- Czarny Las Massacre
