= Gmina Rabka-Zdrój =

Gmina Rabka-Zdrój Rabka-Zdrój Commune
- Gmina
- Coat of arms
- Interactive map of Gmina Rabka-Zdrój
- Coordinates (Rabka-Zdrój): 49°37′N 19°58′E
- Country: Poland
- Voivodeship: Lesser Poland
- County: Nowy Targ
- Seat: Rabka-Zdrój

Area
  - Total: 69.02 km^{2} (26.65 sq mi)

Population (2006)
  - Total: 17,190
  - Density: 249.1/km^{2} (645.1/sq mi)
  - Urban: 13,031
  - Rural: 4,159
- Website: http://www.rabka.pl

Gmina Rabka-Zdrój is an urban-rural gmina (administrative district) in Nowy Targ County, Lesser Poland Voivodeship, in southern Poland. Its seat is the town of Rabka-Zdrój, which lies approximately 18 kilometres (11 mi) north of Nowy Targ and 50 km (31 mi) south of the regional capital Kraków.

The gmina covers an area of 69.02 square kilometres (26.6 sq mi), and as of 2006 its total population is 17,190 (out of which the population of Rabka-Zdrój amounts to 13,031, and the population of the rural part of the gmina is 4,159).

== Villages ==
Apart from the town of Rabka-Zdrój, the gmina contains the villages of Chabówka, Ponice and Rdzawka.

== Neighbouring gminas ==
Gmina Rabka-Zdrój is bordered by the gminas of Lubień, Mszana Dolna, Niedźwiedź, Nowy Targ and Raba Wyżna.
