= Michelangelo in Ravensbrück =

Memoir by Countess Karolina Lanckorońska

- Cover of memoir, 2008 print
- Author: Karolina Lanckorońska
- Language: English
- Subject: Invasion of Poland
- Genre: History
- Publisher: Da Capo Press
- Publication date: 2008
- Publication place: United States
- Media type: Paperback
- Pages: 372
- ISBN: 0306816113

Michelangelo in Ravensbrück: One Woman's War against the Nazis is a memoir by Karolina Lanckorońska, a World War II resistance fighter and postwar historian who survived the Ravensbrück concentration camp for women and after liberation went on to record the history of this lesser known side of the Holocaust in occupied Poland. Initially, Lanckorońska did not want her war memoir published in her lifetime. However, after much persuasion she consented to publication in Poland, by ZNAK Publishing of Kraków in 2001, a year before her death. The book, whose British version is titled Those Who Trespass against Us: One Woman's War against the Nazis, sold over 50,000 copies in the Polish original and is now selling well in English. The U.S. edition was published in hardback in Spring 2007 by Da Capo Press (Perseus Publishing Group) under the new title, Michelangelo in Ravensbrück.

== Narrative ==
Despite the implications of the book title, the actual narrative is in most part devoted to activities which preceded the author's imprisonment at the camp. Lanckorońska describes the German invasion of Poland and the events surrounding the Soviet invasion of Poland witnessed and experienced first hand while in her home city of Lwów.
