= Rdzawka =

- Village
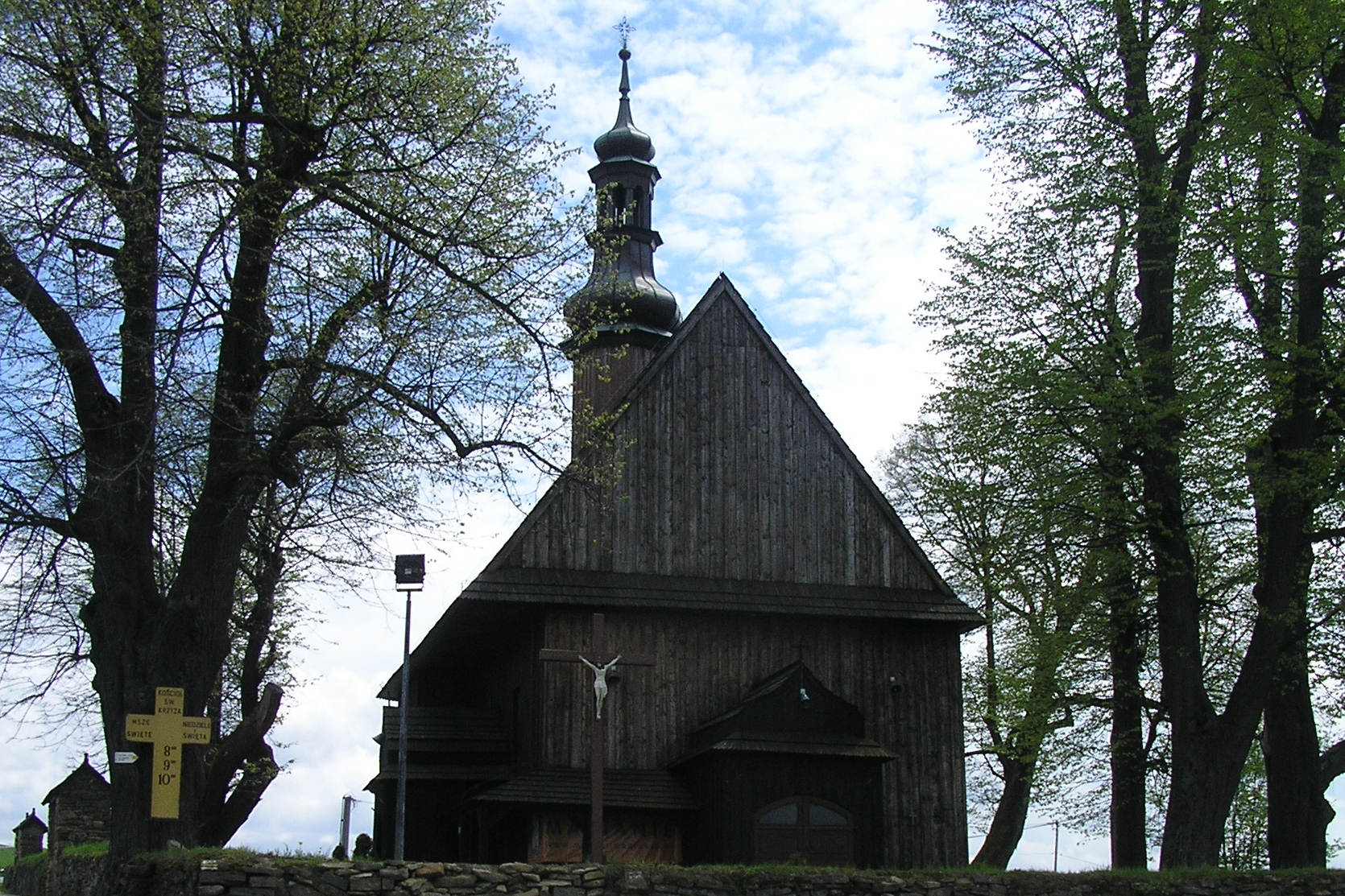
- Church of the Holy Cross

- Location within Poland
- Coordinates: 49°35′N 19°59′E
- Country: Poland
- Voivodeship: Lesser Poland
- County: Nowy Targ
- Gmina: Rabka-Zdrój

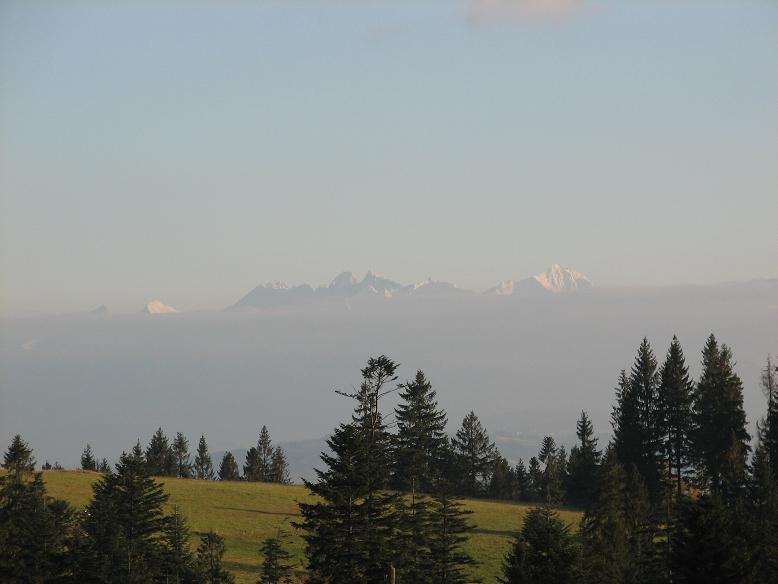
View of the Tatra Mountains

Rdzawka [ˈrd͡zafka] is a village in the administrative district of Gmina Rabka-Zdrój, within Nowy Targ County, Lesser Poland Voivodeship, in southern Poland.
