= Rabka-Zdrój =

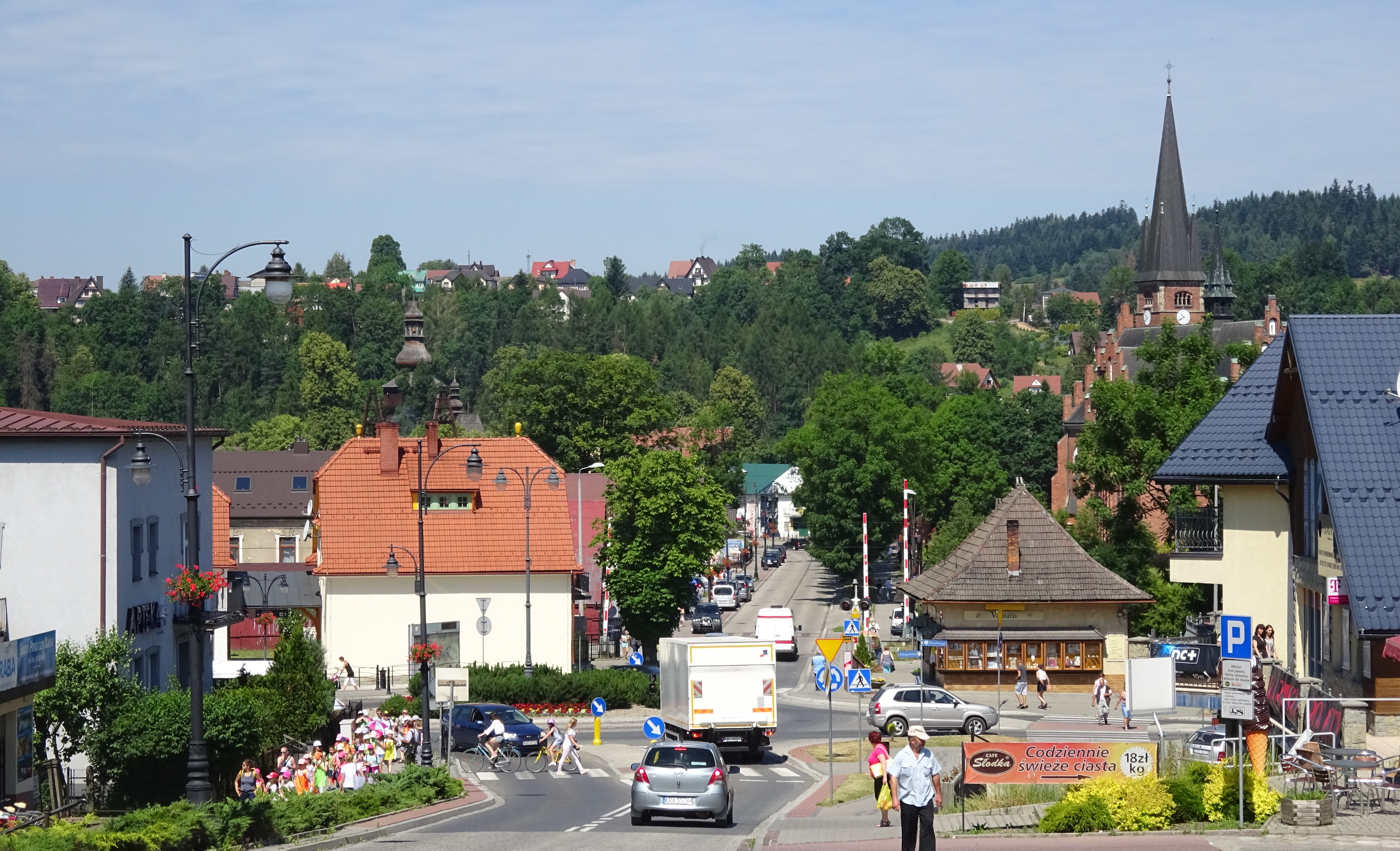
- Town centre

- Flag Coat of arms
- Interactive map of Rabka-Zdrój
- Location within Poland
- Coordinates: 49°36′30″N 19°58′0″E
- Country: Poland
- Voivodeship: Lesser Poland
- County: Nowy Targ
- Gmina: Rabka-Zdrój

Area
  - Total: 36.59 km^{2} (14.13 sq mi)
- Highest elevation: 560 m (1,840 ft)
- Lowest elevation: 470 m (1,540 ft)

Population (2020)
  - Total: 12,662
  - Density: 346.1/km^{2} (896.3/sq mi)
- Postal code: 34-700
- Website: www.rabka.pl

Rabka-Zdrój (pronounced [ˈrapka ˈzdrui̯], Goral: Robka, colloquially: Rabka) is a spa town in Lesser Poland Voivodeship, Poland. It is located between Kraków and Zakopane in a valley on the northern slopes of the Gorce Mountains, where the rivers Poniczanka and Słonka join the river Raba. It has about 13,000 inhabitants. There is a substantial population of Gorals in the town.

Rabka was always known for its salt-works, and from 1864 became a popular spa town. The first treatment centre for children was established a few years later and continues to this day. Hydrotherapy continues to be utilised in local hospital and sanatoriums.

The Władysław Orkan Museum established in a former 17th-century larch-wood church, includes a collection of folk sculpture and paintings on glass. It also houses the "Order of the Smile Museum" (which children award to adults) and hosts events such as a winter carnival, the Carpathian Festival of Children's Regional Ensembles and the Mountain Children's Holiday International Festival. Other entertainment and folk events are held in the summer season.

== History ==
The name was first mentioned by Jan Długosz, who, referring to a document issued by Bolesław V the Chaste in 1254, recorded it as Sal in Rabschcyca. This would indicate that Rabka's brine springs were already known at that time and were probably used by the Cistercian monasery, whose estates included Rabka.

In 1595, the village, situated in Szczyrzyc County in the Kraków Voivodeship, was owned by Anna Jordanowa née Sieniawska, wife of the Castellan of Kraków.

As Eugeniusz Janota wrote in 1860 in his Guide o Excursions to Babia Góra, the Tatra Mountains and the Pieniny Mountains: "To the east of this village, toward the hamlet called Słone, situated on the Słonka stream, there are six springs of salty, iodine-bromine and ferruginous water. From timme immemorial, the Beskid highlanders used them to cure goitres. However, following a report submitted by a physician, in 1813 they were blocked with stones by order of the government and guarded to prevent people from drawing water from them. The name of one of these springs, located on the manor grounds, Za Szybiskiem, suggests that mines once existed here, undoubtedly salt mines."

Research conducted in 1858 by the Kraków chemist Adolf Aleksandrowicz and the physician Fryderyk Skobel established that the locar brine springs were among the strongest iodine-bromine brines in Europe. As E. Janota noted in the aforementioned guide, the temperature of the springs was approximately +12°C, while their specific gravity varied. One pound of water from one spring contained 126.41 grains of medicinal substances, and water from another containded 177.6 grains, including chlorine, iodine, bromine, alkaline, carbonates, iron and some lime, as well as carbonic acid. The first bathing and therapeutic establishment was founded in 1864, and eight years later a children's treatment centre was opened. Rabka's distinctive microclimate allowed it to develop rapidly, particularly as a children's health resort.

During the Geman occupation, in 1941, the Germans established a ghetto for the town's Jewish residents. Approximately 650 Jews were confined there. In August 1942, they were deported to the Bełżec extermination camp, while some were transferred to the ghetto in Nowy Targ.

During World War II, the Germans established a Nazi police school called the Sipo-SD Academy in the town, to train executioners and torturers. The school and its surroundings were the place of numerous atrocities before it was eventually closed down as the war approached its end and the Germans left.

The Commandant of the school was originally SS Hauptsturmfuhrer Hans Krueger and the deputy and police secretary was SS Untersturmfuhrer Wilhelm Karl Johannes Rosenbaum. The Nazi Police training school was originally situated in Zakopane, but was moved to Rabka in July 1940 along with the permanent staff and the Jewish workers.

It has been estimated that over thirty Jewish roundups were conducted on the neighborhoods surrounding the school. The rounded up Jews were executed inside the school and in the woods behind the school with particularly pious Jews being treated the worst. To cover up the numerous murders at the school Rosenbaum ordered the Rabka Town Clerk, Cheslav Triboski, to register their deaths as “victims of heart attacks.”

After the Second World War, Rabka, alongside Zakopane, was an important centre for the treatment of tuberculosis. When tuberculosis ceased to be regarded as a major social disease, the sanatioria, including the largest ones, the Institute of Mother and Child from Warsaw and the W. Pstrowski Silesian Children's Rehabilitation Centre, became institutions specialising mainly in the treatment of bronchial asthma and diseases of the upper respiratory tract.

Rabka was granted municipal rights in 1853.

From 1975 to 1998, it was located within the Nowy Sącz Voivodeship.

== Notable people ==
- Łukasz Jarosz (born 1979), heavyweight boxer
- Maria Kaczyńska, married to Lech Kaczyński (former President of Poland), was educated in Rabka.
- Andrzej Bargiel (born 1988), ski mountaineer, backcountry skier, mountain runner and climber
- Jan Ziobro (born 1991), ski jumper

== Gallery ==
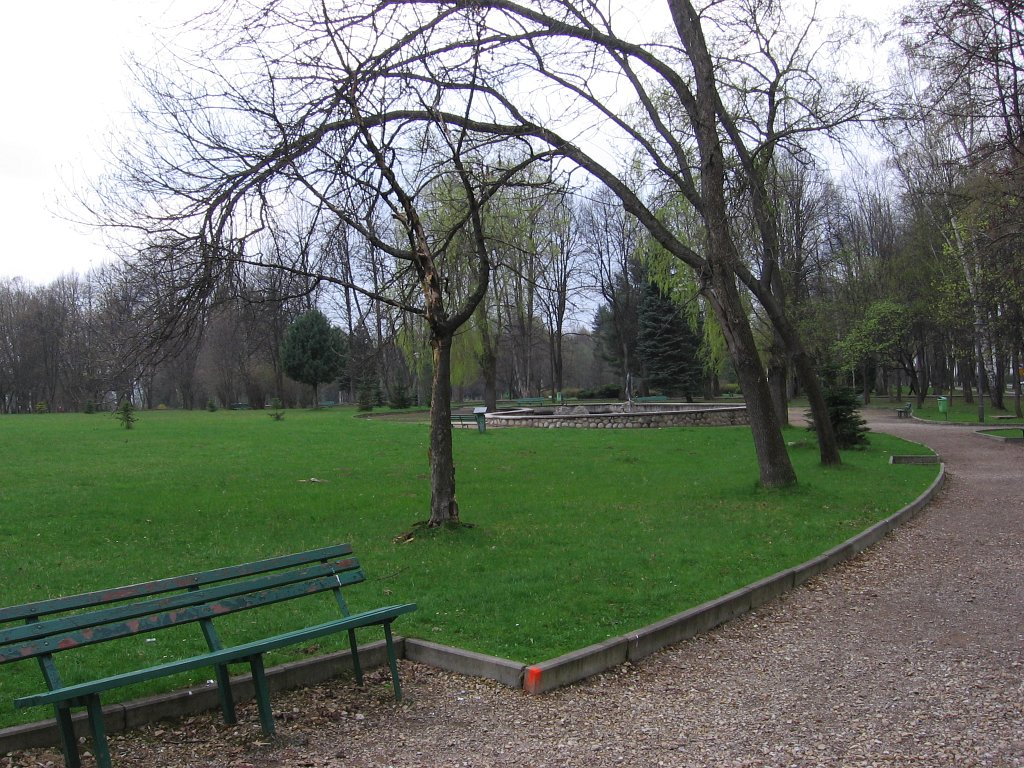
A park in Rabka-Zdrój

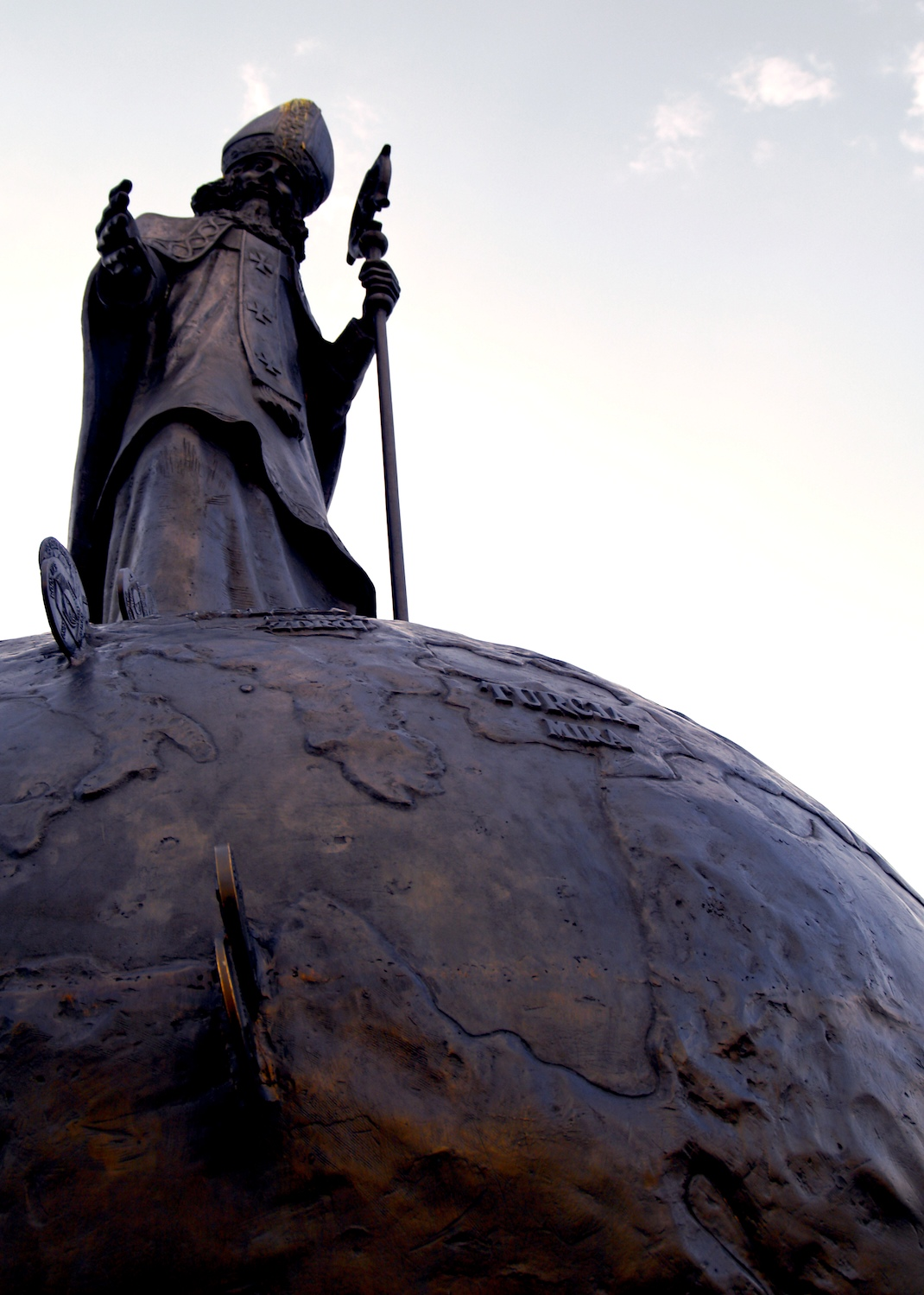
Statue of Saint Nicholas, patron saint of Rabka

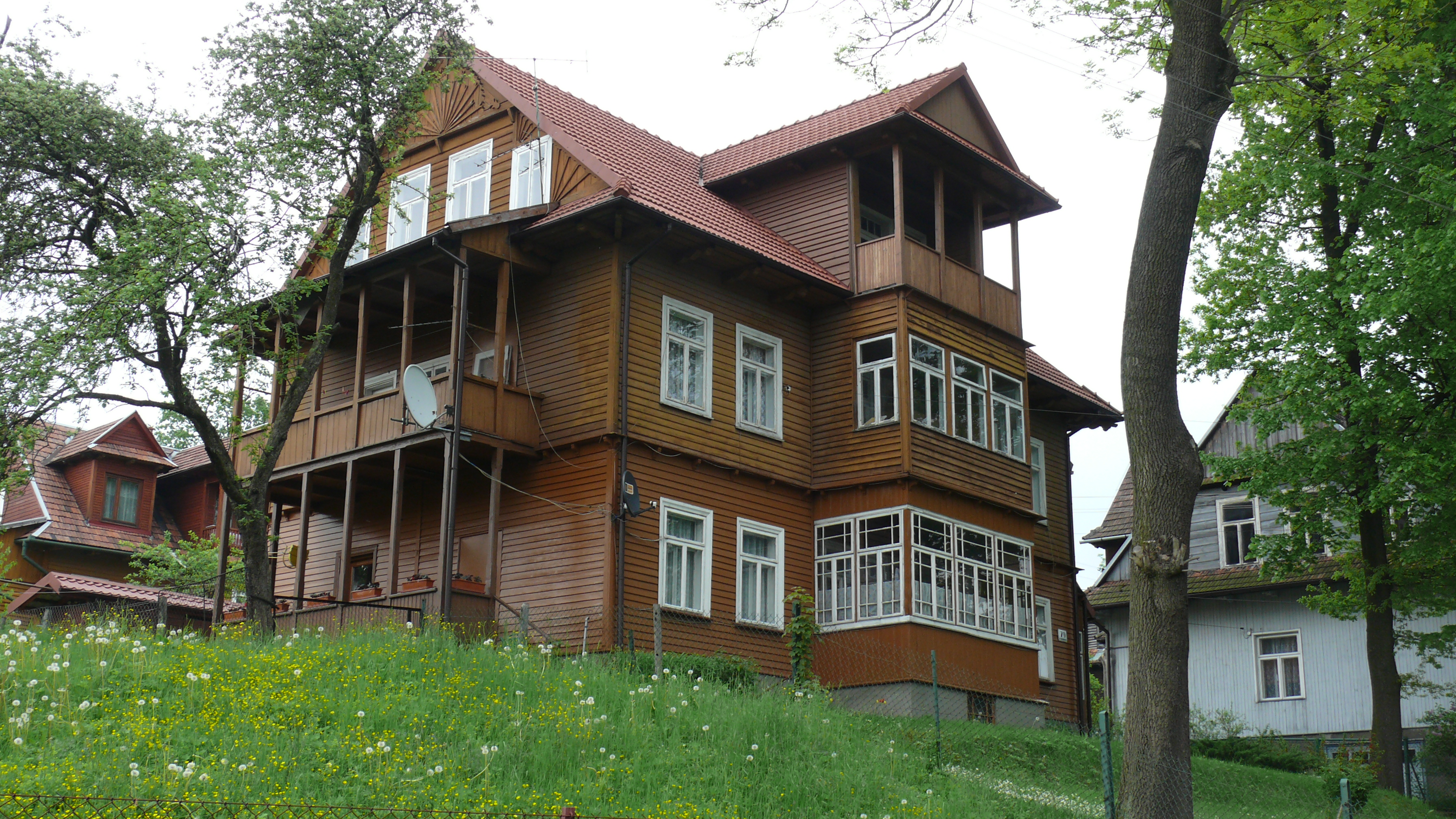
Historic wood-frame house
