= Wilhelm Rosenbaum =

German SS Officer (1914–1984)

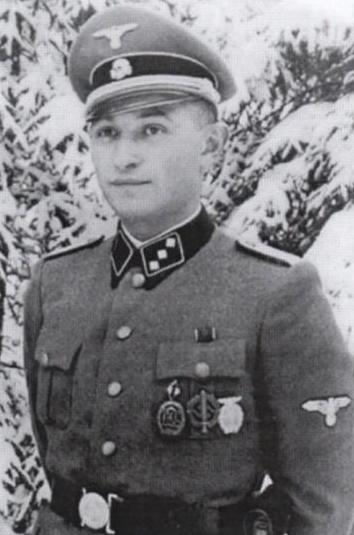

Wilhelm Karl Johannes Rosenbaum (27 April 1915 – 4 April 1984) was a German SS officer who was involved in numerous murders and other war crimes committed during World War II at the Sipo-SD Academy where he maintained a leadership role through a majority of its earlier years.

== Family ==
Wilhelm Rosenbaum was born on 27 April 1915 in Prenzlauer Berg, Berlin. His father, Peter Rosenbaum, was a municipal worker at the markets of Alexanderplatz. His biological mother died when he was just one year old. His father re-married, which resulted in a stepbrother named Wilhelm Franz. The second marriage was dissolved after about three years. In about 1917-18, his father married a third time. From this marriage comes another stepbrother, Kurt, who was born in 1919. He lives in Freyburg. Wilhelm's stepmother is said to have died on 4 April 1955, in a state of psychological confusion.

== Service history ==
In November 1932, he joined the Hitler Youth (Hitler Jugend) and in April of the following year, the Nazi Party.

In 1933 he joined the SS and worked as an SS Clerk and then by 1936, was made an Unterscharführer

In 1939, he was promoted to Oberschaführer and sent to Opeln and Krakau as part of a Sipo contingent under the command of Obersturmbannführer Otto Sens

December 1939, he was commissioned Untersturmführer and sent to the SD Academy

June 1941, Rosenbaum was ordered to join Karl Eberhard Schöngarth's Einsatzkommando

In August 1943, he was transferred to Salzburg where he remained until April 1945 as the Russian troops were advancing on the city

== After World War II ==
Rosenbaum worked on a farm as a transport manager in the eastern Zone, but after a few months moved to Hamburg where he was worked various jobs such as an Insurance Agent, Private Detective and a Traveling Salesman. In 1949, he purchased a sweet shop in Hamburg, and then moved into the Wholesale Confectionery business where he had annual sales of approximately 1.3 million DM.

== War Crimes ==
In 1961, Rosenbaum was arrested as a suspected war criminal. In 1968, he was found guilty of ordering mass executions of 159 Jews in the Cracow district and of having himself shot at least 10 persons, including children. The prosecution alleged that Rosenbaum ordered the shootings and hangings of Jews as his own "private affair" and not on the orders of superiors. Rosenbaum was sentenced to life in prison, but released in 1982 due to chronic rheumatic disease. He died in 1984.
