= Czarny Las massacre =

- Part of the genocide of Poles by the Nazis
- Date: 14-15 August 1941
- Type: Mass murder
- Motive: Nazi racist policy, Anti-slavism, Anti-polonism
- Perpetrator: Gestapo
- Deaths: 250–300 ethnic Poles

Czarny Las massacre (Polish: Mord w Czarnym Lesie, English: Black Forest Massacre, Ukrainian: Різанина в Чорному Лісі) was a mass murder of around 250–300 ethnic Poles and Jews during World War II, carried out by the Gestapo on the orders of SS-Hauptsturmführer Hans Krueger (also spelled Krüger) in Czarny Las (Black Forest) near Stanisławów, the night of 14-15 August 1941.

== Background ==
Prior to World War II, Stanisławów (now Ivano-Frankivsk, Ukraine) was the seat of the Stanisławów Voivodeship in the Second Polish Republic. After the 1939 Invasion of Poland, the territory was annexed to the Soviet Union. In the German invasion of the Soviet Union of 1941, the city was captured by the Hungarian contingent of the Wehrmacht friendlier towards the local Polish people. They put an end to pogroms of local Jews, carried out by groups of Ukrainian nationalists. In early August 1941 the Hungarians were replaced by the Germans, who with help from Ukrainian nationalists, began preparation for the mass murder of Polish intelligentsia, under SS-Hauptsturmführer Hans Krüger, who had already participated in the Massacre of Lviv professors.

== Massacre ==
Upon the order of Gestapo Chief Hans Krueger, during the night of August 8/9 1941, Ukrainian auxiliary police arrested members of Polish intelligentsia, mostly teachers. Some were arrested for teaching communist ideas; a list of those arrested had been partially prepared by, among others, a professor of the Ukrainian high school, Ivan Rybczyn. The Poles were told that they were asked to come for an organizational meeting, due to the oncoming school year. Since the policemen acted in a polite way, future victims did not suspect anything wrong. On that night, some 250 people were arrested. All were kept in a Gestapo prison, and at first their families were allowed to meet them. During the night of 14-15 August. Poles were ordered to load on trucks, and some 250 of them were taken to Czarny Las (Black Forest), near the village of Pawełcze, where they were shot. Before the execution, the Germans had ordered a group of peasants from Pawełcze to dig mass graves. One person survived the massacre, a Polish forester from the village of Sołotwina, who, taking advantage of rain and night, managed to escape from a truck. Among those murdered were teachers, doctors, priests and civil servants.

The fate of those murdered was not known to their families, who in September 1941 sent a delegation to the local Gestapo. Hans Kruger assured them that all were alive, and the investigation was still going on. The Germans allowed families to send food parcels and clothes to their loved ones. The food was given to dogs, and the clothes were taken by wards of Gestapo prison. In the winter of 1942, Countess Karolina Lanckorońska went to Stanisławów as an envoy of Central Welfare Council. She talked to Krueger and German prosecutor Rotter. In a conversation with Rotter, he suggested to her that Krueger had killed the Stanisławów intelligentsia.

Among those murdered were a number of high school teachers, such as Leon Buchowski, Maksymilian Fleszer, Henryka Halpern, Jan Kuźmycz, Kajetan Isakiewicz (a relative of Rev. Tadeusz Isakowicz-Zaleski), Aleksander Jordan (father of Maria Jordan, biologist of the Polish Academy of Sciences), Antoni Karsznia, Franciszek Jun, Kazimierz Waligóra, Rev. Łucjan Tokarski, Stanisław Umański, Maksymilian Chudnio, Witold Dąbrowski, Kazimierz Firganek, Wawrzyniec Jakubiec, Władysław Łuczyński, Józef Majgier, Alojzy Rotter, Anatol Scherman, Ignacy Stamper, Stanisław Telichowski, Roman Jacyk, Radosław Jawecki, Maksymilian Rosenberg, Joanna Kopytowa, Stanisława Antoszewska, Zygmunt Kamiński, Emil Planer, Kazimiera Skwarczyńska, Stanisław Szczepanowski, Władysław Begier, Włodzimierz Kamiński, Franciszek Sawicki, Aleksander Ilczyszyn, Marian Stefanów, Stanisława Czaprażanka, Władysława Rozozińska, Kamila Szczepanowska, Józef Drozd, Marcin Folger, Marian Płaczek, Jadwiga Robinowa, Irena Moldauer, Józef Kujbida.

== Post-war ==
Mass graves were discovered in Czarny Las in 1988, due to the efforts of families of victims, and with help from local people. In 1991, Council for the Protection of Struggle and Martyrdom Sites erected a monument there. In August 2011 a commemorative cross was placed in Czarny Las, during a ceremony attended by the governor of Ivano-Frankivsk Oblast, Mykhailo Vyshyvaniuk, Andrzej Kunert of Council for the Protection of Struggle and Martyrdom Sites, and families of victims. During the ceremony, Kunert said: "It was not only a brutal attack of the Germans on Polish intelligentsia, regarded by them as main enemy, as the most dangerous part of the nation. It also was part of a broader plan of both occupiers".

== See also ==
- Massacre of Lviv professors
- Intelligenzaktion
- Sonderaktion Krakau
- German AB-Aktion in Poland

== Notes and references ==
- Tadeusz Kamiński, Tajemnica Czarnego Lasu, Kraków, 2001.
- Karolina Lanckorońska, Wspomnienia wojenne, Kraków 2007, ISBN 978-83-240-0907-7
- Tadeusz Olszański, Kresy Kresów. Stanisławów, Warszawa 2008, ISBN 978-83-244-0077-5
