= Hans Krueger =

German Gestapo officer (1909–1988)

- Born: 1 July 1909; Posen, German Empire
- Died: 8 February 1988 (aged 78); Wartenberg, Bavaria, West Germany
- Military career
- Allegiance: Nazi Germany
- Branch: Schutzstaffel
- Rank: SS-Hauptsturmführer
- Unit: Gestapo

Hans Krueger (also spelled Krüger, Kreger) (1 July 1909 – 8 February 1988) was a German captain of the Gestapo in occupied Poland during World War II, involved in organizing the string of massacres after the commencement of Operation Barbarossa behind the Curzon Line. His murderous rampage in the General Government territory against the ethnic Poles and the Polish Jews began with the massacre of Lwów professors in July 1941, which was followed by the Czarny Las massacre near Stanisławów (now Ivano-Frankivsk, Ukraine) in August 1941, as well as the notorious Bloody Sunday massacre of 10,000–12,000 Jews: men, women and children in October 1941, leading to the liquidation of the Stanisławów Ghetto a year later. Krueger (also spelled Kreger, Krüger) was known as the right man for the job due to his Nazi fanaticism which earned him the seat of a city commandant in 1941 but also his brutality exhibited through hands-on participation in the killings.

== Pre-war SS career ==
Krueger was born in Posen (now Poznań), then part of Prussia within the German Empire. Together with his parents, he fled back to Germany or was expelled from the Second Polish Republic in 1918 (after the Treaty of Versailles), and ever since held a deep-seated hatred for Polish people. He joined the SA Storm Division in 1929 at the age of twenty. Although his training was in agriculture Krueger rose rapidly in the SA ranks thanks to his dedication to Nazism. After the Nazi rise to power in January 1933, Krueger was appointed head of the Oranienburg concentration camp political division and distinguished himself by his ruthlessness. As a member of the SA he was made section head of the labour office in the camp after the Night of the Long Knives in June 1934.

Krueger joined the Gestapo in 1939 after the invasion of Poland and soon relocated to Kraków in the semi-colonial General Government. His long Nazi past helped him acquire a position with the Kommandateur der Sicherheitspolizei und des SD (KdS) as the director of the SiPo-SD School in the resort town of Zakopane, where the Polish Tatra Confederation members were tortured. He trained Ukrainian collaborators from Galicia, as future SiPo-SD personnel. Krueger's subsequent advancement came with the German invasion of the Soviet Union of 22 June 1941, when he joined the Sonderkommando z.b.V. (for special assignments) as deputy to Karl Eberhard Schöngarth. Soon after, he took part in the occupation of Lvov and on 12 October 1941 commanded the same men he trained in the Bloody Sunday massacre of Jews at Stanislau.

Hans Krueger (sometimes spelled Krüger) is not to be confused with Hans Krüger (1902–1971), an SS judge in occupied western Poland, even though their wartime activities and postwar careers were in many ways similar. The judge Krüger was "the terror of the Konitz prison" (Chojnice) issuing death sentences for the smallest (real or imagined) offenses. The Gestapo Krueger's operations in the south would be defined as crimes against humanity under international law.

== Murder operations during World War II ==
Krueger became a member of the Einsatzkommando killing squad on 29 June 1941, a week after the start of Operation Barbarossa, the invasion of the Soviet Union. His SS unit, composed of 150 men, was formed by Karl Schöngarth, head of the Security Police in occupied Kraków. Krueger was one of the highest-ranking functionaries among them. He arrived at Lemberg (Lviv) on 2 July 1941 with his motorized detachment, welcomed by the Ukrainian guides and interpreters from the Organization of Ukrainian Nationalists (OUN) who prepared the list of prominent targets for them. Two days later, Schöngarth and Krueger murdered forty university professors at the secluded Wzgórza Wuleckie hills.

The killings continued. Appointed Chief of the local Gestapo Office in Stanisławów, Krueger organized the execution of six hundred intellectuals on 2 August 1941 only one day after his arrival there. The same grave site in the forest called Czarny Las near Pawełcze village (Pawelce), was used on 15 August in the Black Forest (Czarny Las) massacre of 200–300 prisoners, mostly teachers, civil servants and professors transported out of Gestapo jail in covered lorries by SiPo. On 6 October 1941 in nearby Nadworna some 2,000 Jews: men, women and children were murdered on Krueger's orders, marking the beginning of the Final Solution in the General Government months before the Wannsee Conference near Berlin put it in motion in 1942. One week later, on 12 October 1941 with the aid of the Orpo Reserve Police Battalion 133 from Lemberg and the Ukrainian Auxiliary Police, Krueger organized the Bloody Sunday massacre of 10,000–12,000 Jews in Stanisławów, where most of the remaining Jewish population of the city was brought into a Jewish cemetery and shot continuously until after dark. Krueger took part in the killings. "Over the span of sixteen months (wrote historian Dieter Pohl), this small police station – its staff at times numbering only twenty-five – organized and implemented the shooting of some 70,000 Jews and the deportation of another 12,000 to death camps. Acts of such monstrous proportions are generally associated only with the large SS killing squads." The atrocities committed on his orders constituted the beginning of the Holocaust by bullet on the Eastern Front.

== Postwar career ==
Krueger was picked up in the Netherlands at the end of World War II and held in custody, but lied about his past and was released by the Dutch in November 1948 for lack of evidence. He settled in West Germany and made a living as a traveling salesman before starting his own firm. He claimed to be an antifascist, and entered politics. At this point, the two careers of Hauptsturmführer Krueger (or Krüger) from Gestapo born in 1909, and Oberamtsrichter Hans Krüger of the CDU born in 1902, began to overlap.

In the 1950s, Krueger requested a civil servant position. His application was turned down by the German internal security agency. He began a career in party politics, and served as managing director of the FVP Party for the Muenster district. In 1949–56, he was a chairman of the Association of Germans from Berlin and Brandenburg. Krueger ran in the North Rhine-Westphalia State Assembly elections for the League of Eastern Expellees.

== Trial and conviction ==
Due in part to Krueger's life in the public eye, he was questioned by the authorities. In 1962, Krueger was rearrested. In October 1965 a formal indictment against Krueger was issued by the Dortmund State Prosecutor's Office. In 1967 he was put on trial. Krueger admitted that he served as the Gestapo Chief in Stanisławów, assuming incorrectly that no Jewish victims were left alive to confront him, until the Polish Countess Karolina Lanckorońska, who had been tortured by the Gestapo at his headquarters but spared execution thanks to family ransom, appeared at his trial. Krueger's trial lasted for two years during which he sparked outrage for his anti-Semitic outbursts. Another witness against him was William Tannenzapf, one of an estimated 1,500 Jews from Stanisławów who had initially survived the war.

Krueger was found guilty of multiple crimes and sentenced to life in prison. Krueger was never tried for the massacre of Lwów professors, which took place elsewhere. Poland's official request for a separate trial was denied by the German prosecution on the grounds that Krueger had already received a life sentence and no extension was possible. He was released from prison in 1986 and died two years later, aged 78.
