= Villa Atma =

Coordinates: 49°17′32.4″N 19°56′54.4″E

Karol Szymanowski Museum in Villa Atma

- Established: 1976
- Location: Zakopane, Poland
- Type: National museum
- Curator: Agnieszka Gasienica-Giewont
- Website: Karol Szymanowski Museum in Villa Atma

The Villa Atma (Polish Willa Atma) in Zakopane, Poland, is a historic chalet housing the Karol Szymanowski Museum, department of the National Museum in Kraków.

== History ==
It was built in the late 19th century as a guest house in a popular Zakopane Style and expanded in 1926 to include seven rooms. The name 'Atma' (added in the 1920s), is derived from the Sanskrit word for 'soul'. The house was rented by Szymanowski for six years between 1930 and 1936 as his main residence before his death in 1937. It was purchased through a fundraising campaign led by writer Jerzy Waldorff in Communist Poland, and has opened its doors as a museum on March 6, 1976.

== Museum ==
The composer Szymanowski visited Zakopane in his childhood. The Villa Atma became his permanent residence when he was diagnosed with tuberculosis and left his position of Director at the Warsaw Conservatory in 1930. He described the villa in a letter to his mother as "a small, humble mountaineer's cottage". Amongst the fellow artists who visited Szymanowski in Villa Atma were Artur Rubinstein, Serge Lifar and Emil Młynarski.

After Szymanowski's death in 1937, his friends suggested making the Villa a museum in his honour, but this aim was not achieved until 1976 when the house was purchased by the "Atma" Committee and donated to the National Museum of Poland. The exhibits include a close recreation of the composer's study, in which he wrote some of his most notable works including the Symphony No. 4, (a sinfonia concertante for piano and orchestra dedicated to Rubinstein), and his second Violin Concerto. The exhibit is decorated with his portrait painted by Young Poland's leading painter and art theoretician Stanisław Witkiewicz.

The museum is located in Zakopane at ul. Kasprusie 19, and is open Wednesday through Sunday. Apart from the ground-floor permanent collection, there is a second-floor library and archive relating to Szymanowski. Occasionally concerts and recitals are held in the Villa.

== See also ==
- List of music museums
- List of compositions by Karol Szymanowski categorized by genre, dates and titles.
