= Muzeum Narodowe =

Muzeum Narodowe is the Polish language name of a number of museums in Poland, meaning National Museum. It may refer to:

- National Museum of Poland
- National Museum, Gdańsk
- National Museum, Kraków
- National Museum, Poznań
- National Museum, Szczecin
- National Museum, Warsaw
- National Museum, Wrocław
