= National Museum of Poland =

"National Museum of Poland" is the overarching name for several of the country's largest and most notable museums, each receiving government funding and operating a number of regional museum branches.

== Poland's national museums include ==
- National Museum, Kraków
1. Main Building
2. Czartoryski Museum
3. Sukiennice
4. Jan Matejko Manor
5. Stanisław Wyspiański Museum
6. Józef Mehoffer House
7. Szołayski Family house
8. Emeryk Hutten-Czapski Museum and Palace
9. Villa Atma, Zakopane Karol Szymanowski Museum
10. Bishop Erazm Ciołek'st Palace
11. Library of the Czartoryski Princes
12. Former Cracovia Hotel
- National Museum, Warsaw
1. Poster Museum at Wilanów
2. Królikarnia, Xawery Dunikowski Museum of Sculpture
3. Nieborów and Arkadia Museums
4. Otwock Museum of Design
5. Łowicz Regional Museum
6. Museum of Jerzy Dunin-Borkowski in Krośniewice
7. Łazienki Museum of Ignacy Jan Paderewski and the Polish Emigration to America
- National Museum, Gdańsk
1. Gdańsk–Oliwa Ethnographical Museum
2. Gdańsk-Oliwa Museum of Modern Art
3. Będomin Museum of the National Anthem
- National Maritime Museum, Gdańsk
- National Museum, Kielce at the Palace of the Kraków Bishops
- National Museum, Poznań
- National Museum, Szczecin
1. The Museum of the History of the City of Szczecin
2. The Maritime Museum
3. Szczecin Gallery of Contemporary Art
- National Museum, Wrocław
1. Ethnographical Museum
2. The Racławice Panorama Museum
3. Lubiąż Museal Depot
- National Museum, Lublin

Among the many Museums of Poland around the world, there is also the Polish Museum of America in Chicago, the Polish American Museum in New York City and the Polish National Museum in Rapperswil, Switzerland.
