= Symphony No. 4 (Szymanowski) =

1932 symphony by Karol Szymanowski

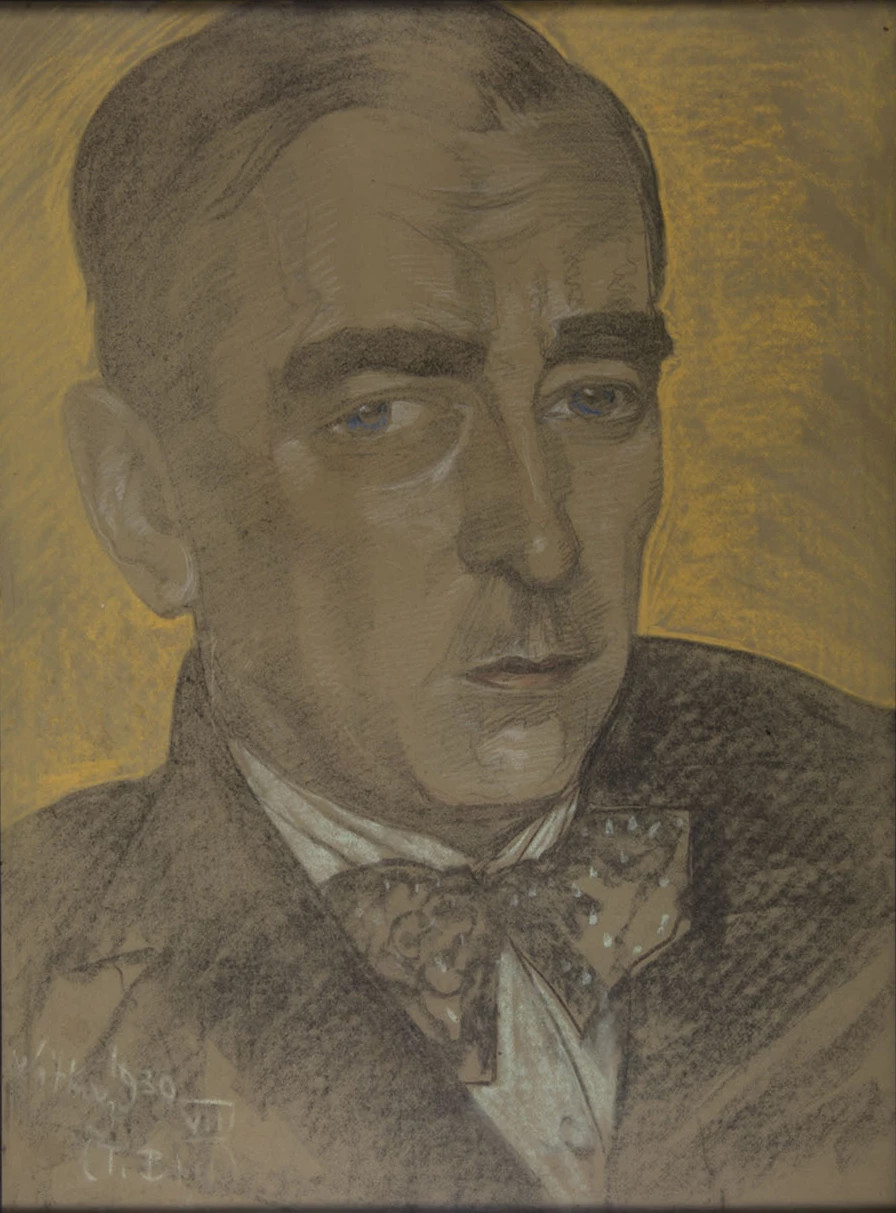
Portrait of Karol Szymanowski, 1930

The Symphony No. 4 (Symphonie concertante), Op. 60 is a work for solo piano and orchestra written by the Polish composer Karol Szymanowski between March and June 1932. It is dedicated to the pianist Arthur Rubinstein. Szymanowski himself played the piano part at the premiere performance on 9 October 1932, with Grzegorz Fitelberg conducting the Poznań City Orchestra.

The symphony is cast in three movements:

1. Moderato. Tempo comodo
2. Andante molto sostenuto
3. Allegro non troppo, agitato ed ansioso

The symphony is scored for solo piano, 2 flutes (2nd doubling piccolo), 2 oboes (2nd doubling cor anglais), 2 clarinets (2nd doubling E flat clarinet), 2 bassoons (2nd doubling contrabassoon), 4 horns, 3 trumpets, 3 trombones, tuba, percussion (4 players), harp and strings.

A typical performance lasts approximately 25 minutes.

Roman Berger's 1983 sonata for violin and piano is subtitled "with the Motif by K. Szymanowski". It includes a lengthy quotation of the symphony's opening piano theme, played by the violin midway through the first movement, in a pppp section marked subito meno messo e rubato misterioso.

== Selected recordings ==
- Piotr Paleczny, piano; BBC Symphony Orchestra; Mark Elder, conductor (BBC Radio Classics, 1995)
- Howard Shelley, piano); BBC Philharmonic Orchestra; Vassily Sinaisky, conductor (Chandos Records, 1996)
- Louis Lortie, piano; BBC Symphony Orchestra; Edward Gardner, conductor (Chandos Records, 2013)
- Leif Ove Andsnes, piano; City of Birmingham Symphony Orchestra; Simon Rattle, conductor (EMI Classics, 1999 / Warner Classics, 2015)
- Denis Matsuev, piano; London Symphony Orchestra; Valery Gergiev, conductor (LSO Live, 2013 / Alto, 2018)
- Tadeusz Zmudzinski, piano; Polish State Philharmonic Orchestra (Katowice); Karol Stryja, conductor (Marco Polo, 2000 / Naxos Records)
- Jan Krzysztof Broja, piano; Warsaw National Philharmonic Orchestra; Antoni Wit, conductor (Naxos Records, 2009)
