= Zakopane =

Town in Lesser Poland Voivodeship, Poland

Zakopane Zokopane
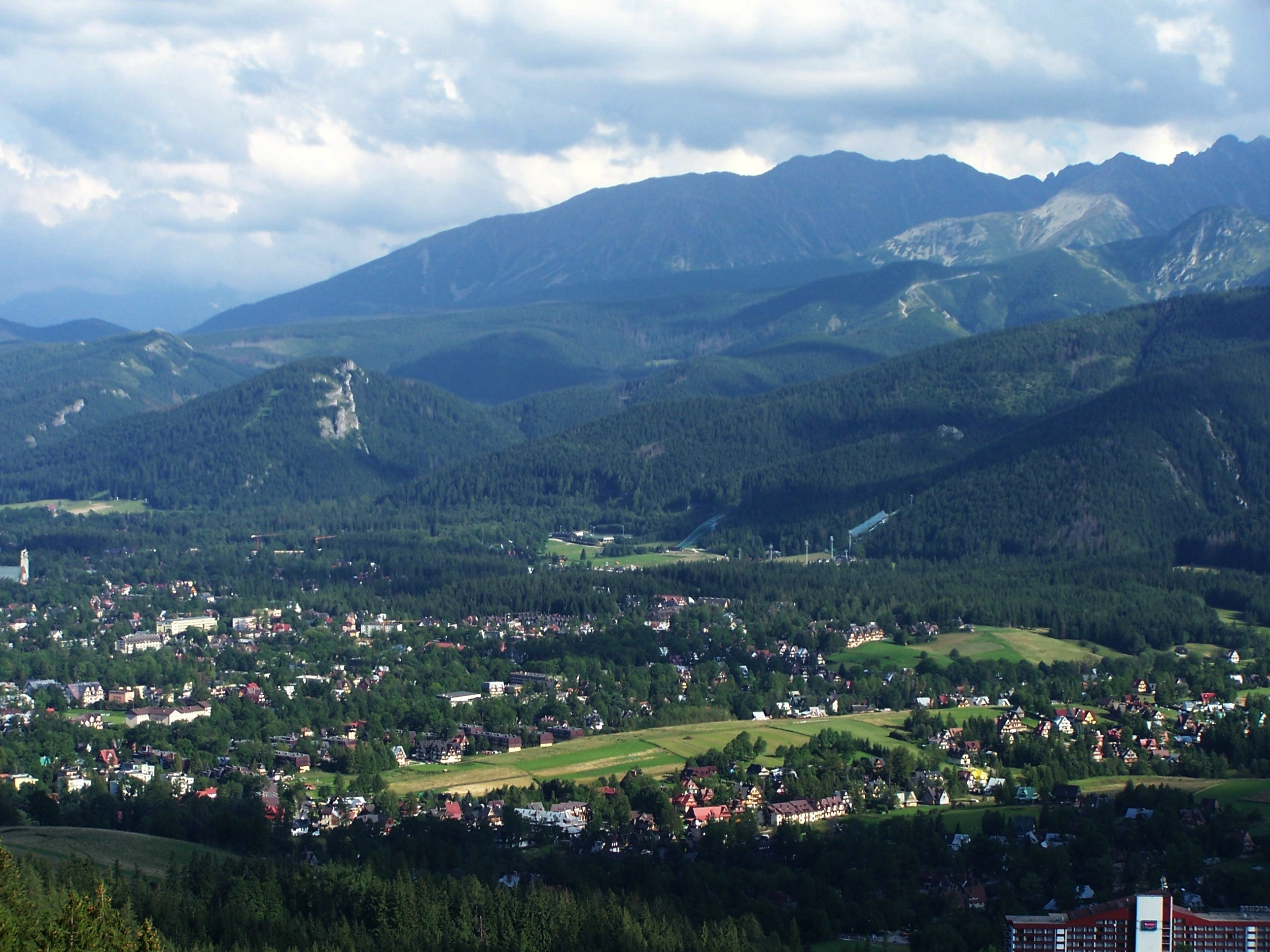
- View of Zakopane from Butorowy Wierch

- Flag Coat of arms
- Interactive map of Zakopane
- Location within Poland
- Coordinates: 49°18′N 19°57′E
- Country: Poland
- Voivodeship: Lesser Poland
- County: Tatra
- Gmina: Zakopane (urban gmina)
- Established: 17th century
- Town rights: 1933

Government
  - Mayor: Łukasz Filipowicz

Area
  - Total: 84 km^{2} (32 sq mi)
- Highest elevation: 2,301 m (7,549 ft)
- Lowest elevation: 750 m (2,460 ft)

Population (2017)
  - Total: 27,266
  - Density: 320/km^{2} (840/sq mi)
- Demonym(s): zakopianin (male) zakopianka (female) (pl)
- Time zone: UTC+1 (CET)
  - Summer (DST): UTC+2 (CEST)
- Postal code: 34-500 to 34-504
- Area code: +48 18
- Car plates: KTT
- Website: www.zakopane.pl

Zakopane (Podhale dialect: Zokopane) is a town in the south of Poland, in the southern part of the Podhale region at the foot of the Tatra Mountains. From 1975 to 1998, it was part of Nowy Sącz Voivodeship; since 1999, it has been part of Lesser Poland Voivodeship. As of 2017, its population was 27,266. Zakopane is a centre of Goral culture and is often referred to as "the winter capital of Poland". It is a popular tourist destination for many types of mountain and winter activities such as skiing, trekking, mountaineering and various forms of climbing.

Zakopane lies near Poland's border with Slovakia, in a valley between the Tatra Mountains and Gubałówka Hill. It is connected by rail and road to the provincial capital, Kraków. Zakopane lies 800–1,100 metres (2,600–3,600 ft) above sea level and centres on the intersection of its Krupówki and Kościuszko Streets.

== History ==
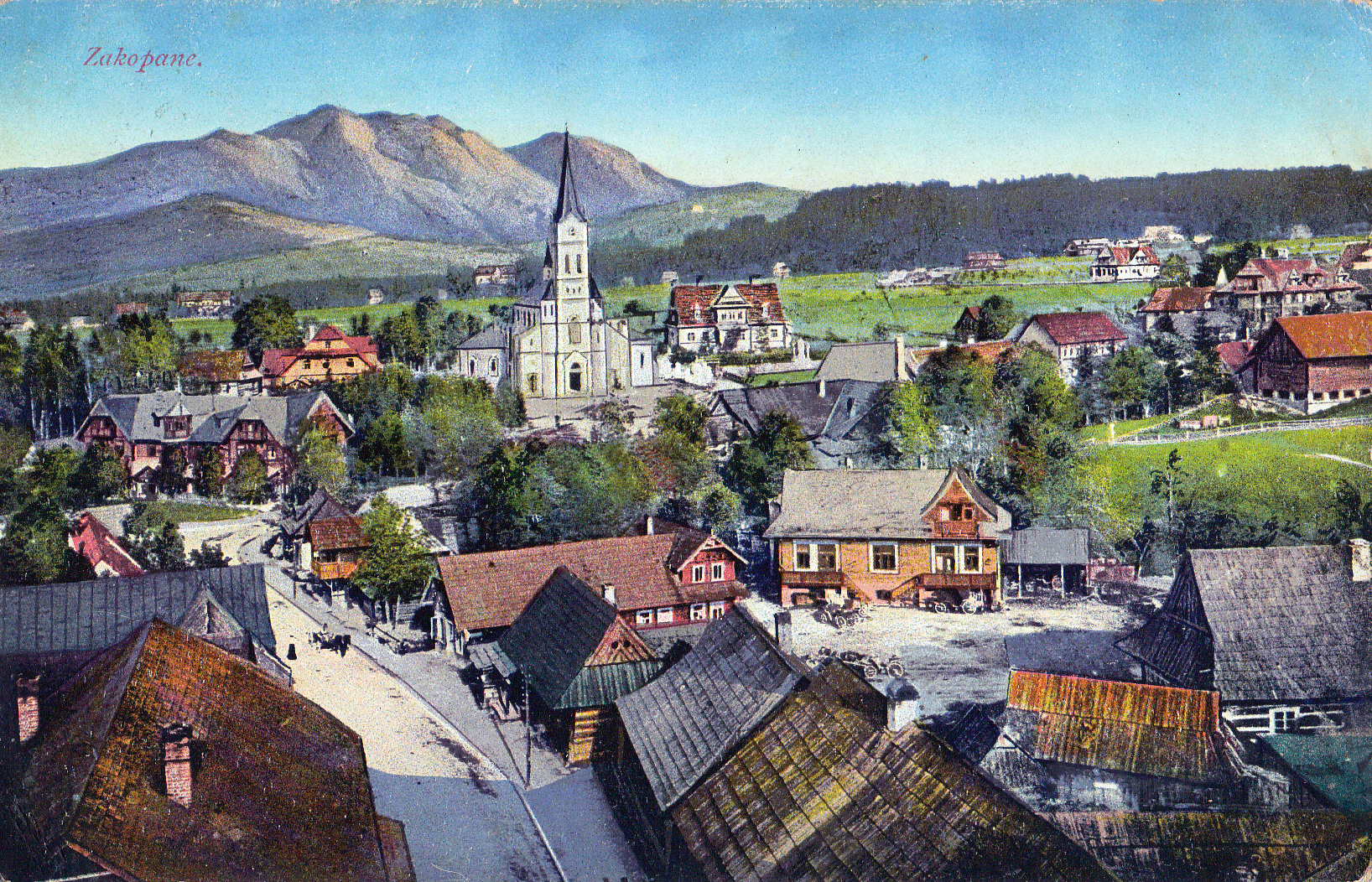
A postcard of Zakopane from 1916

The earliest documents mentioning Zakopane date to the 17th century, describing a glade called Zakopisko. In 1676, it was a village of 43 inhabitants. In 1818, Zakopane was a small town that was still being developed. There were only 340 homes that held 445 families. The population of Zakopane at that time was 1,805: 934 women and 871 men. The first church was built in 1847, by Józef Stolarczyk.

Zakopane became a center for the region's mining and metallurgy industries; by the 19th century, it was the largest center for metallurgy in the region of Galicia. It expanded during the 19th century as the climate attracted more inhabitants. By 1889, it had developed from a small village into a climatic health resort. Rail services to Zakopane began on 1 October 1899. In the late 1800s, Zakopane constructed a road that went to the town of Nowy Targ and had railways that came from Chabówka. Because of easier transportation, the population of Zakopane had increased to about 3,000 people by the end of the 1800s. In the 19th century, Krupówki Street was just a narrow beaten path that was meant for people to get from the central part of town to the village of Kuźnice.

The ski jump on Wielka Krokiew was opened in 1925. The cable car to Kasprowy Wierch was completed in 1936. The funicular connected Zakopane and the top of Gubałówka in 1938.

Because of Zakopane's popular ski mountains, the town gained popularity which made the number of tourists increase to about 60,000 people by 1930.

=== World War II ===
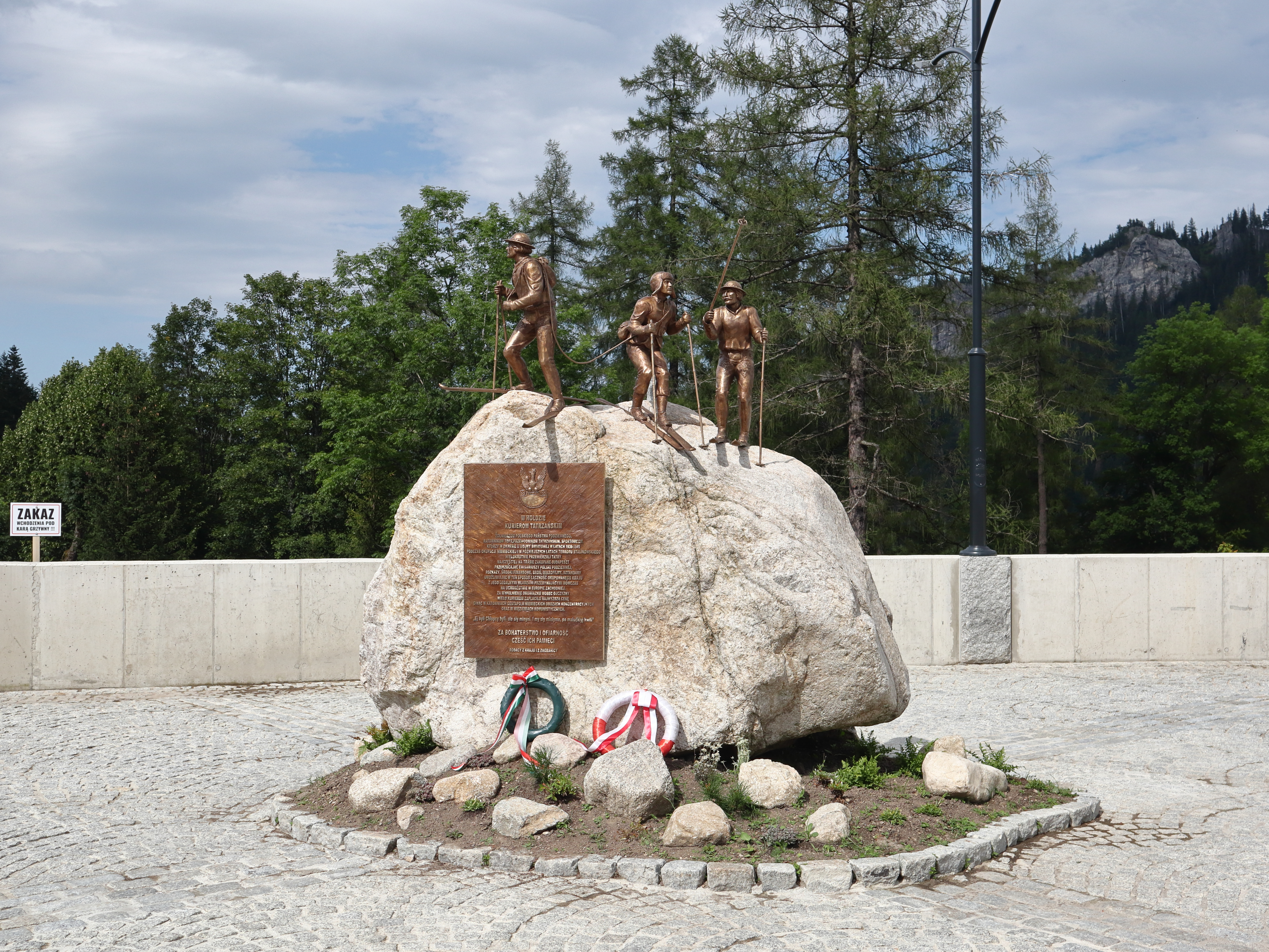
Monument to the Tatra Couriers

During the joint German-Soviet invasion of Poland, which started World War II in September 1939, the town was invaded by Germany, and the Einsatzgruppe I entered the town on 4 September 1939 to commit various crimes against Poles. In March 1940, representatives of the Soviet NKVD and the Nazi Gestapo met for one week in Zakopane's Villa Tadeusz, to coordinate the pacification of resistance in Poland. The pre-war mayor Zdzisław Adamczyk and several other people from Zakopane were murdered by the Soviets in the Katyn massacre in 1940. The Germans established a prison camp for Polish people in Zakopane, which also served to exterminate the Polish population similarly to the notorious prisons and camps in Kraków, Poznań, Łódź, Warsaw, and Działdowo.

The Polish resistance was quickly organized in Zakopane, and already on 29 November 1939, it launched an attack on a German prison. Throughout World War II, Zakopane served as an underground staging point between Poland and Hungary. The Polish resistance also organized acts of sabotage, provided aid to Jews and issued Polish underground press in Zakopane.

From 1942 to 1943, 1,000 prisoners from the German Kraków-Płaszów concentration camp were set to work in a stone quarry. In 1944, during the Warsaw Uprising, the Germans deported thousands of Varsovians from the Dulag 121 camp in Pruszków, where they were initially imprisoned, to Zakopane. Those Poles were mainly old people, ill people and women with children. In mid-October 1944, there were 3,800 registered Poles, who were expelled from Warsaw, and probably another 3,800 unregistered expellees. In January 1945, the Germans retreated from Zakopane and the German occupation ended.

Immediately after the war, a children's Home for Holocaust Survivors was established in Zakopane.

== Climate ==
Zakopane has a humid continental climate (Köppen climate classification: Dfb), with the main factor behind its relative coldness compared to the rest of Poland is its altitude. In general, the temperature tends to fall with altitude, therefore Zakopane is almost 3 °C (5.4 °F) colder than northern Kraków, which is more than 600 m (2,000 ft) lower than Zakopane. With higher altitudes, the climate gets even colder, therefore, on the top of Kasprowy Wierch (1,987 m (6,519 ft) above sea level), the climate is tundra-like (Köppen: ET). The tree line is located at about 1,500 m (4,900 ft) above sea level in the Tatra Mountains.

Winters are typically frosty but are relatively sunny for Poland - in fact, Zakopane receives among the most sun in winter in the country. Snow is normally abundant, particularly in the higher altitudes, which makes Zakopane among the most popular ski resorts in Poland. Summers are cool to warm but rarely get hot.

The defining feature of the local climate is the location on the northern slope of the Tatra Mountains. Zakopane receives significantly more precipitation than cities on the lowlands to the north of the Carpathians, and just like in the mountains in general, there might be sudden weather changes from sunny to rainy, and vice versa. Occasionally, a very warm foehn wind locally known as halny may dramatically increase the temperatures, sometimes beyond 10 °C (50 °F) in winter.

Extreme temperatures range from −34.1 °C (−29.4 °F) on 1 February 1956 up to 32.8 °C (91.0 °F) on 8 August 2013; the record cold daily maximum is −19.6 °C (−3.3 °F), set on 1 February 1956, while, conversely, the record warm daily minimum is 23.4 °C (74.1 °F) on 29 August 1992.

Climate data for Zakopane, 49°17′38″N 19°57′37″E (855 m (2,805 ft) asl, 1991–2020 normals, extremes 1951–present)
Month	Jan	Feb	Mar	Apr	May	Jun	Jul	Aug	Sep	Oct	Nov	Dec	Year
Record high °C (°F)	14.9 (58.8)	17.6 (63.7)	20.3 (68.5)	25.5 (77.9)	27.3 (81.1)	31.4 (88.5)	32.5 (90.5)	32.8 (91.0)	30.7 (87.3)	26.3 (79.3)	20.6 (69.1)	18.4 (65.1)	32.8 (91.0)
Mean maximum °C (°F)	9.9 (49.8)	11.0 (51.8)	14.3 (57.7)	20.3 (68.5)	23.7 (74.7)	27.4 (81.3)	28.5 (83.3)	28.1 (82.6)	23.9 (75.0)	20.8 (69.4)	15.7 (60.3)	10.2 (50.4)	29.6 (85.3)
Mean daily maximum °C (°F)	1.1 (34.0)	2.0 (35.6)	5.4 (41.7)	11.3 (52.3)	16.0 (60.8)	19.5 (67.1)	21.2 (70.2)	21.3 (70.3)	16.3 (61.3)	11.8 (53.2)	6.6 (43.9)	1.8 (35.2)	11.2 (52.2)
Daily mean °C (°F)	−3.3 (26.1)	−2.4 (27.7)	0.6 (33.1)	6.0 (42.8)	10.7 (51.3)	14.2 (57.6)	15.8 (60.4)	15.6 (60.1)	10.9 (51.6)	6.5 (43.7)	2.1 (35.8)	−2.3 (27.9)	6.2 (43.2)
Mean daily minimum °C (°F)	−7.0 (19.4)	−6.3 (20.7)	−3.5 (25.7)	1.2 (34.2)	5.7 (42.3)	9.3 (48.7)	10.8 (51.4)	10.5 (50.9)	6.5 (43.7)	2.3 (36.1)	−1.5 (29.3)	−5.8 (21.6)	1.9 (35.4)
Mean minimum °C (°F)	−17.6 (0.3)	−15.9 (3.4)	−12.3 (9.9)	−6.2 (20.8)	−0.9 (30.4)	3.8 (38.8)	5.4 (41.7)	4.9 (40.8)	0.5 (32.9)	−5.1 (22.8)	−10.6 (12.9)	−15.7 (3.7)	−19.9 (−3.8)
Record low °C (°F)	−29.8 (−21.6)	−34.1 (−29.4)	−23.8 (−10.8)	−12.0 (10.4)	−6.1 (21.0)	−1.6 (29.1)	0.9 (33.6)	0.2 (32.4)	−4.9 (23.2)	−10.7 (12.7)	−19.6 (−3.3)	−25.5 (−13.9)	−34.1 (−29.4)
Average precipitation mm (inches)	46.6 (1.83)	51.3 (2.02)	61.4 (2.42)	81.2 (3.20)	141.5 (5.57)	149.4 (5.88)	191.6 (7.54)	125.3 (4.93)	111.0 (4.37)	80.8 (3.18)	59.7 (2.35)	45.1 (1.78)	1,145 (45.08)
Average extreme snow depth cm (inches)	62.0 (24.4)	90.5 (35.6)	97.9 (38.5)	71.2 (28.0)	13.4 (5.3)	3.3 (1.3)	0.1 (0.0)	0.4 (0.2)	5.2 (2.0)	13.7 (5.4)	23.3 (9.2)	37.9 (14.9)	97.9 (38.5)
Average precipitation days (≥ 0.1 mm)	17.43	16.27	17.23	15.70	18.70	18.37	18.43	14.77	14.17	14.90	15.63	16.53	198.13
Average snowy days (≥ 0 cm)	29.9	28.0	30.1	25.8	6.6	1.1	0.0	0.1	2.4	10.1	16.9	28.2	179.2
Average relative humidity (%)	81.1	78.5	75.0	71.1	74.4	76.1	76.7	77.4	81.6	81.7	82.9	83.5	78.3
Mean monthly sunshine hours	69.1	81.2	118.2	162.5	179.6	178.3	197.1	193.4	128.4	113.8	75.6	55.6	1,552.8
Average ultraviolet index	2	1	2	3	3	5	5	4	3	2	2	1	3
Source 1: Institute of Meteorology and Water Management
Source 2: Meteomodel.pl (records, relative humidity 1991–2020), Weather Atlas (UV)

Climate data for Kasprowy Wierch, 49°13′57″N 19°58′55″E (1,987 m (6,519 ft) asl, 1991–2020 normals, extremes 1951–present)
Month	Jan	Feb	Mar	Apr	May	Jun	Jul	Aug	Sep	Oct	Nov	Dec	Year
Record high °C (°F)	7.2 (45.0)	9.9 (49.8)	9.4 (48.9)	14.2 (57.6)	18.7 (65.7)	22.6 (72.7)	23.4 (74.1)	22.5 (72.5)	19.8 (67.6)	16.9 (62.4)	13.9 (57.0)	8.8 (47.8)	23.4 (74.1)
Mean maximum °C (°F)	3.1 (37.6)	2.6 (36.7)	4.1 (39.4)	8.2 (46.8)	13.4 (56.1)	17.9 (64.2)	19.1 (66.4)	18.7 (65.7)	14.4 (57.9)	11.9 (53.4)	7.5 (45.5)	4.6 (40.3)	20.3 (68.5)
Mean daily maximum °C (°F)	−4.6 (23.7)	−5.0 (23.0)	−3.3 (26.1)	1.2 (34.2)	6.0 (42.8)	10.1 (50.2)	12.1 (53.8)	12.3 (54.1)	7.5 (45.5)	3.9 (39.0)	0.0 (32.0)	−3.5 (25.7)	3.1 (37.6)
Daily mean °C (°F)	−7.4 (18.7)	−7.8 (18.0)	−6.1 (21.0)	−1.6 (29.1)	3.0 (37.4)	6.7 (44.1)	8.6 (47.5)	8.9 (48.0)	4.6 (40.3)	1.2 (34.2)	−2.6 (27.3)	−6.1 (21.0)	0.1 (32.2)
Mean daily minimum °C (°F)	−10.1 (13.8)	−10.5 (13.1)	−8.7 (16.3)	−4.0 (24.8)	0.6 (33.1)	4.1 (39.4)	6.0 (42.8)	6.4 (43.5)	2.2 (36.0)	−1.3 (29.7)	−5.1 (22.8)	−8.8 (16.2)	−2.4 (27.7)
Mean minimum °C (°F)	−19.2 (−2.6)	−19.4 (−2.9)	−16.3 (2.7)	−12.5 (9.5)	−6.3 (20.7)	−2.2 (28.0)	0.0 (32.0)	0.1 (32.2)	−4.1 (24.6)	−9.8 (14.4)	−13.7 (7.3)	−17.6 (0.3)	−21.9 (−7.4)
Record low °C (°F)	−30.2 (−22.4)	−29.1 (−20.4)	−27.9 (−18.2)	−18.1 (−0.6)	−13.0 (8.6)	−7.6 (18.3)	−3.1 (26.4)	−4.5 (23.9)	−8.2 (17.2)	−15.2 (4.6)	−24.8 (−12.6)	−28.0 (−18.4)	−30.2 (−22.4)
Average precipitation mm (inches)	105.1 (4.14)	98.0 (3.86)	112.7 (4.44)	127.3 (5.01)	186.0 (7.32)	208.0 (8.19)	248.1 (9.77)	171.6 (6.76)	158.5 (6.24)	123.4 (4.86)	117.6 (4.63)	107.5 (4.23)	1,763.8 (69.44)
Average extreme snow depth cm (inches)	92.7 (36.5)	130.5 (51.4)	153.3 (60.4)	147.9 (58.2)	67.9 (26.7)	14.4 (5.7)	0.7 (0.3)	1.2 (0.5)	9.0 (3.5)	15.1 (5.9)	27.2 (10.7)	56.1 (22.1)	153.3 (60.4)
Average precipitation days (≥ 0.1 mm)	19.83	18.61	20.17	18.27	21.00	20.00	19.57	16.30	15.57	16.83	17.83	19.00	222.97
Average snowy days (≥ 0 cm)	31	28.3	30.9	30.0	20.6	3.3	0.4	0.4	5.9	13.7	21.3	30.6	216.4
Average relative humidity (%)	77.6	80.5	83.8	84.3	86.8	87.7	86.6	84.5	86.2	80.9	82.0	78.6	83.3
Mean monthly sunshine hours	88.9	91.2	117.1	154.1	157.5	153.8	166.5	179.3	130.8	121.3	83.8	80.7	1,524.8
Source 1: Institute of Meteorology and Water Management
Source 2: Meteomodel.pl (records, relative humidity 1991–2020)

See or edit raw graph data.

== Architecture ==
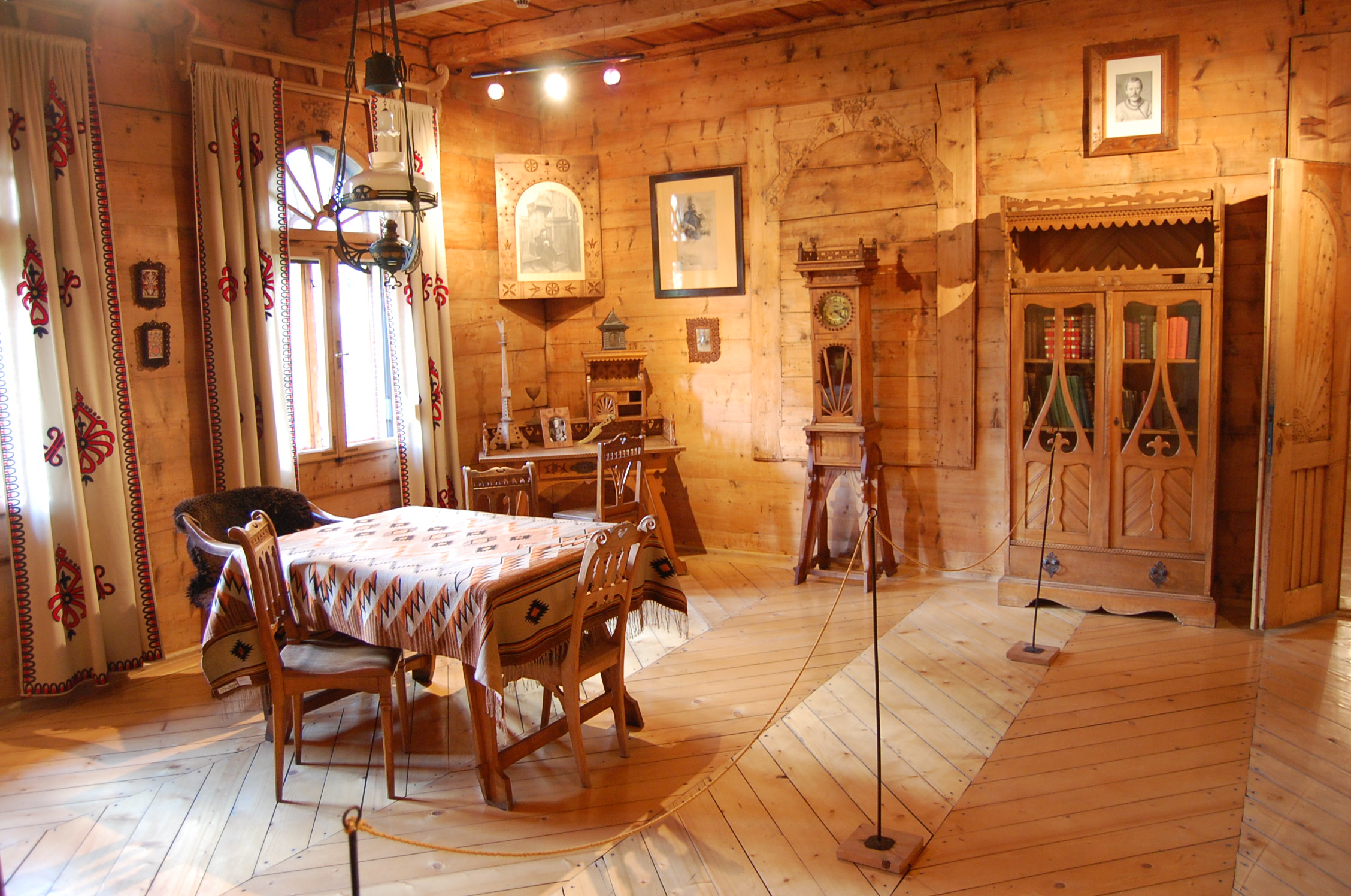
Museum of Zakopane Style at Villa Koliba - interior

The Zakopane Style of Architecture is an architectural mode inspired by the regional art of Poland's highland region known as Podhale. Drawing on the motifs and traditions in the buildings of the Carpathian Mountains, the style was pioneered by Stanisław Witkiewicz and is now considered a core tradition of the Goral people.

The most prominent examples of the style are:

- Villa Koliba - built in 1892–93 by Stanisław Witkiewicz
- Villa Oksza - built in 1894–95 by Stanisław Witkiewicz
- Villa Pod Jedlami - built in 1897 by Stanisław Witkiewicz
- Chapel in Jaszczurówka - built in 1904–07 by Stanisław Witkiewicz
- Tatra Museum - built in 1913–24 by Stanisław Witkiewicz
- Grand Hotel Stamary - built in 1903-05 by Eugeniusz Wesołowski

Other important sights in Zakopane include:

- Holy Family Church - Romanesque Revival church built in 1879–96 by Józef Pius Dziekoński
- Church of Our Lady of Częstochowa - wooden church built in 1847, located next to the Old Cemetery in Pęksowy Brzyzek
- Old Cemetery in Pęksowy Brzyzek - burial place of many artists, architects, writers, sculptors and mountaineer, among them Stanisław Witkiewicz, Kazimierz Przerwa-Tetmajer, Władysław Hasior and Sabała. There is also a cenotaph of Witkacy.
- Modernist stations of the Kasprowy Wierch cable railway (1935–36) and the Gubałówka Hill funicular (1938)
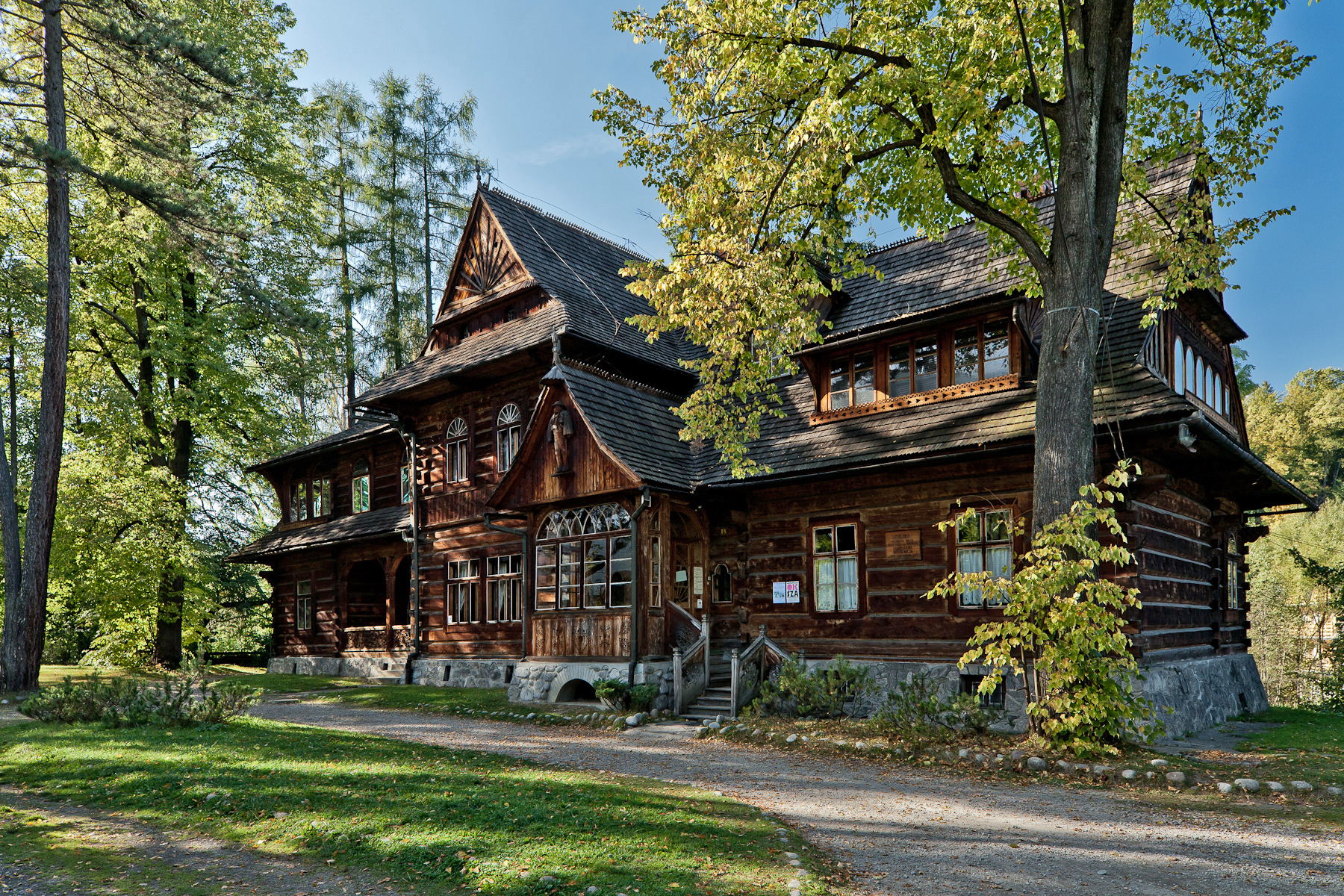
Museum of Zakopane Style at Villa Koliba

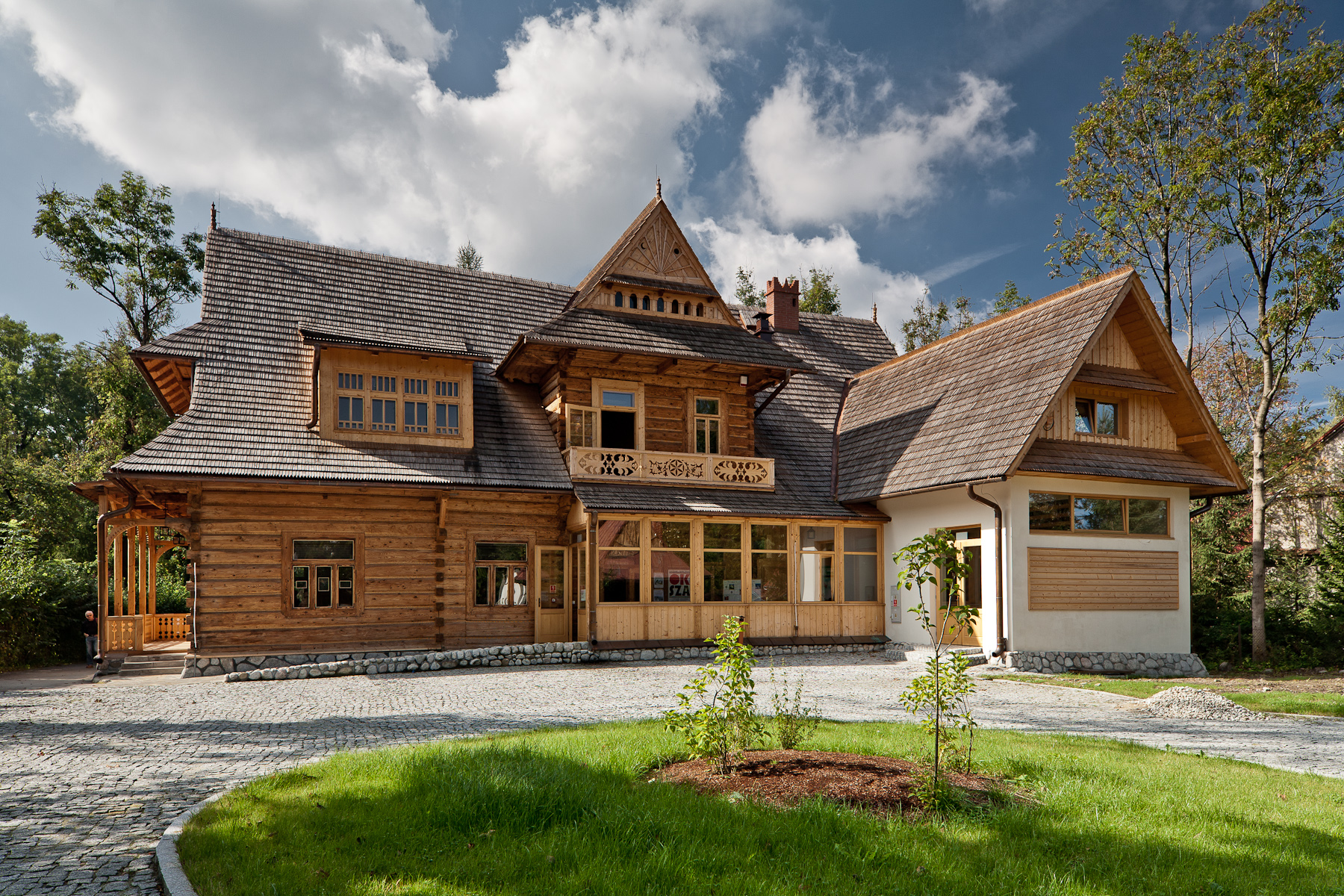
Villa Oksza art gallery

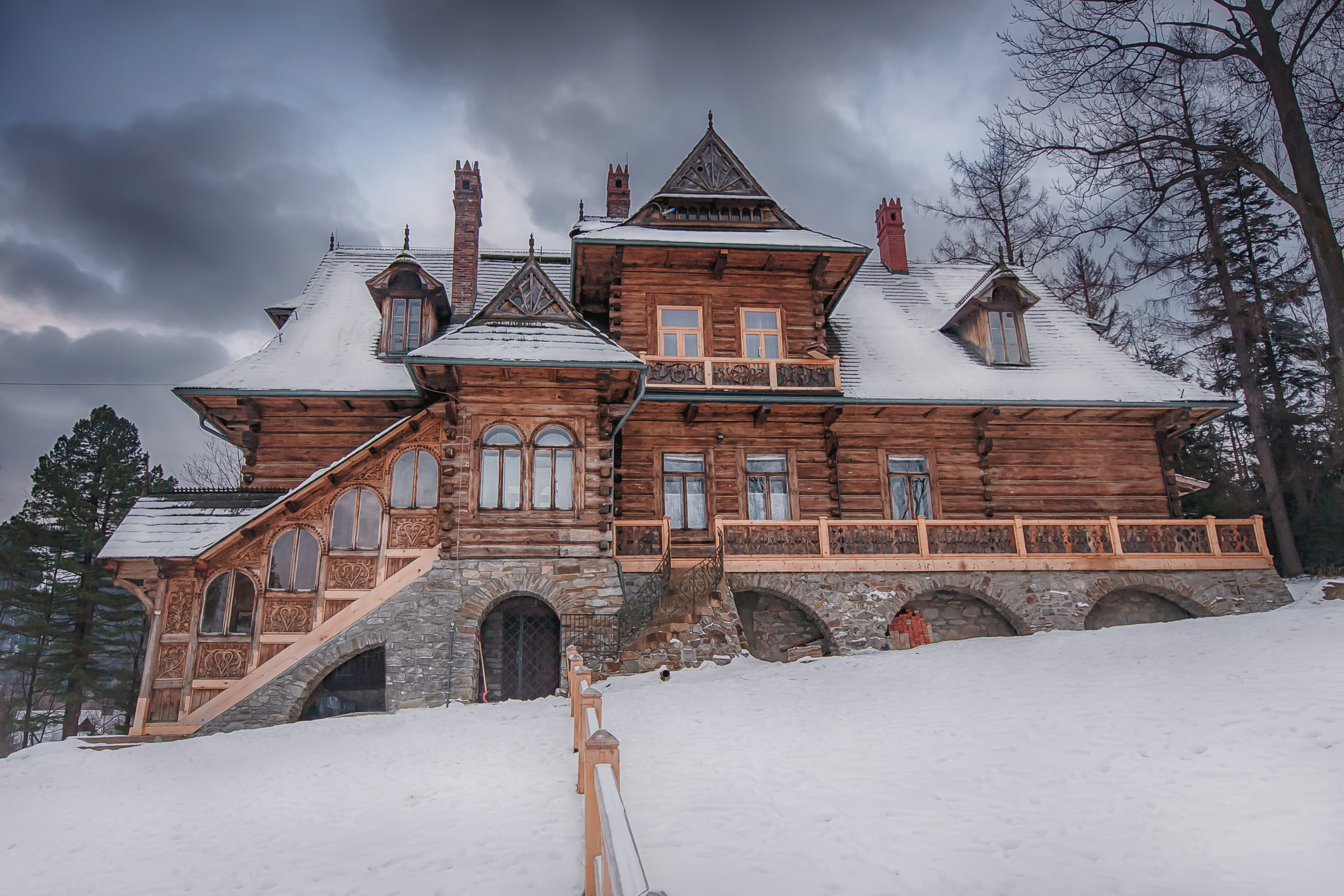
Pod Jedlami villa

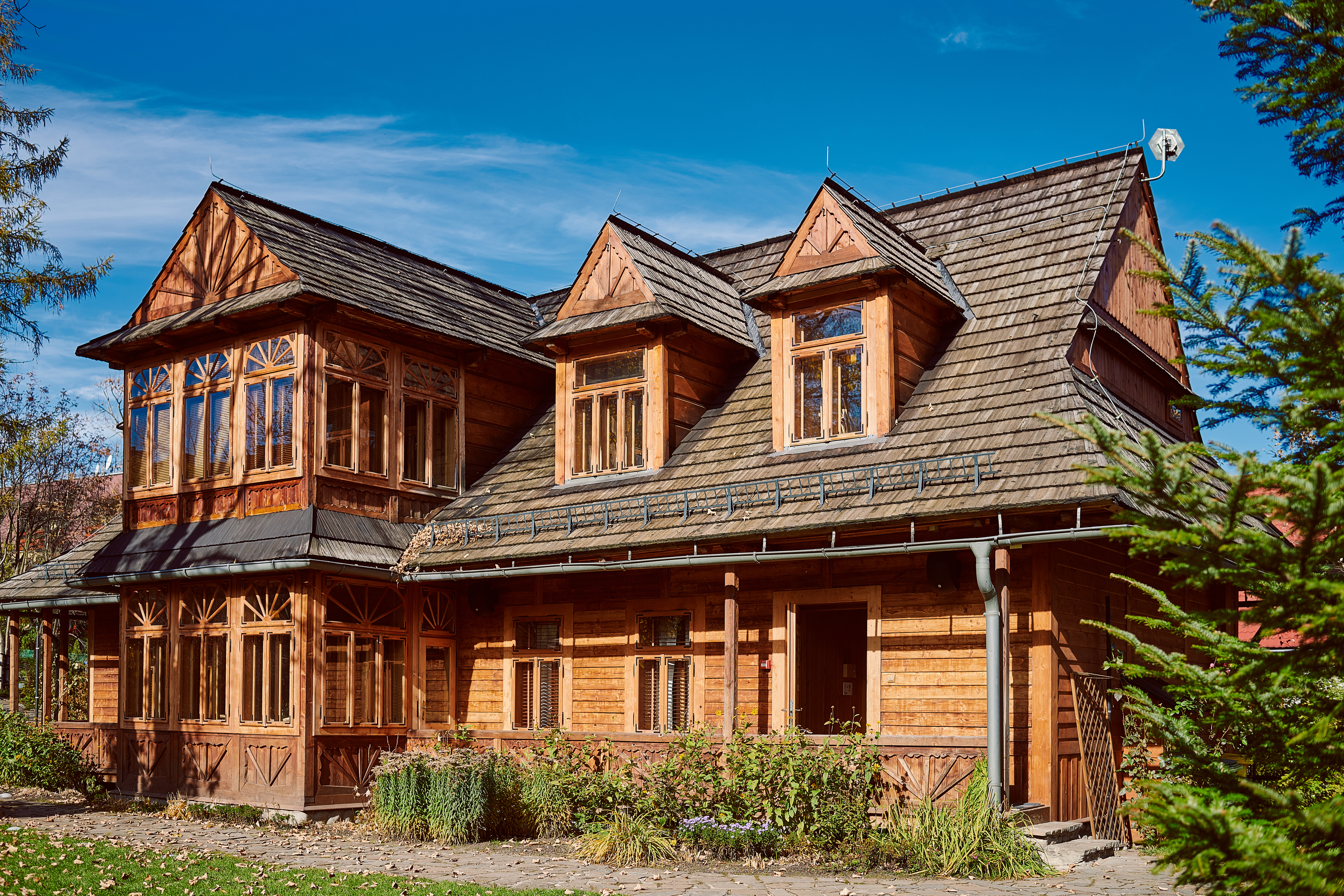
Karol Szymanowski Museum at the Villa Atma

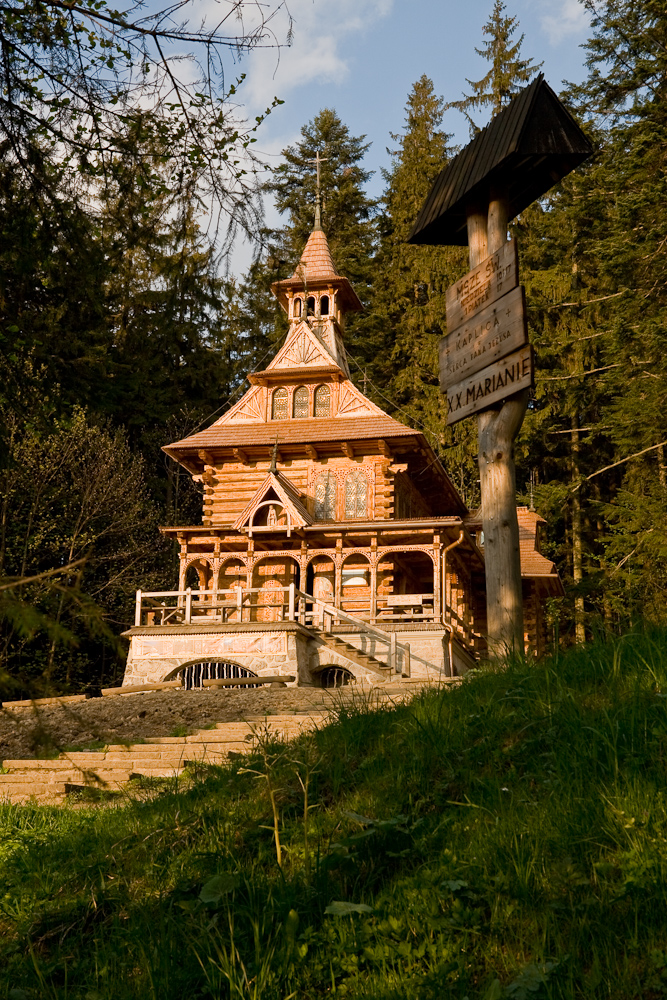
Chapel at Jaszczurówka

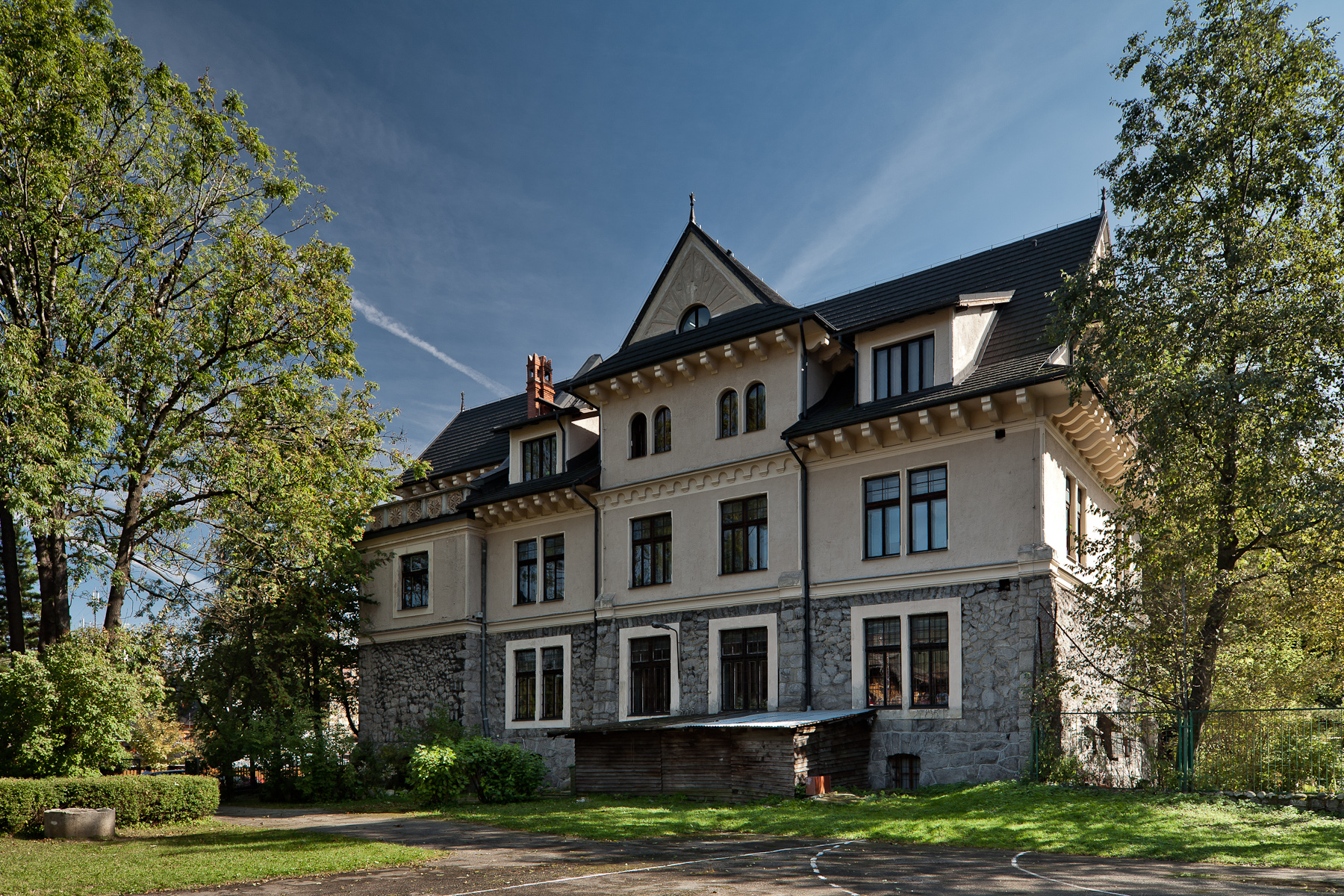
The Tatra Museum in Zakopane

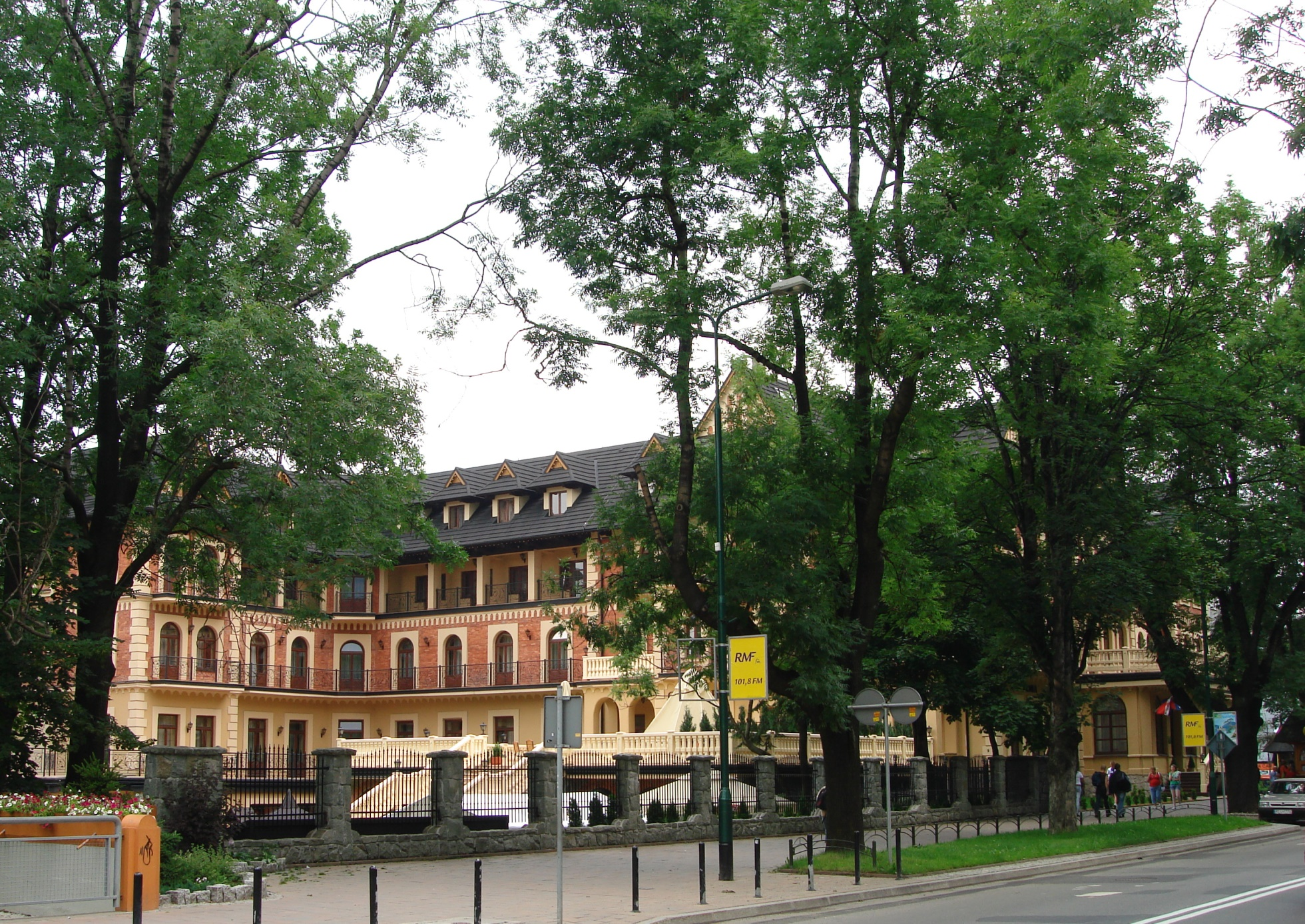
Grand Hotel Stamary

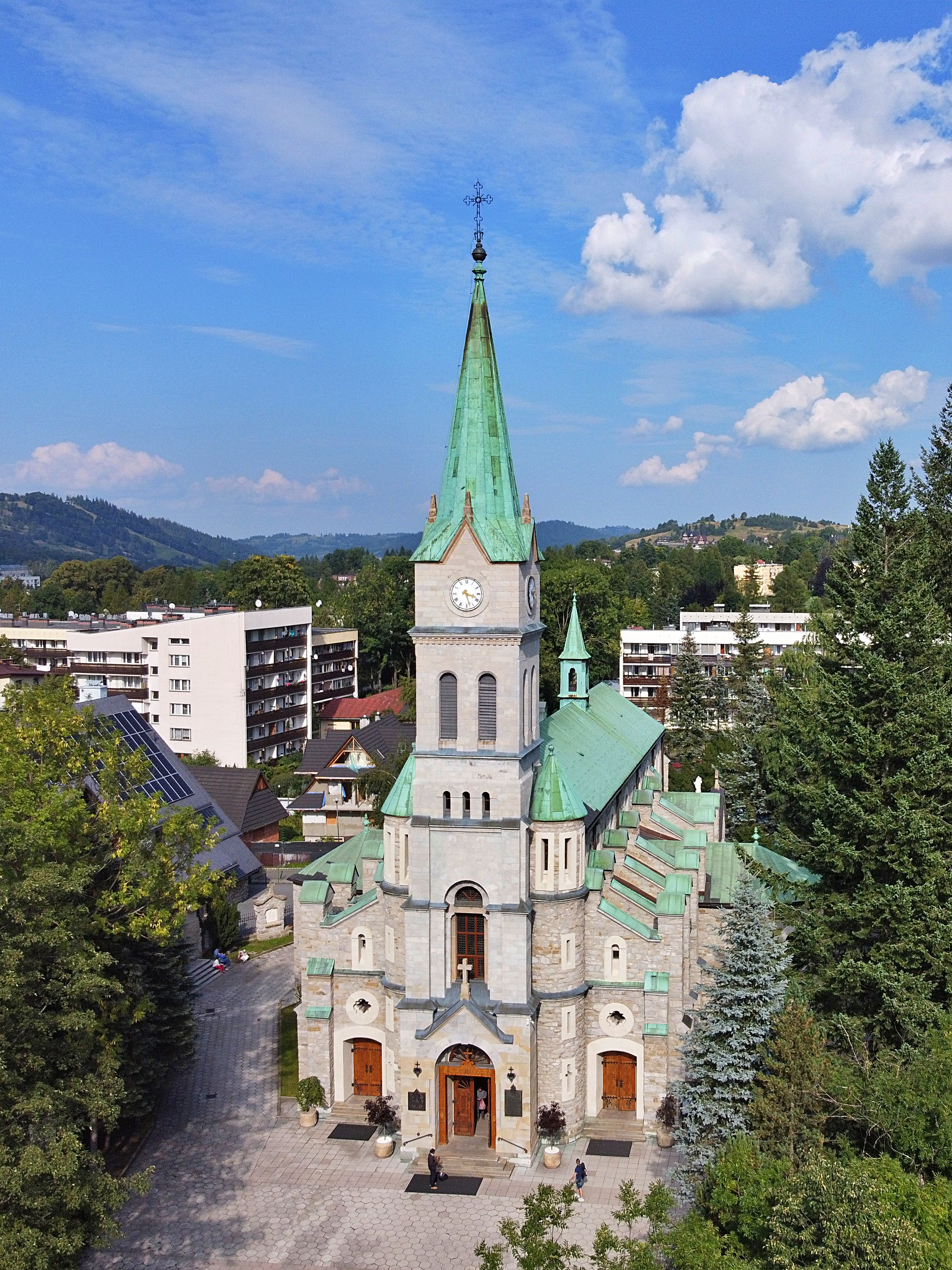
Romanesque Revival Church of the Holy Family

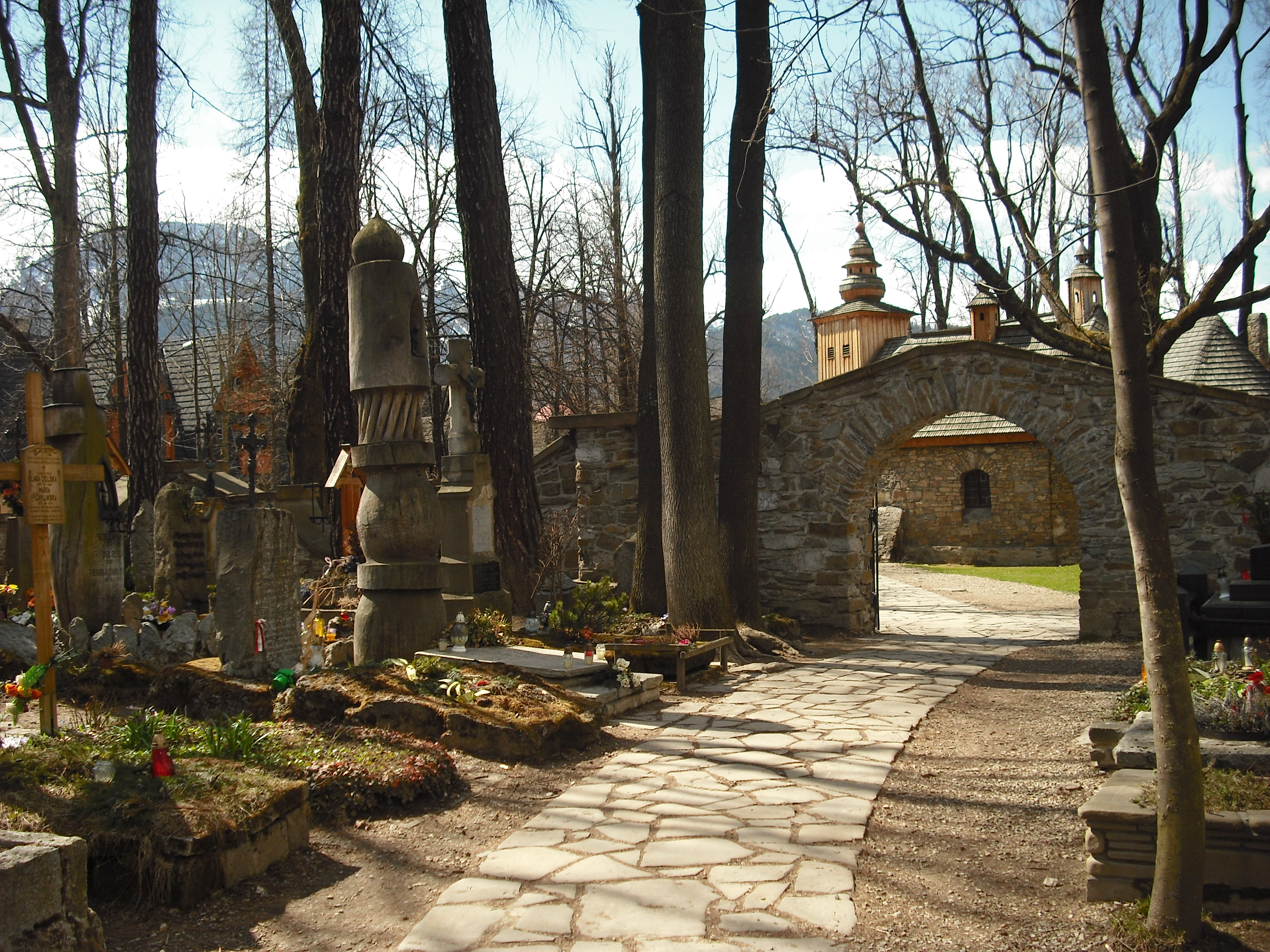
Old Cemetery in Pęksowy Brzyzek with the Church of Our Lady of Częstochowa in the background

== Culture ==
Since the end of the 19th century Zakopane was an important place for many artists, who frequently visited, worked or lived here, especially during the Young Poland period.

Today the city hosts many museums and galleries:

- Tatra Museum
- Museum of Tatra National Park
- Museum of Zakopane Style at Villa Koliba
- Villa Oksza Art Gallery
- Karol Szymanowski Museum in Villa Atma
- Jan Kasprowicz Museum in Villa Harenda
- Kornel Makuszyński Museum
- Władysław Hasior Gallery
- Kamil Stoch Museum Galeria Kamiland
- Museum of the Armed Resistance in the former Hotel Palace

== Sports ==
The Tatras are a popular destination among hikers, skiers, ski-tourers and climbers.

=== Mountaineering ===
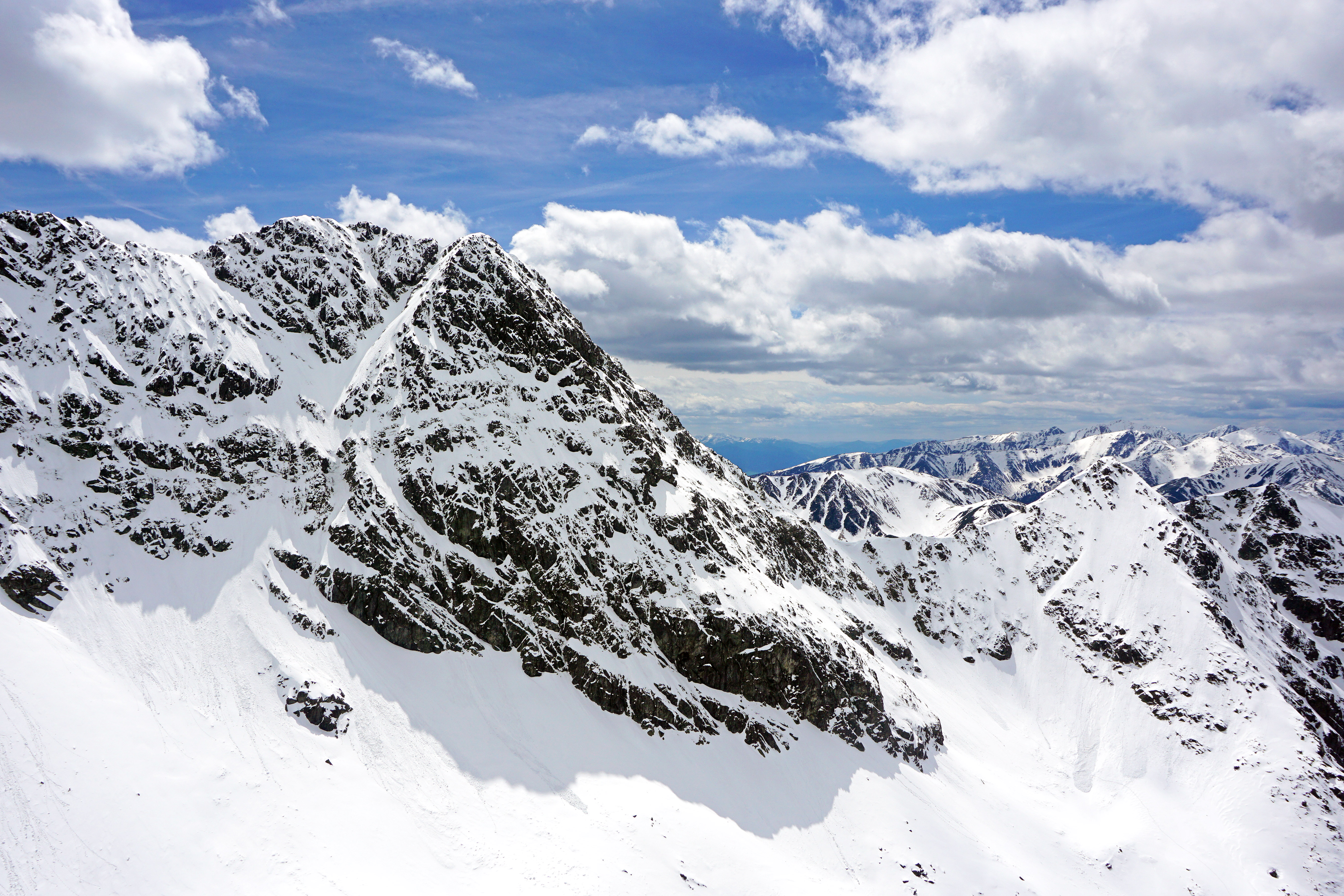
The High Tatras offer excellent opportunities for climbing. Świnica, here as seen from Kościelec, is the highest peak within the city limits, at 2,301 m (7,549 ft).

There is a network of well-marked hiking trails in the Tatras and according to the national park regulations the hikers must stick to them. Most of these trails are overcrowded, especially in the summer season.

The High Tatras offer excellent opportunities for climbing (up to X UIAA grade).

In summer, lightning and snow are both potential hazards for climbers, and the weather can change quickly. Thunderstorms are common in the afternoons. In winter the snow can be up to several meters deep.

=== Skiing ===
In the winter, thousands arrive in Zakopane to ski, especially around Christmas and in February. The most popular skiing areas are Kasprowy Wierch and Gubałówka. There are a number of cross country skiing trails in the forests surrounding the town.

Zakopane hosted the Nordic World Ski Championships in 1929, 1939, and 1962; the winter Universiades in 1956, 1993, and 2001; the biathlon World Championship; several ski jumping world cups; and several Nordic combined, Nordic and Alpine European Cups. It hosted the second Alpine World Ski Championships in 1939, the first outside the Alps and the last official world championships prior to World War II.

Zakopane made unsuccessful bids to host the 2006 Winter Olympics and the 2011 and 2013 Alpine World Ski Championships.

In February 1933, the Winter Maccabiah Games were held in Zakopane.

=== Football ===
In Zakopane, there are two football clubs – one of them is KS Zakopane, which was established in 2007 as a result of the merger of ZKP Zakopane and Jutrzenka Zakopane. It currently competes in the B-class league, in the Podhale II group. Its matches are played at the facility located at Orkana Street 6.

In the 2015/2016 season, the Football Club Zakopane was reactivated. After a successful 2015/16 season, in which the ZKP players managed to secure a promotion-eligible spot in the Podhale C-class, they are now playing in the Podhale B-class league.

== Tourism ==
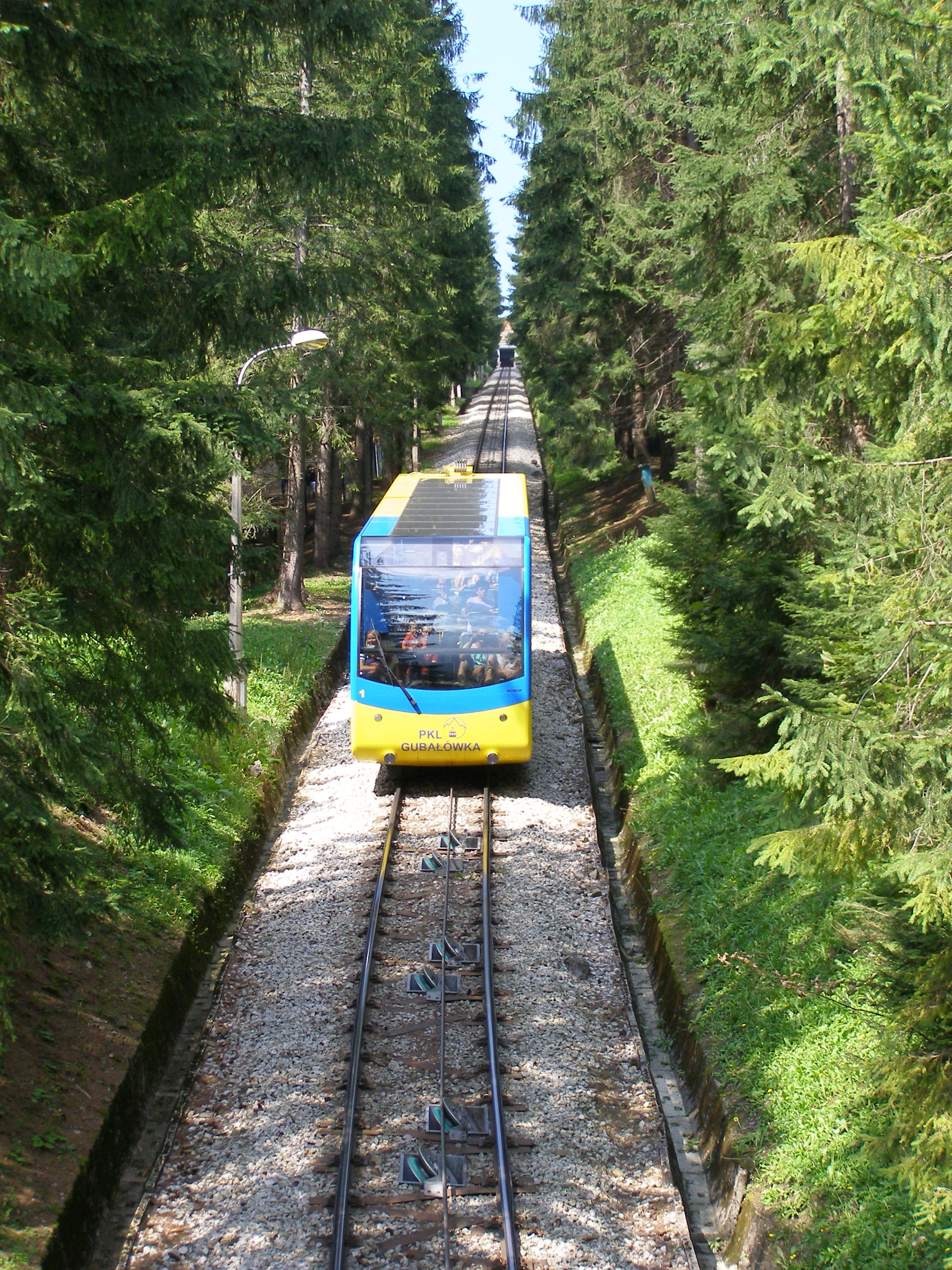
Gubałówka Hill funicular

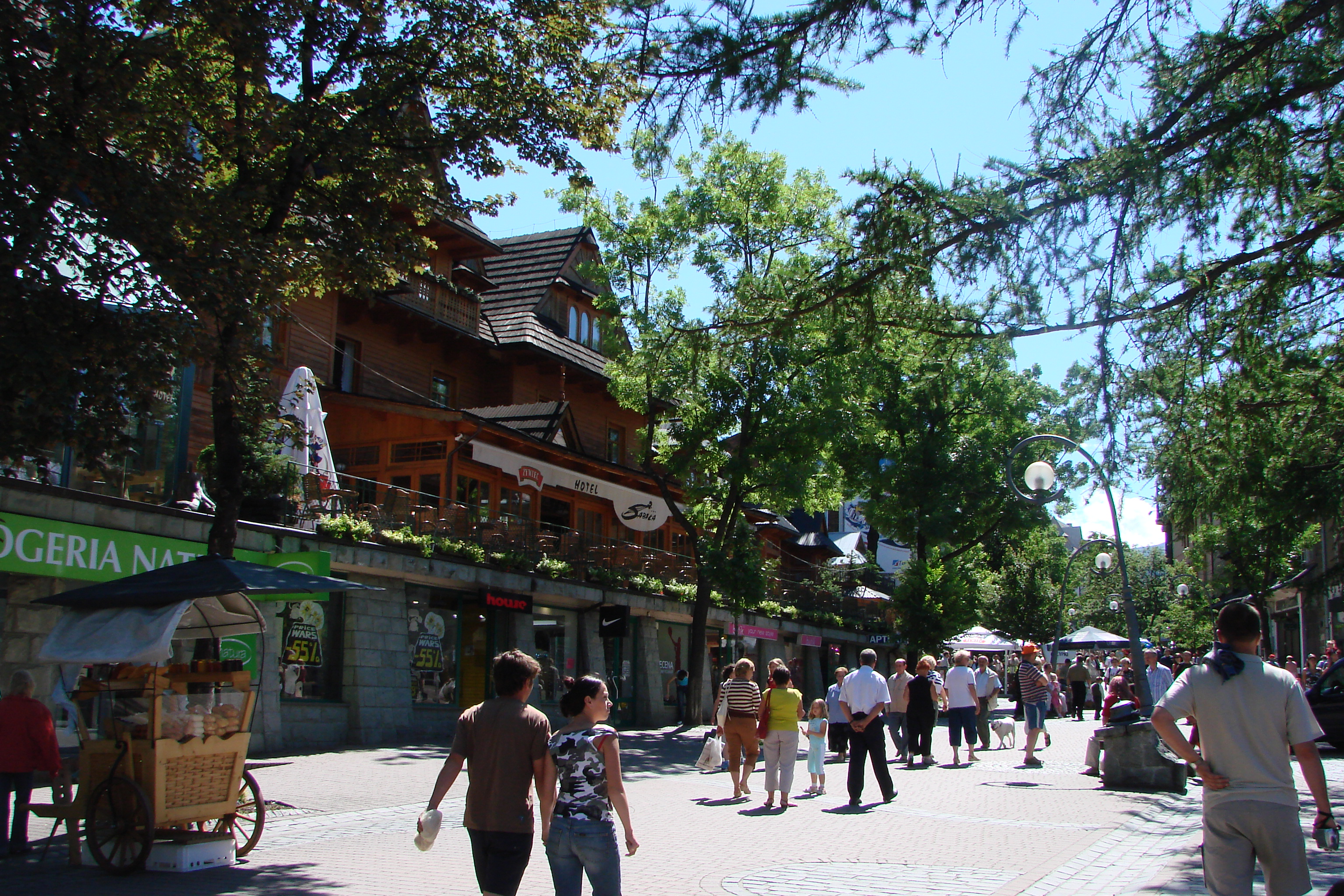
Krupówki Street

Zakopane is visited by over 2,500,000 tourists a year. In the winter, Zakopane's tourists are interested in winter sports activities such as skiing, snowboarding, ski jumping, snowmobiling, sleigh rides, snowshoe walks, and Ice skating. During the summer, Tourists come to do activities like hiking, climbing, bike and horse ride the Tatras mountain, there are many trails in the Tatras. Tourists ride quads and dirt bikes that you can rent. Swimming and boat rides on the Dunajec river are popular. Many come to experience Goral culture, which is rich in its unique styles of food, speech, architecture, music, and costume. Zakopane is especially popular during the winter holidays, which are celebrated in traditional style, with dances, decorated horse-pulled sleighs called kuligs and roast lamb.

A popular tourist activity is taking a stroll along the town's most popular street: Krupówki. It is lined with stores, restaurants, carnival rides, and performers.

During the winter and summer seasons, Krupówki Street is crowded with tourists visiting the shops and restaurants. In the summer, a local market along Krupówki Street offers traditional Goral apparel, leather jackets, fur coats, shoes, and purses. Venders also sell foods like the famous oscypek smoked sheep cheese, fruit, vegetables, and meats. There are also many stands with Zakopane souvenirs.

Zakopane is popular for its nightlife. At night there are always people walking around town checking out the different bars and dance clubs. Most of these bars and dance clubs are located on Krupowki street.

Other activities include also Zakopane's Thermal Baths - a modern aquapark with outside swimming pools with thermal water.

A scene in Andrzej Wajda's film Man of Marble (Człowiek z marmuru) was filmed in Zakopane, introducing the town to a worldwide audience.

The mountain scenes from the Bollywood film Fanaa were filmed around Zakopane.

== International relations ==
Zakopane participates in town twinning to foster international links.

- Bansko, Bulgaria
- San Carlos de Bariloche (Argentina)
- Bavel (Netherlands)
- Polonezköy, Turkey
- Poprad, Slovakia
- Saint-Dié-des-Vosges (France)
- Sopot, Poland
- Stryi, Ukraine
- Vysoké Tatry, Slovakia
- Siegen, Germany

== Notable structures ==
- COS Zakopane speed-skating rink
- Gubałówka Hill Funicular
- Kasprowy Wierch cable car
- Wielka Krokiew ski jumping ramp

== Notable residents ==
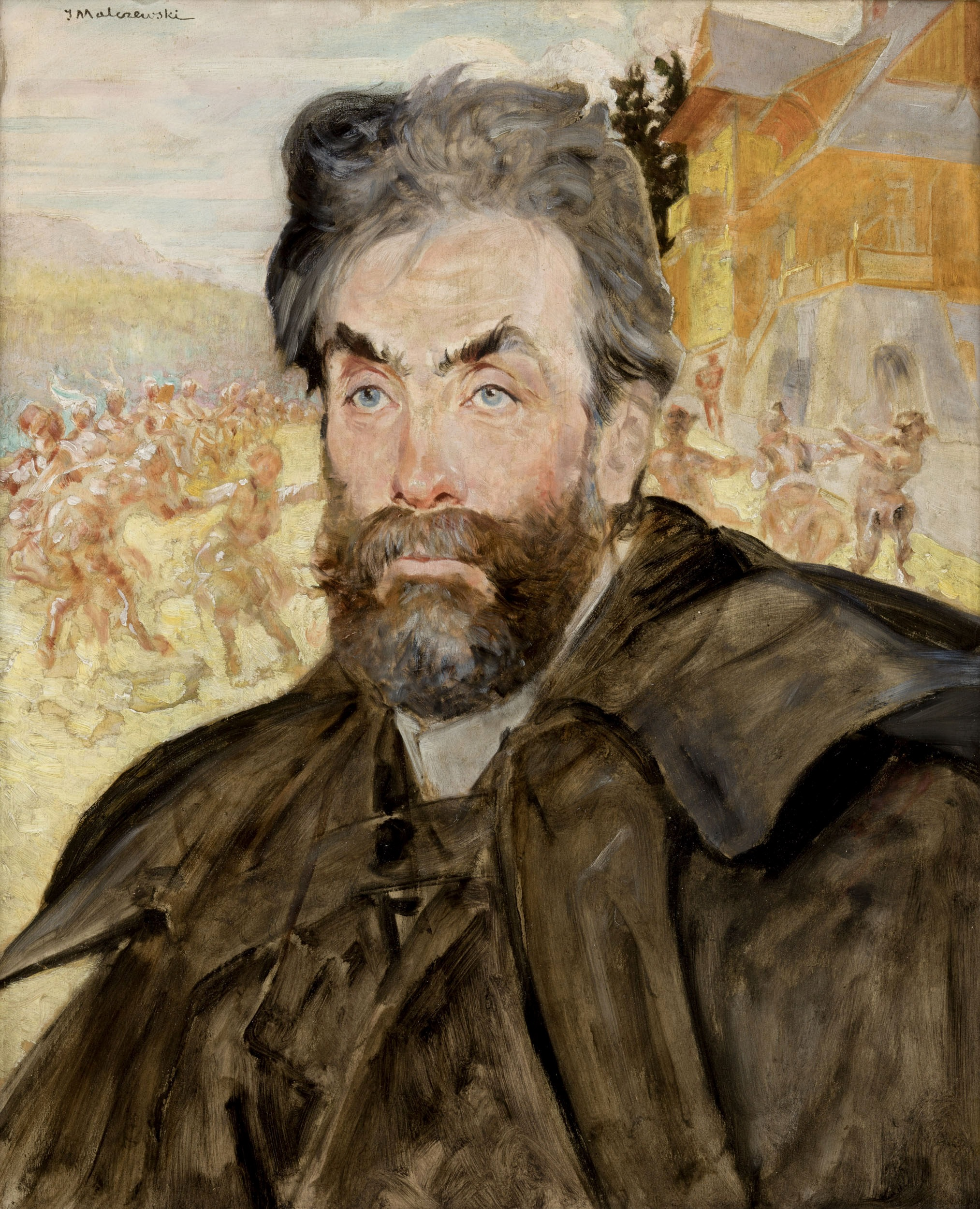
Stanisław Witkiewicz

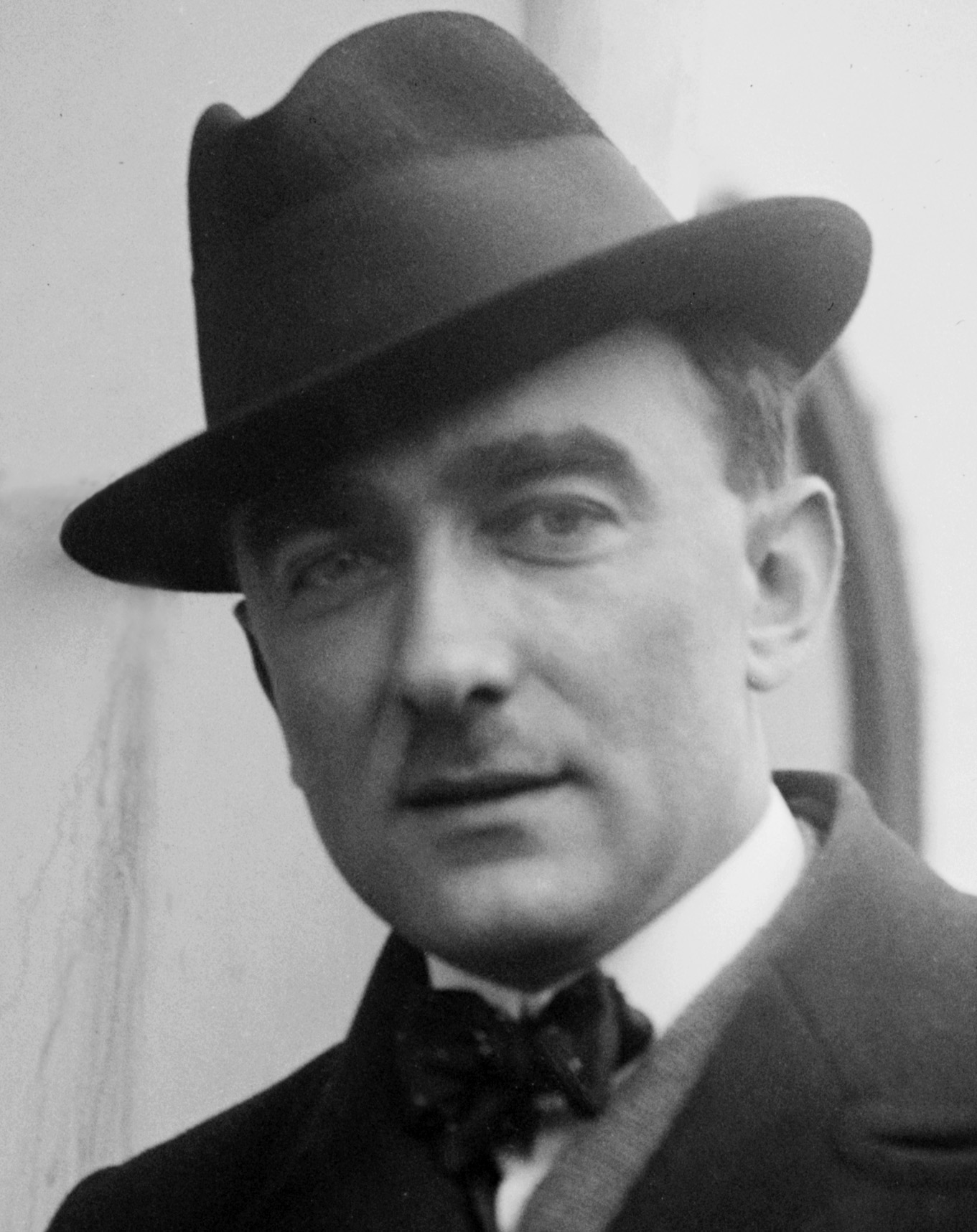
Karol Szymanowski

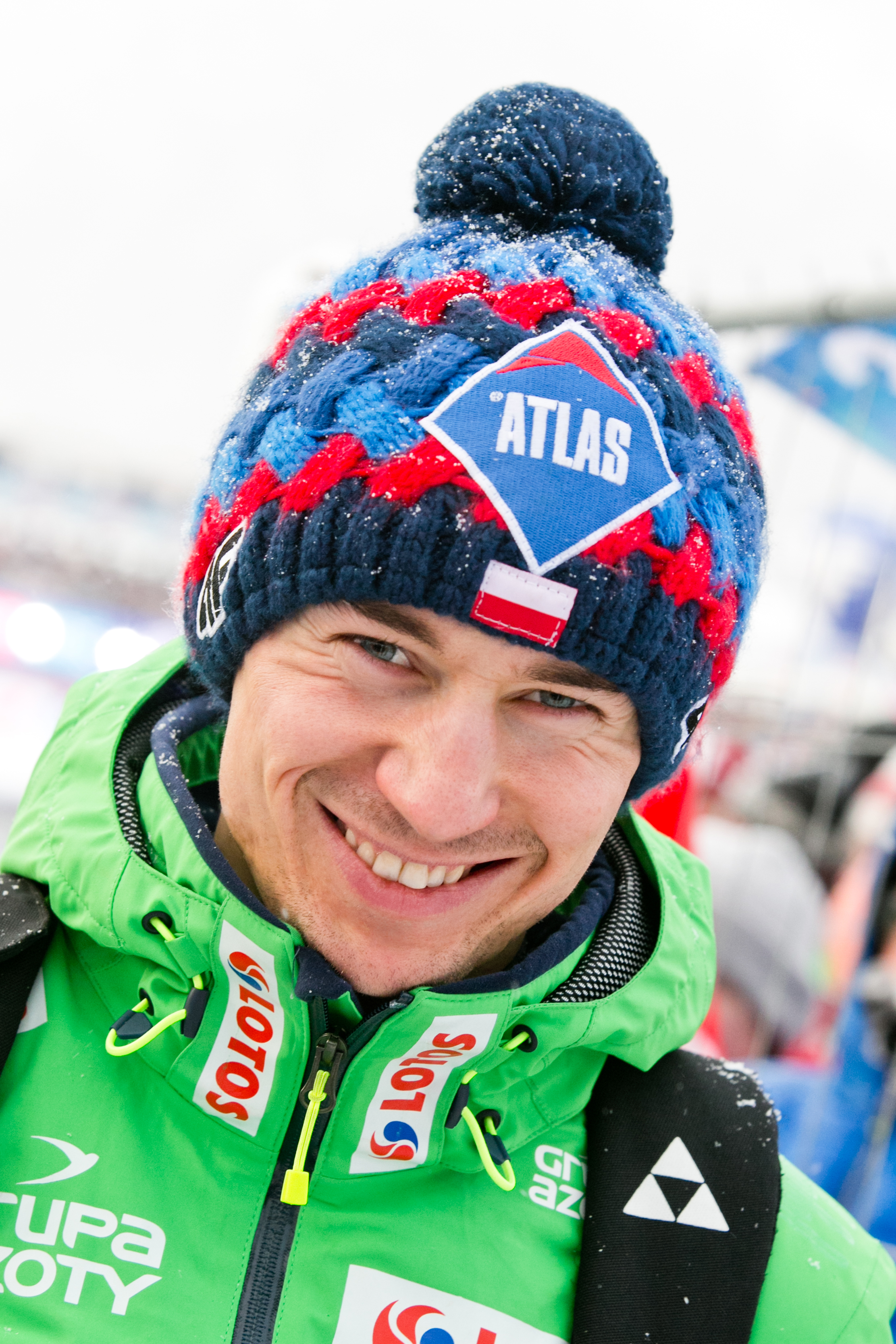
Kamil Stoch

- Tytus Chałubiński (1820–1889 in Zakopane), Polish physician and co-founder of the Polish Tatra Society
- Klemens Bachleda (1851–1910), Polish mountain guide and mountain rescuer, worked from Zakopane
- Stanisław Witkiewicz (1851–1915), Polish painter, architect, writer and art theoretician
- Jan Kasprowicz (1860–1926), Polish poet, playwright, critic and translator; a foremost representative of Young Poland
- Mariusz Zaruski (1867–1941), Polish Brigadier-General, a pioneer of Polish sports yachting, a climber of the Tatra Mountains, a photographer, painter, poet, a seaman, a conspirator, a social activist and teacher
- Jerzy Żuławski (1874–1915), Polish literary figure, philosopher, translator, alpinist and nationalist
- Władysław Orkan (1875–1930), Polish writer from the Young Poland period
- Mieczysław Karłowicz (1876–1909), Polish composer, conductor, mountaineer and photographer of the Tatra Mountains
- Karol Szymanowski (1882–1937), Polish composer and pianist, member of the modernist movement Young Poland; his house in Zakopane, the Villa Atma, is now a museum
- Kornel Makuszyński (1884–1953), Polish writer of children's and youth literature, elected member of the Polish Academy of Literature in interwar Poland
- Leon Chwistek (1884–1944), Polish philosopher, logician, mathematician, theoretician of art and painter
- Stanisław Ignacy Witkiewicz (1885–1939), Witkacy, a painter, philosopher, playwright, novelist and photographer
- Olga Drahonowska-Małkowska (1888–1979 in Zakopane), with her husband, founded scouting in Poland
- Count Edward Bernard Raczyński (1891–1993), Polish diplomat, writer, politician and President of Poland in exile
- Aniela Chałubińska (1902–1998), Polish geographer, geologist and university professor
- Anna Zofia Krygowska (1904–1988), Polish mathematician, known for her work in mathematics education
- Wawrzyniec Żuławski (1916 in Zakopane–1957), Wawa Polish alpinist, educator, composer, music critic, and musicologist
- Władysław Hasior (1928–1999), Polish contemporary sculptor from Podhale region, a painter and theatre set designer
- Teresa Bogucka (born 1945 in Zakopane), journalist, writer, a democratic opposition activist in Communist Poland
- Andrzej Gąsienica-Makowski (born 1952 in Zakopane), politician, led the Nonpartisan Bloc for Support of Reforms
- Janusz Waluś (born 1953 in Zakopane), assassinated Chris Hani, General Secretary of the South African Communist Party
- Liz Glazowski (born 1957 in Zakopane), Polish-American model, Playboy magazine's Playmate of the Month in April 1980
- Sergiusz Pinkwart (born 1973), Polish journalist, writer, classical musician and traveler, Magellan Award winner
- Małgorzata Mirga-Tas (born 1978), Polish-Romani visual artist
- Małgorzata Babiarz (born 1984 in Zakopane), professionally known as Megitza is a singer, double bass player and composer

=== Sport ===
- Stanisław Marusarz (1913 in Zakopane – 1993 in Zakopane), Polish Nordic skiing competitor in the 1930s
- Jan Wojciech Bachleda-Curuś (1951 in Zakopane – 2009) Polish alpine skier who competed in the 1976 Winter Olympics
- Wojciech Fortuna (born 1952 in Zakopane), ski jumper, Olympic gold medallist
- Kamil Stoch (born 1987 in Zakopane), Polish ski jumper, world champion and three-time Olympic gold medalist
- Andrzej Bargiel (born 1988), first person to ski down Mount Everest without bottled oxygen and first person to ski all 8,000-meter summits in the Karakoram Range
- Oskar Kwiatkowski (born 1996 in Zakopane), Polish snowboarder

== Notable visitors ==
- Henryk Sienkiewicz (1846–1916)
- Bolesław Prus (1847 – 1912)
- Joseph Conrad (1857 – 1924)
- Stefan Żeromski (1864 – 1925)
- Bronisława Dłuska, (1865 – 1939) Polish physician, older sister of physicist Marie Curie
- Marie Curie (1867 – 1934)
- Józef Piłsudski (1867 – 1935)
- Vladimir Lenin (1870 – 1924)
- Alfred Döblin (1878 – 1957)
- Aniela Zagórska (1881 – 1943) niece of Joseph Conrad
- Rudolf Weigl (1883 – 1957)
- Edward Rydz-Śmigły (1886 – 1941), Marshal of Poland, who painted some Zakopane sights
- Artur Rubinstein (1887 – 1982)
- Julian Tuwim (1894 – 1953), died in Zakopane
- Krystyna Skarbek (1908 – 1952)
- Stanisław Lem (1921 – 2006)
- Charles III (born 1948)

== Gallery ==
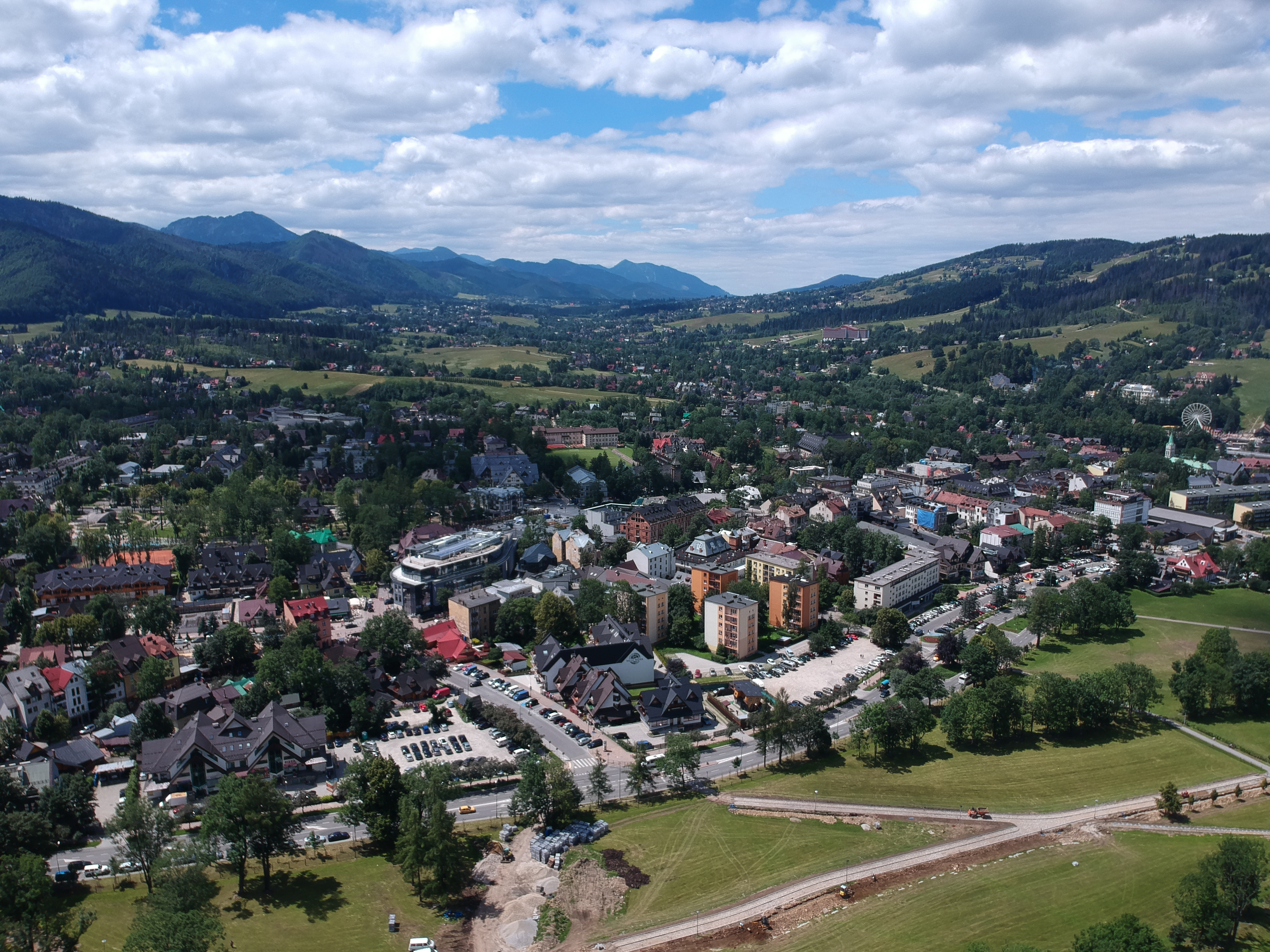
Aerial view of Zakopane

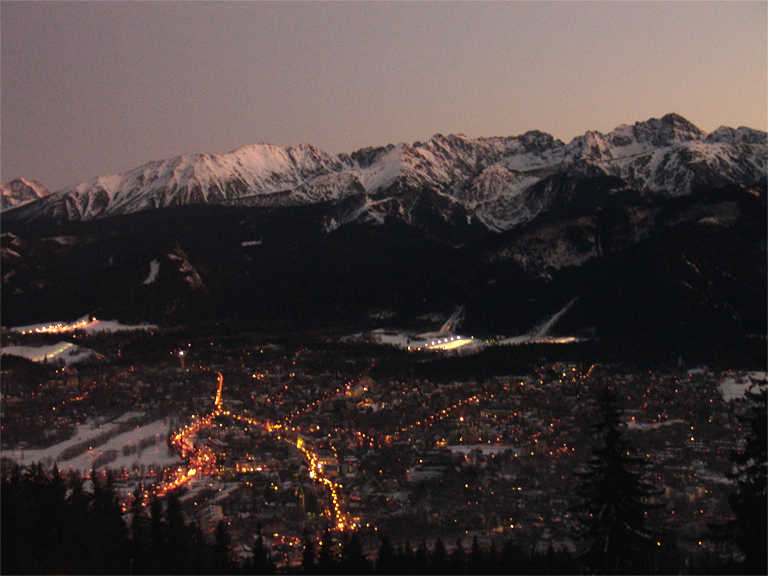
Zakopane at night

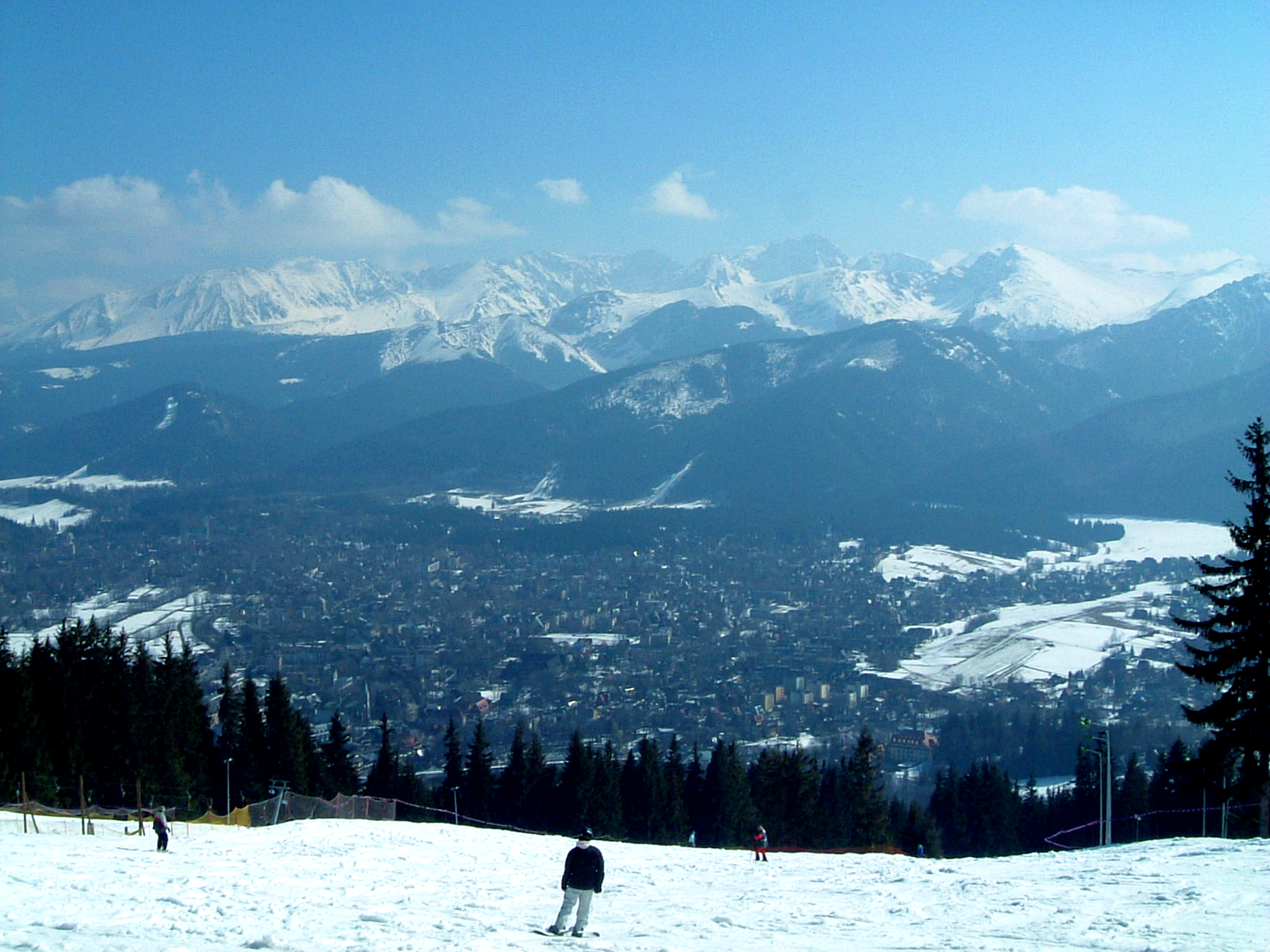
Zakopane - view from Gubałówka Hill (Tatra Mountains in the background)

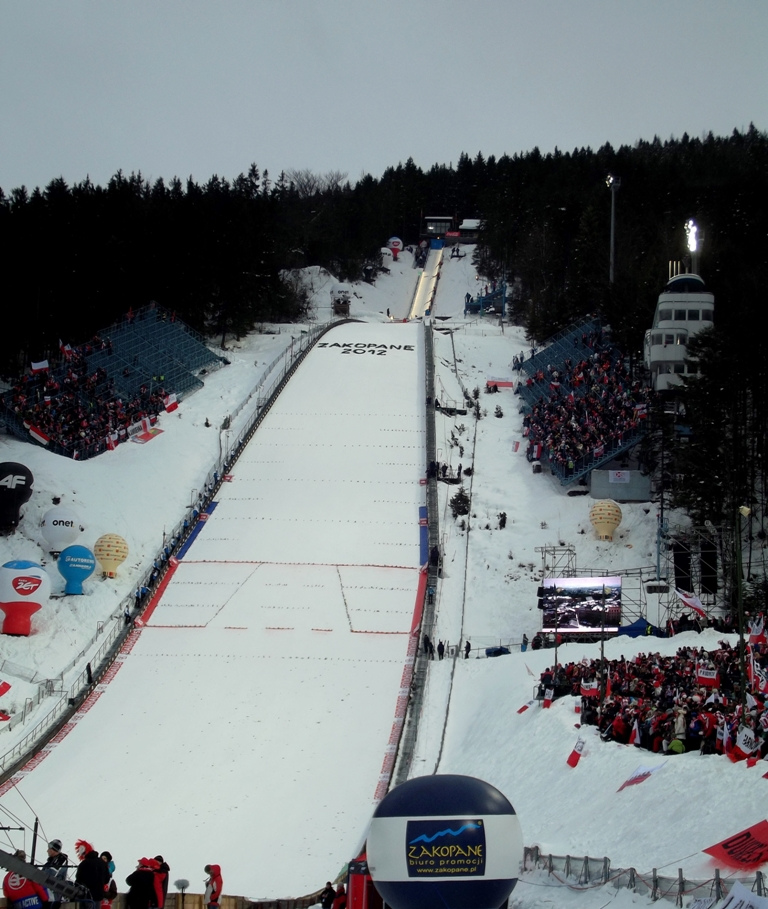
Wielka Krokiew ski jumping hill

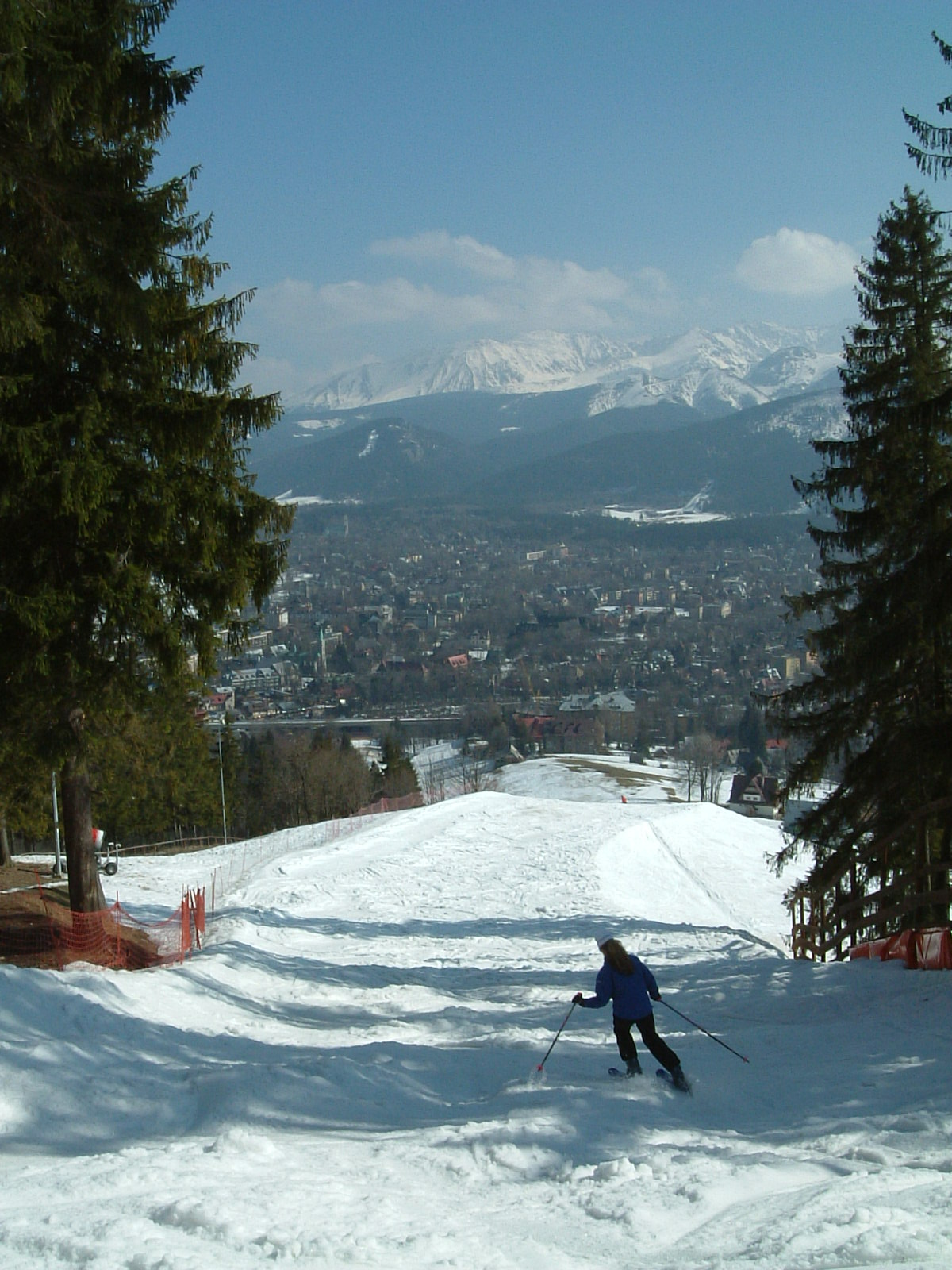
Zakopane - Gubałówka Hill ski run

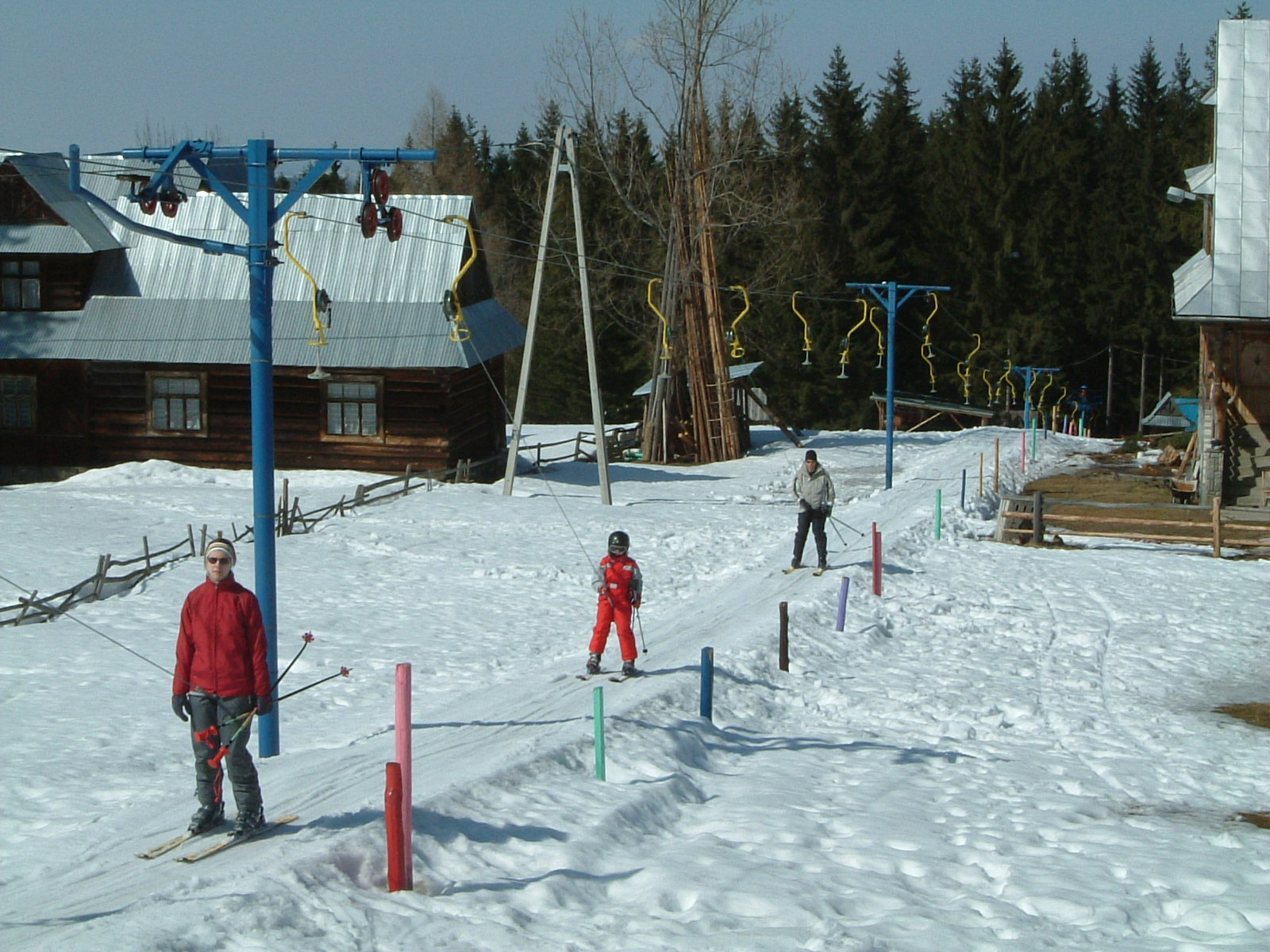
Zakopane - Gubałówka Hill: a nursery ski run

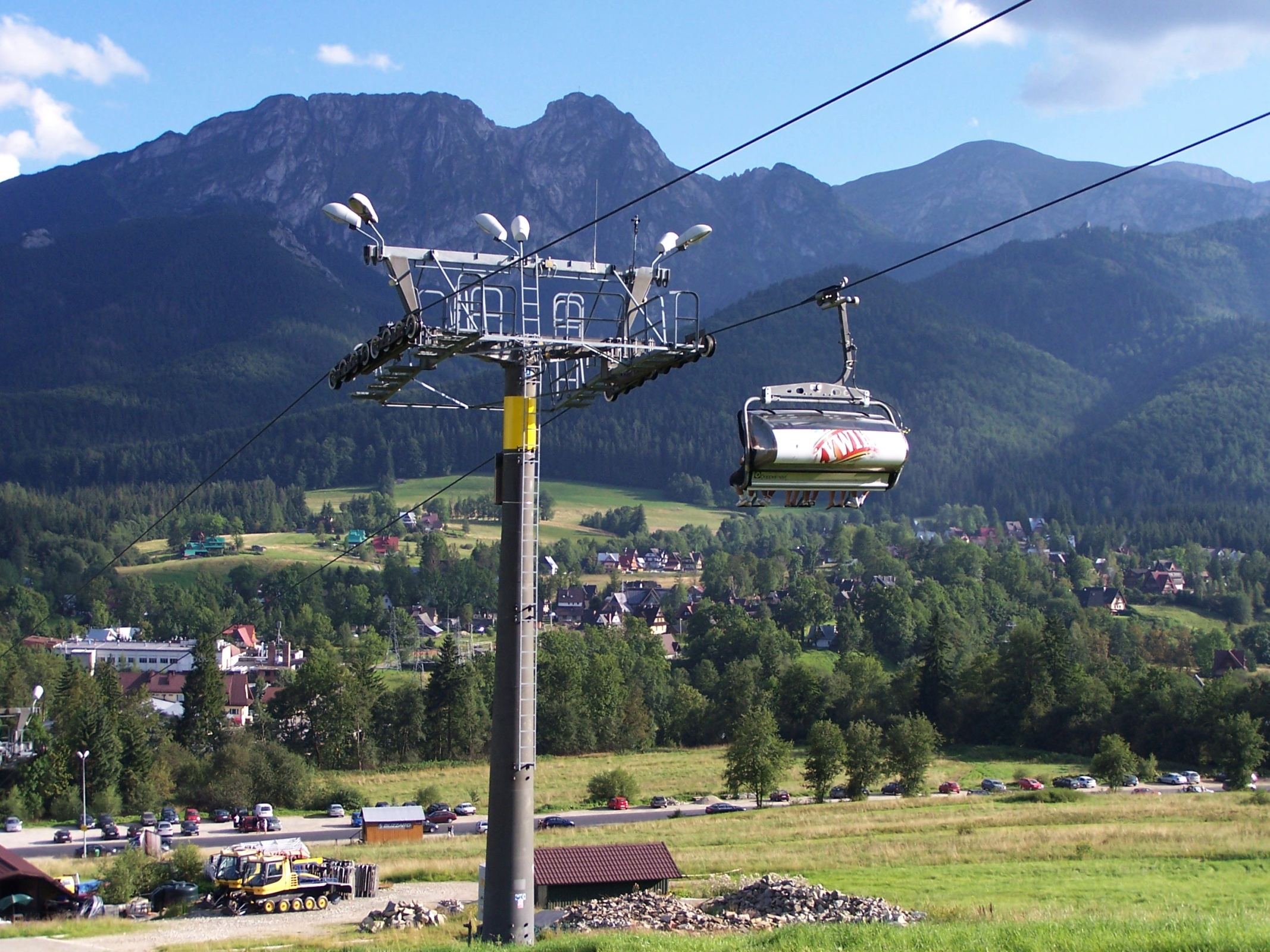
Polana Szymoszkowa ski lift

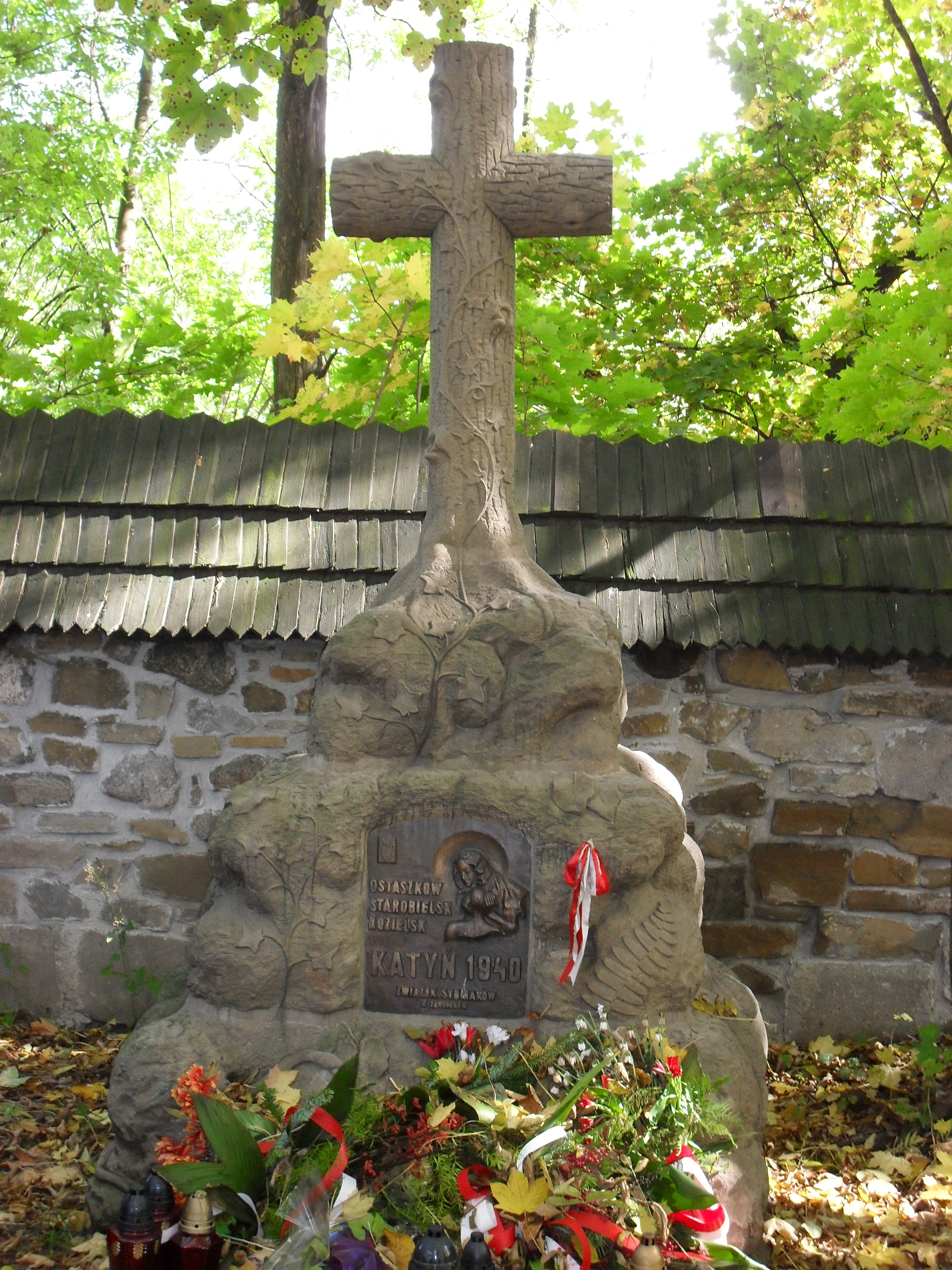
Katyń Memorial in Peksów Brzyzek Cemetery

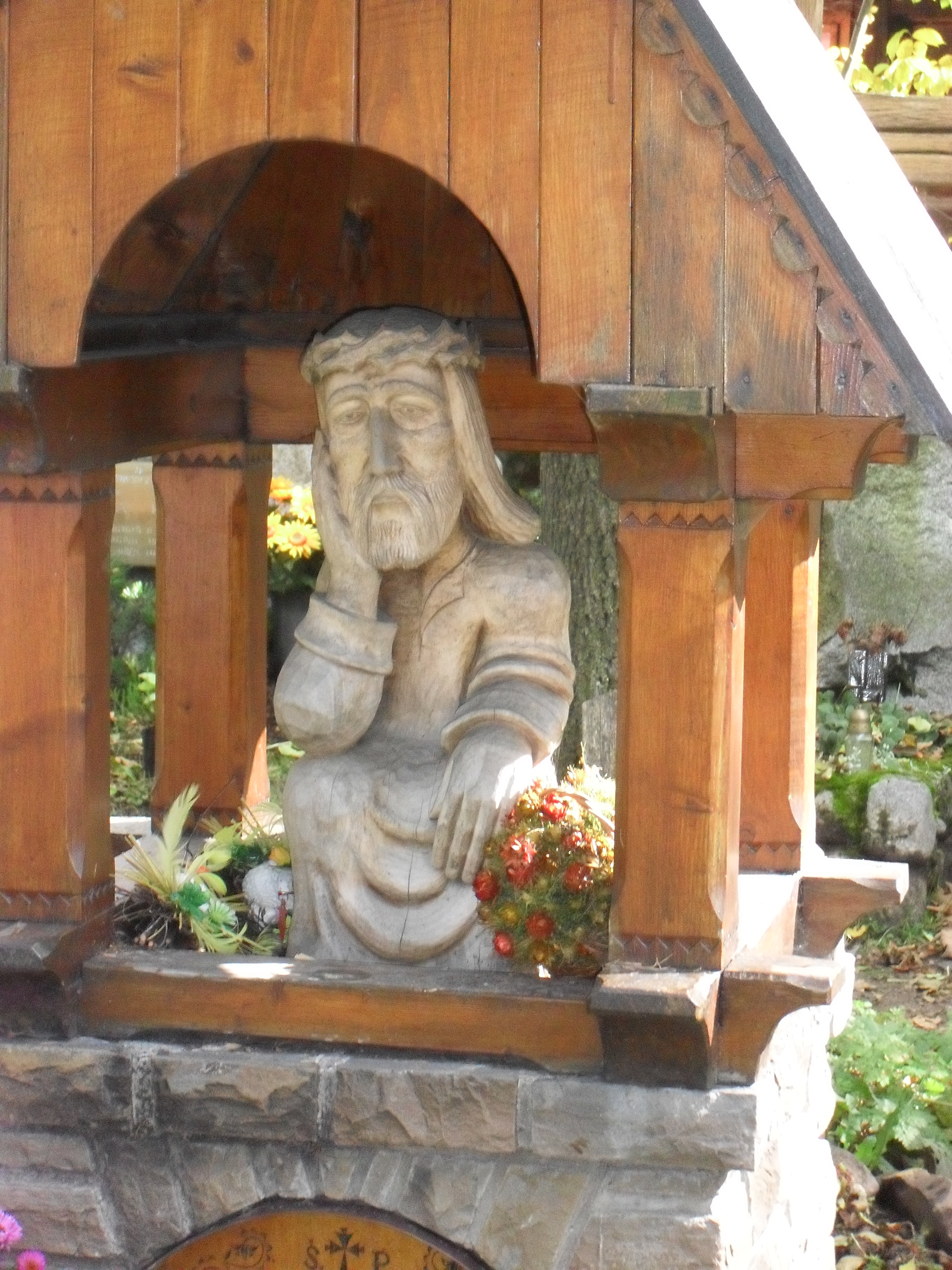
Traditional wooden shrine

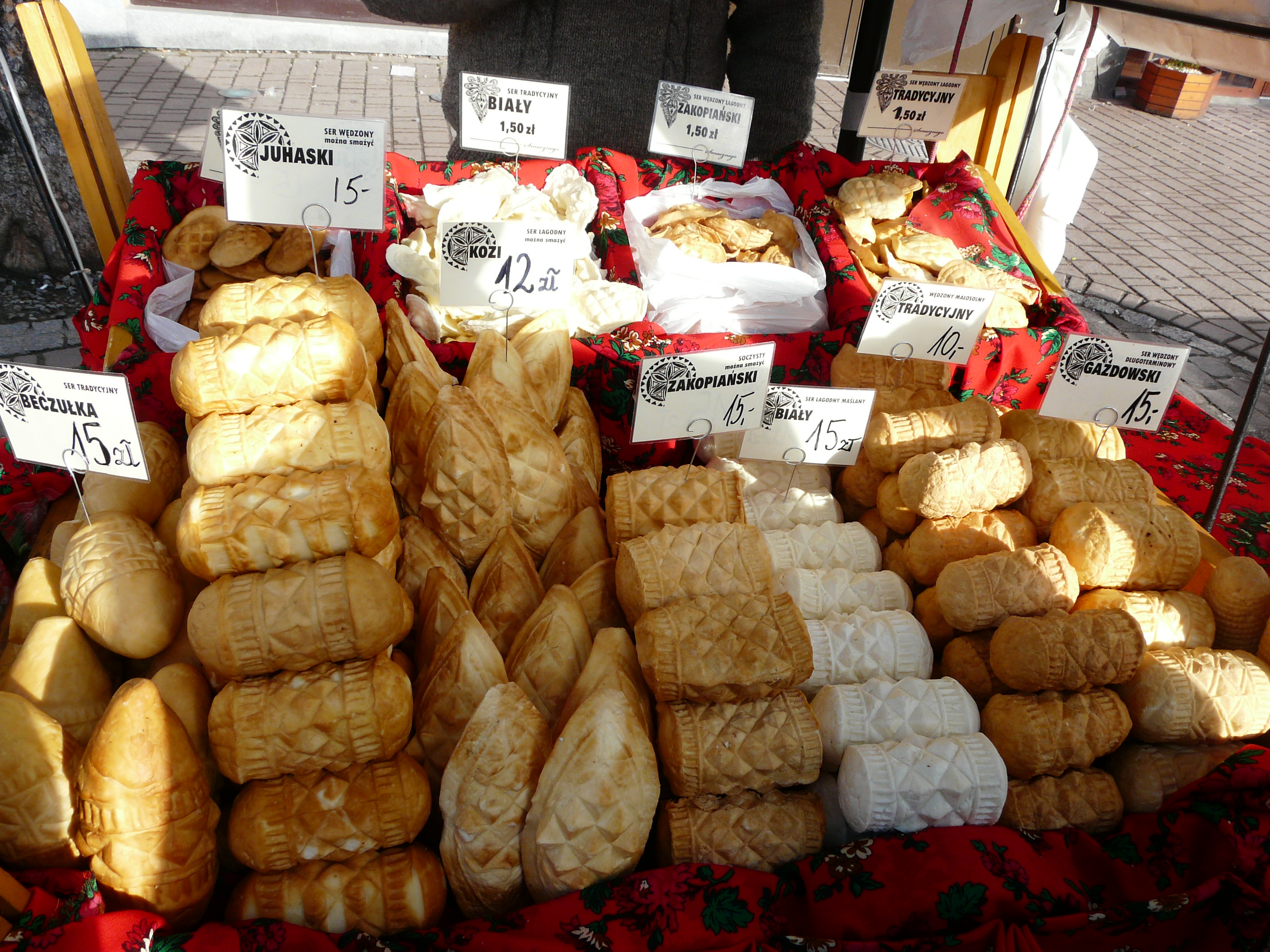
Traditional oscypek cheese

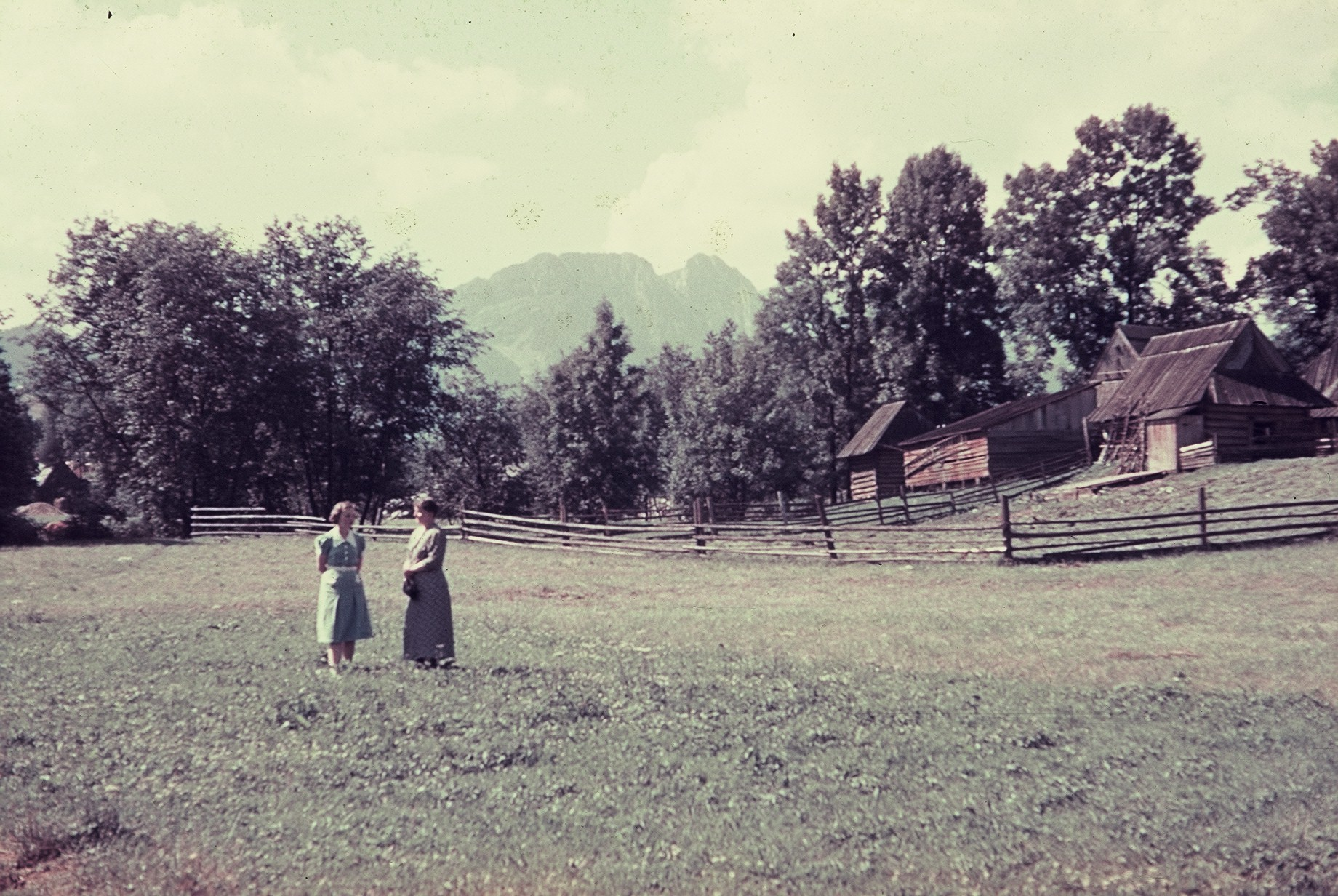
Zakopane, mountain massif Giewont (1938)

Old Church in Zakopane, oil painting by Edward Rydz-Śmigły.

== Bibliography ==
- Stanisław Kasztelowicz and Stanisław Eile, Stefan Żeromski: kalendarz życia i twórczości (Stefan Żeromski: A Calendar of His Life and Work), Kraków, Wydawnictwo Literackie, 1961.
- Zdzisław Najder, Joseph Conrad: A Life, translated by Halina Najder, Rochester, New York, Camden House, 2007, ISBN 1-57113-347-X.
- Krystyna Tokarzówna and Stanisław Fita, Bolesław Prus, 1847–1912: Kalendarz życia i twórczości (Bolesław Prus, 1847–1912: A Calendar of His Life and Work), edited by Zygmunt Szweykowski, Warsaw, Państwowy Instytut Wydawniczy, 1969.
