= The Lost Soul =

Picture book written by Olga Tokarczuk

- First edition (Polish)
- Author: Olga Tokarczuk
- Illustrator: Joanna Concejo
- Language: Polish
- Genre: Picture Book
- Published: 2017 (Wydawnictwo Format) (Polish) 2021 (Seven Stories Press) (English)
- Publisher: Seven Stories Press
- Publication place: Poland
- ISBN: 978-16-44210-35-2

The Lost Soul (Polish: Zgubiona Dusza) is a picture book written by Olga Tokarczuk and illustrated by Joanna Concejo. Originally published in 2017 by Wydawnictwo Format, the book has since been translated into more than twenty-one languages and has sold over one hundred thousand copies. It has been characterised as a picture book that speaks to both children and adults. The story follows a man named John who loses his soul in the flurry of daily life and must wait in one place for it to find him. The book has won awards at both the Bologna Book Fair as well as the Łódź Design Festival and has had its illustrations featured in multiple exhibitions throughout Poland.

== Summary ==
The Lost Soul follows the story of an old man who works so hard that he leaves his soul behind him in the process. While he continues to eat, sleep, work, drive, and play tennis, the man still feels as if the world is two-dimensional. One night, the man is awakened by a panic attack and cannot remember where he is or what his name is. While standing in front of his bathroom mirror, in which his reflection is but a blurred streak, the man forgets his name until finding his passport and seeing that it is John. The next day, John visits an old, wise doctor who tells him that the world is filled with people who have lost their souls, accidentally leaving them behind as they are unable to keep up with the pace of everyday life. As a result, the souls lose their heads and the people lose their hearts.

John is alarmed by this and asks the doctor if he too has lost his soul. The doctor replies that he has, as souls move much slower than their bodies, and now he must wait for his soul for an indefinite amount of time in a quiet place of his own. John follows the doctor's advice and settles down in an old cottage long enough for his hair and beard to grow long. He waits until one afternoon when his soul, who takes the form of a young girl, knocks at the door. John and his soul reunite and John makes sure to slow his life down in order to not lose his soul again. He buries his watches and suitcases in the garden, which then bloom into colorful flowers and large pumpkins and provide him with food for the following winters, and John and his soul live happily ever after.

== Illustration ==
The Lost Soul is precisely illustrated by award-winning Polish artist Joanna Concejo. Its illustrations tell the story of the accompanying text as well as an independent story centered around a pair of gloves kept together by a pair of strings. The illustrations, worn and discolored, are used to represent the childhood of adults and the cathartic feeling associated with it. Concejo completed her illustrations on old accounting graph paper. The yellowed graph paper gives the impression of an artist's notebook while tracing paper serves as a tool to define time sequences. She used both pencil and colored pencils to create her drawings.

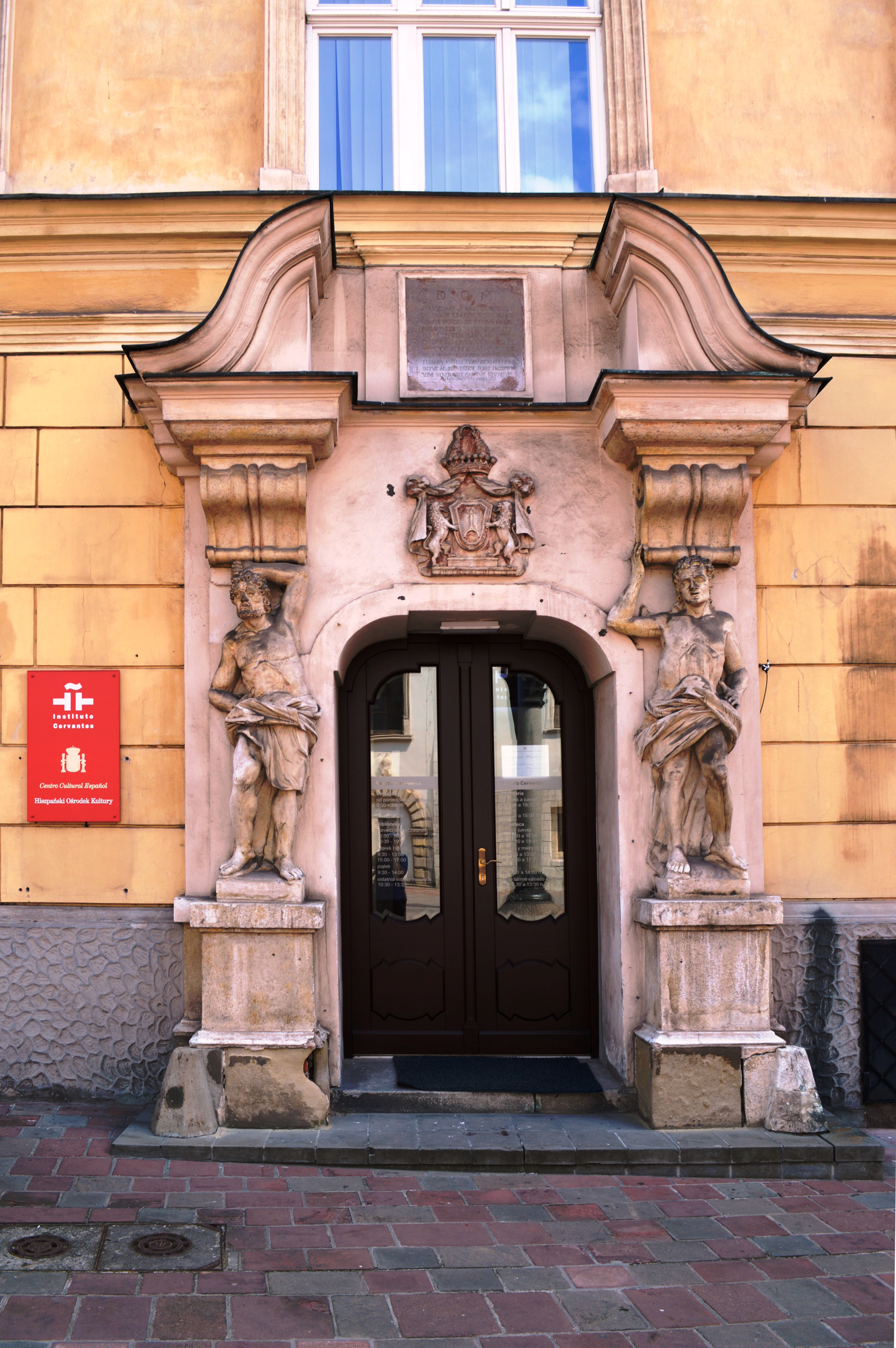
Cervantes Institute (exhibition venue)

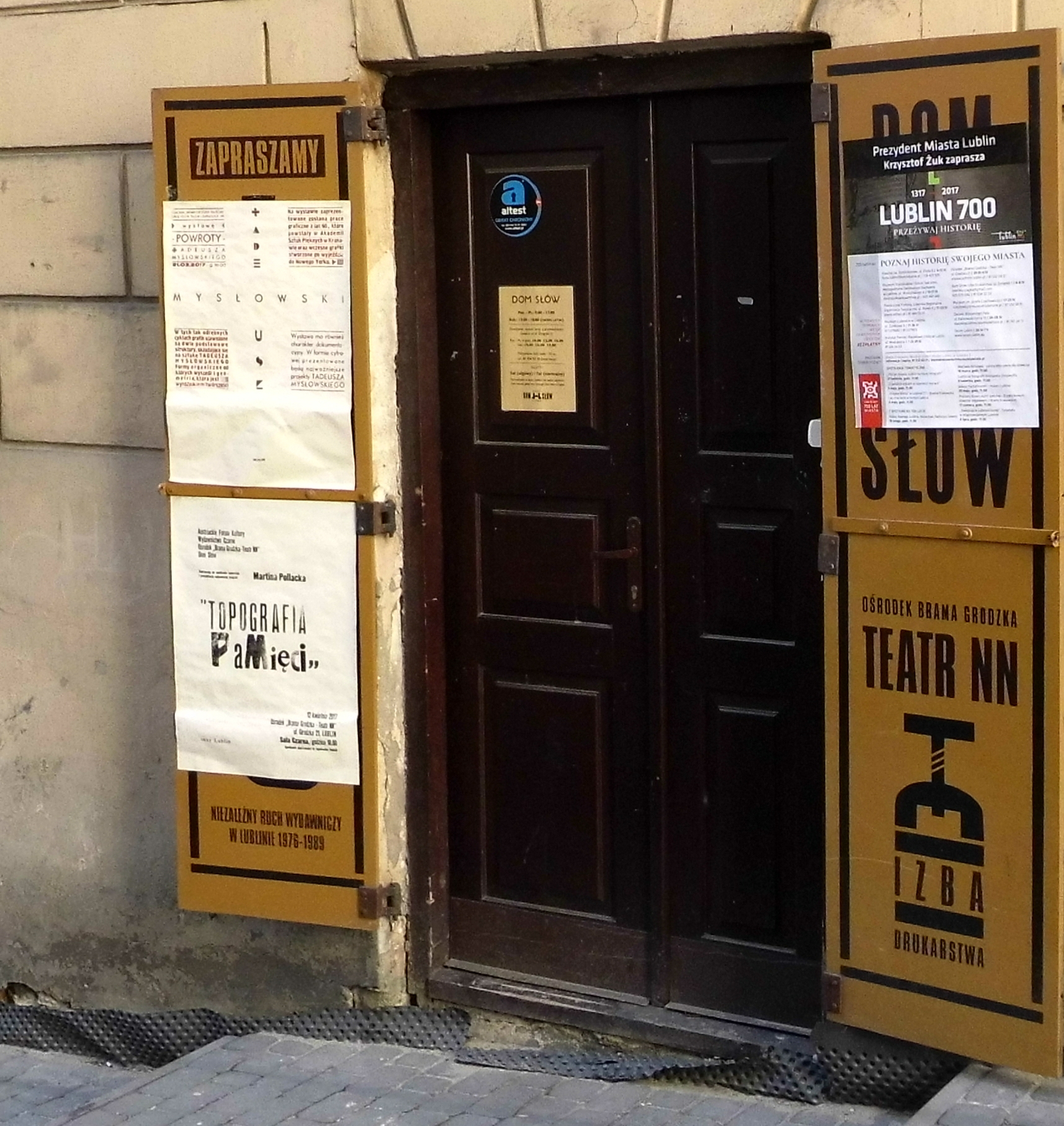
Dom Słów The House of Words (exhibition venue)

=== Exhibitions of artwork ===
==== 2018 ====
Twelve illustrations from the book that presented a “moving story about waiting, patience, and mindfulness” were displayed at the Wyspiański Pavilion in Krakow, Poland, from February 15 until March 9.

Concejo's illustrations and Tokarczuk's sketchbooks were on display at Dom Słów, The House of Words, in Lublin, Poland, from October 5 until November 5.

==== 2019 ====
To celebrate the translation of the book into Galician, Catalan, and Basque Spanish, twenty-three of Concejo's illustrations were displayed at the Cervantes Institute in December in Krakow, Poland.

== Translation ==
In 2021, The Lost Soul was translated into English by Antonia Lloyd-Jones and published by Seven Stories Press with the support of the Book Institute and the ©POLAND Translation Programme. The Book Institute has also supported translations of the book into Danish (translated by Hanne Lone Tønnesen), Czech (translated by Barbora Doležalova), French (translated by Margot Carlier), Hungarian (translated by Viktória Kellermann), Catalan (translated by Xavier Farré), Bulgarian (translated by Silvia Borisova), and Spanish (translated by Xavier Farré).

== Awards ==
In 2018, The Lost Soul was awarded the Fiction Bologna Ragazzi Prize at the Bologna Book Fair. The verdict of the Bologna Ragazzi Prize's jury stated this was because of how the philosophical subject of the book was investigated through Joanna Concejo's illustrations. The book also won awards within the “must-have” program in the Łódź Design Festival, a competition and plebiscite that awards the best Polish products.
