= Tourism in Poland =

- Poland's top ten urban destinations
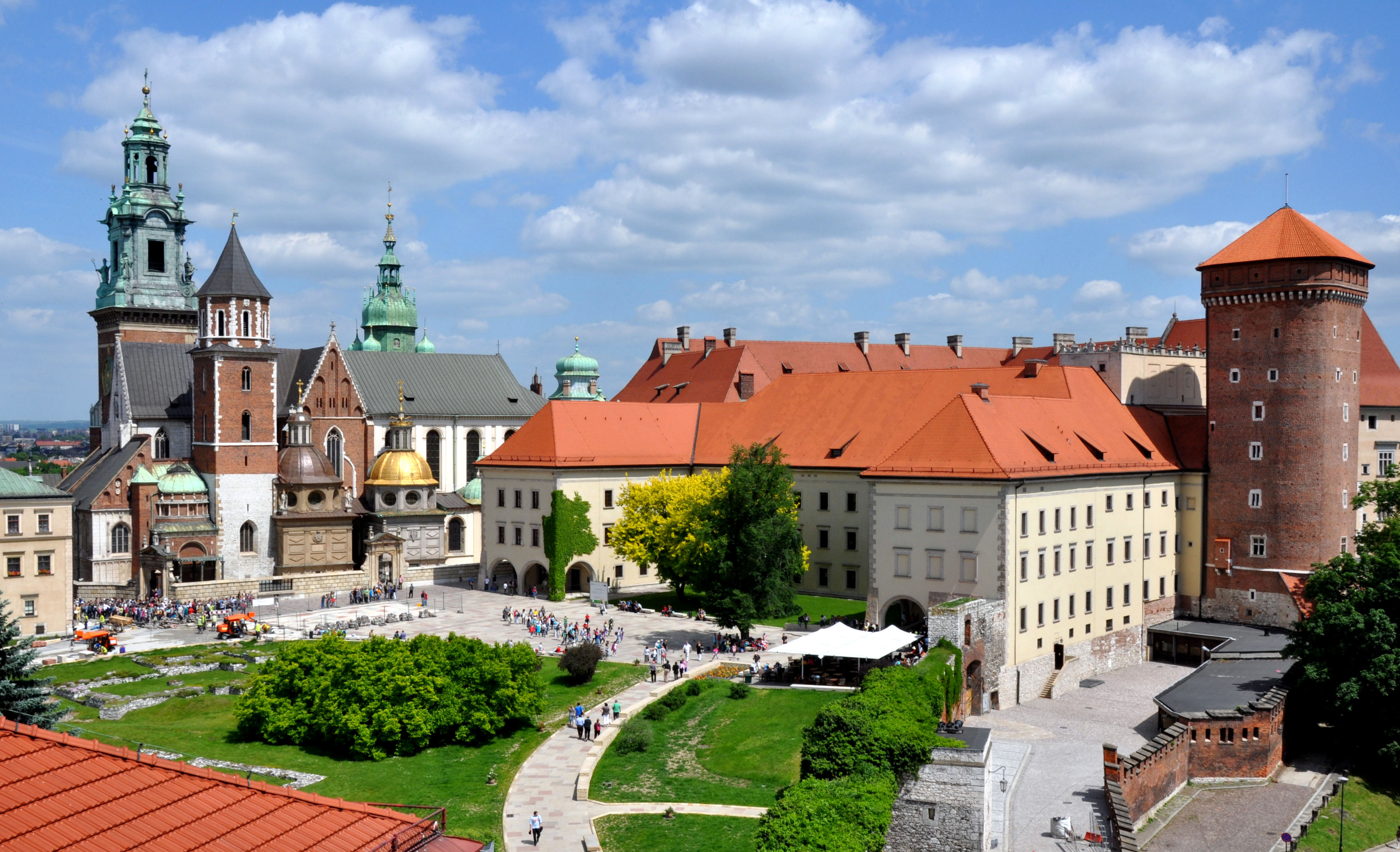
- Kraków, royal palace at Wawel on the Vistula river, UNESCO World Heritage Site

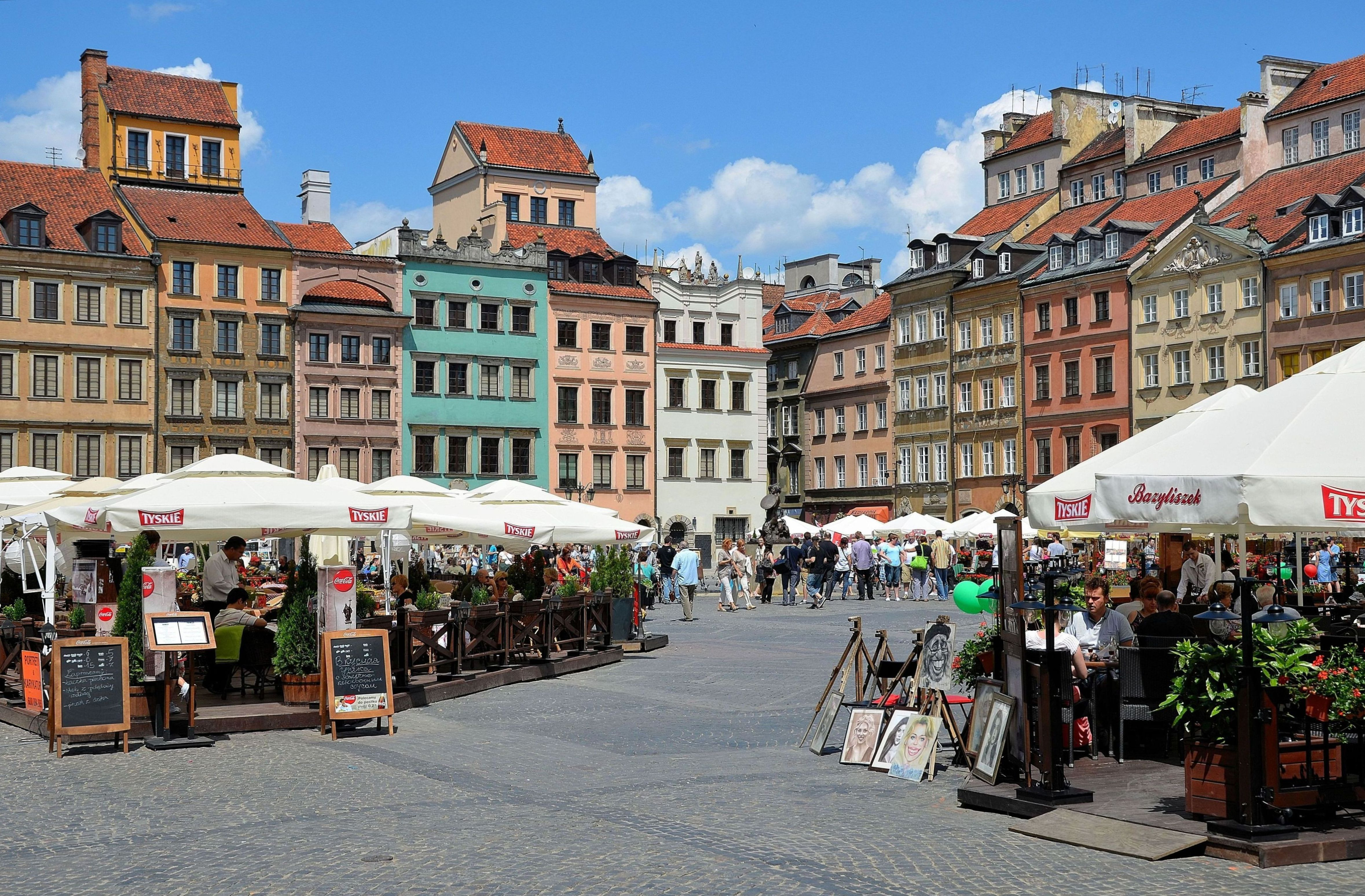
- Warsaw, Old Town Market Square, UNESCO World Heritage Site

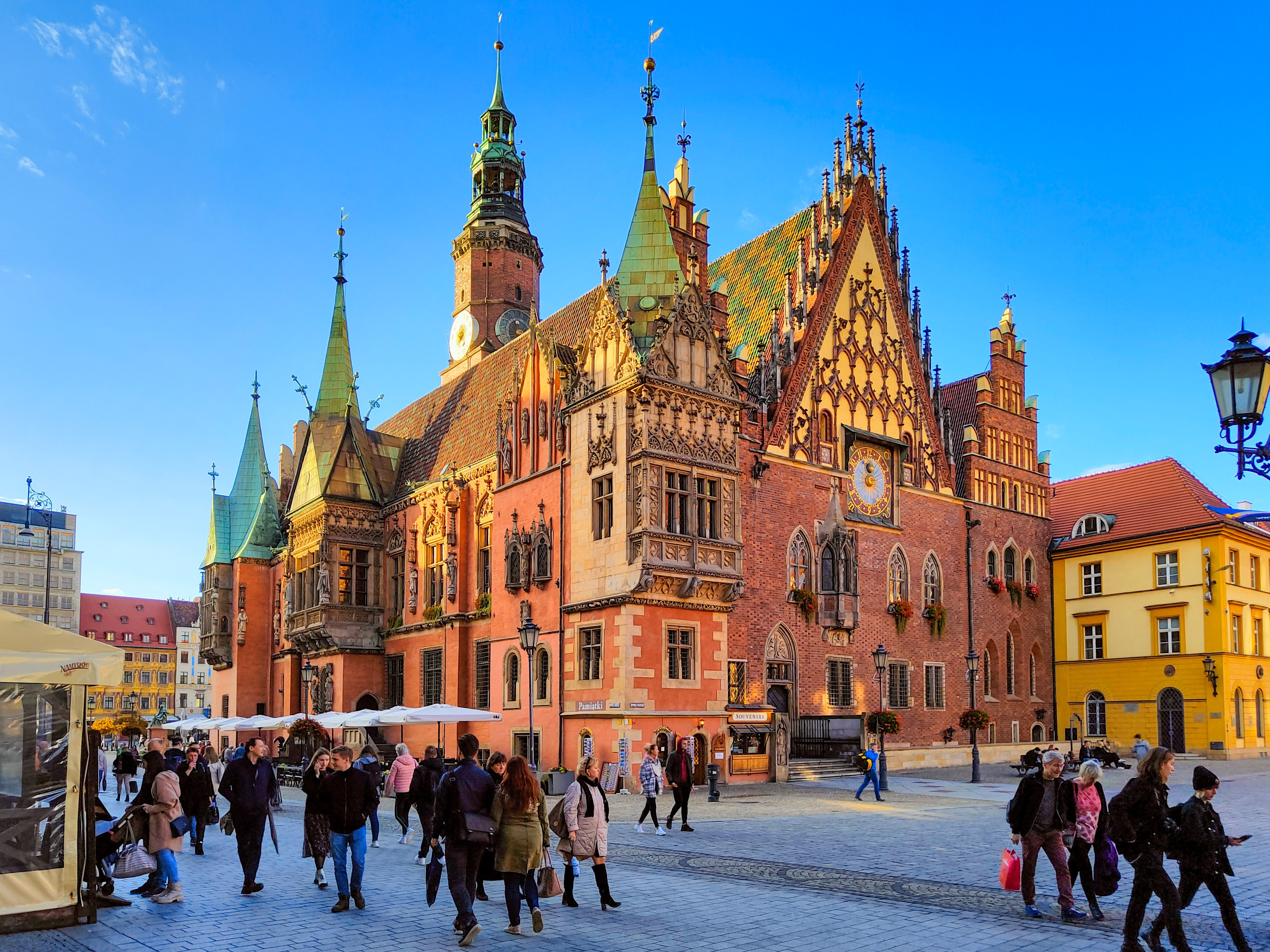
- Wrocław, The Old Town Hall in the Market Square

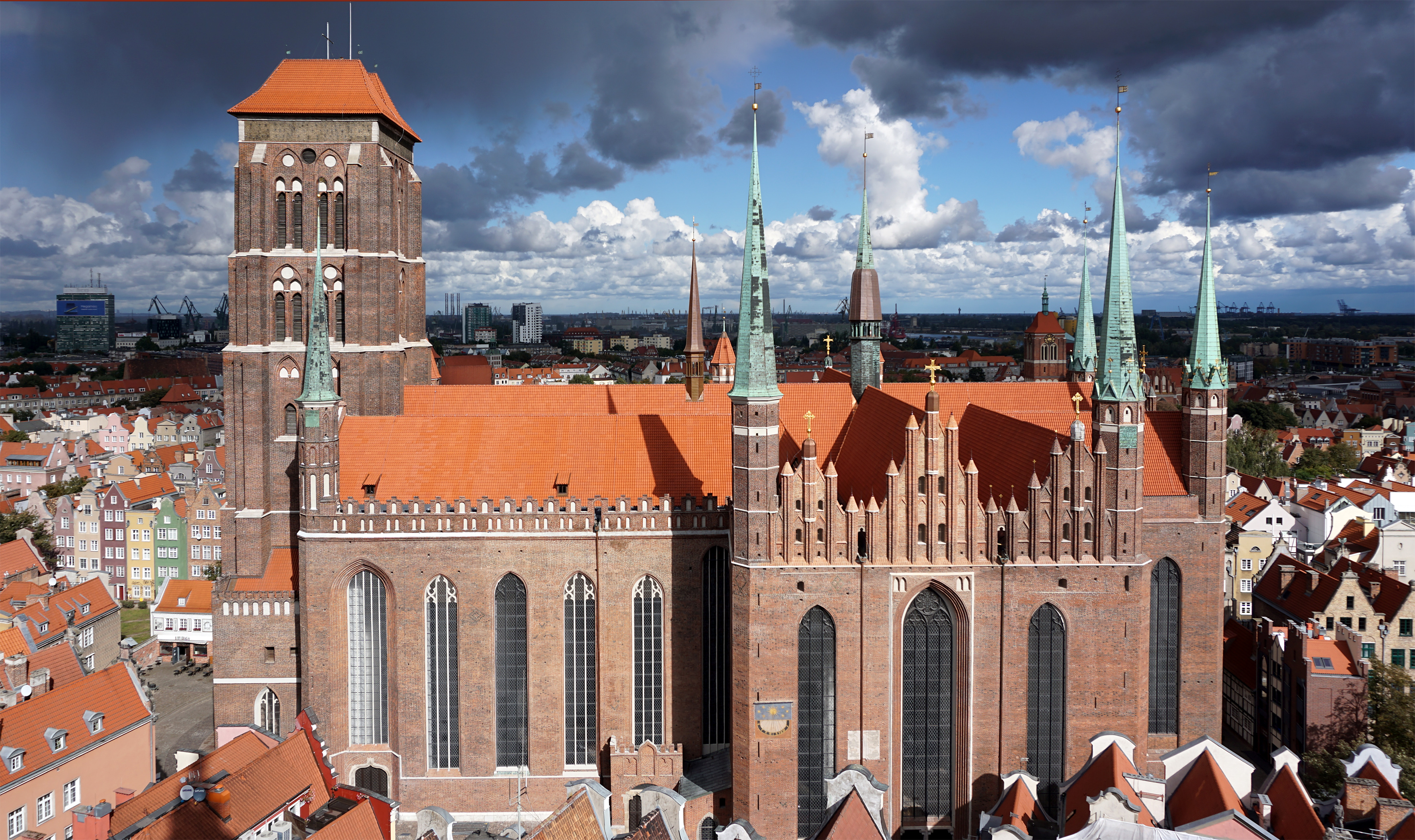
- Gdańsk, St. Mary's Church

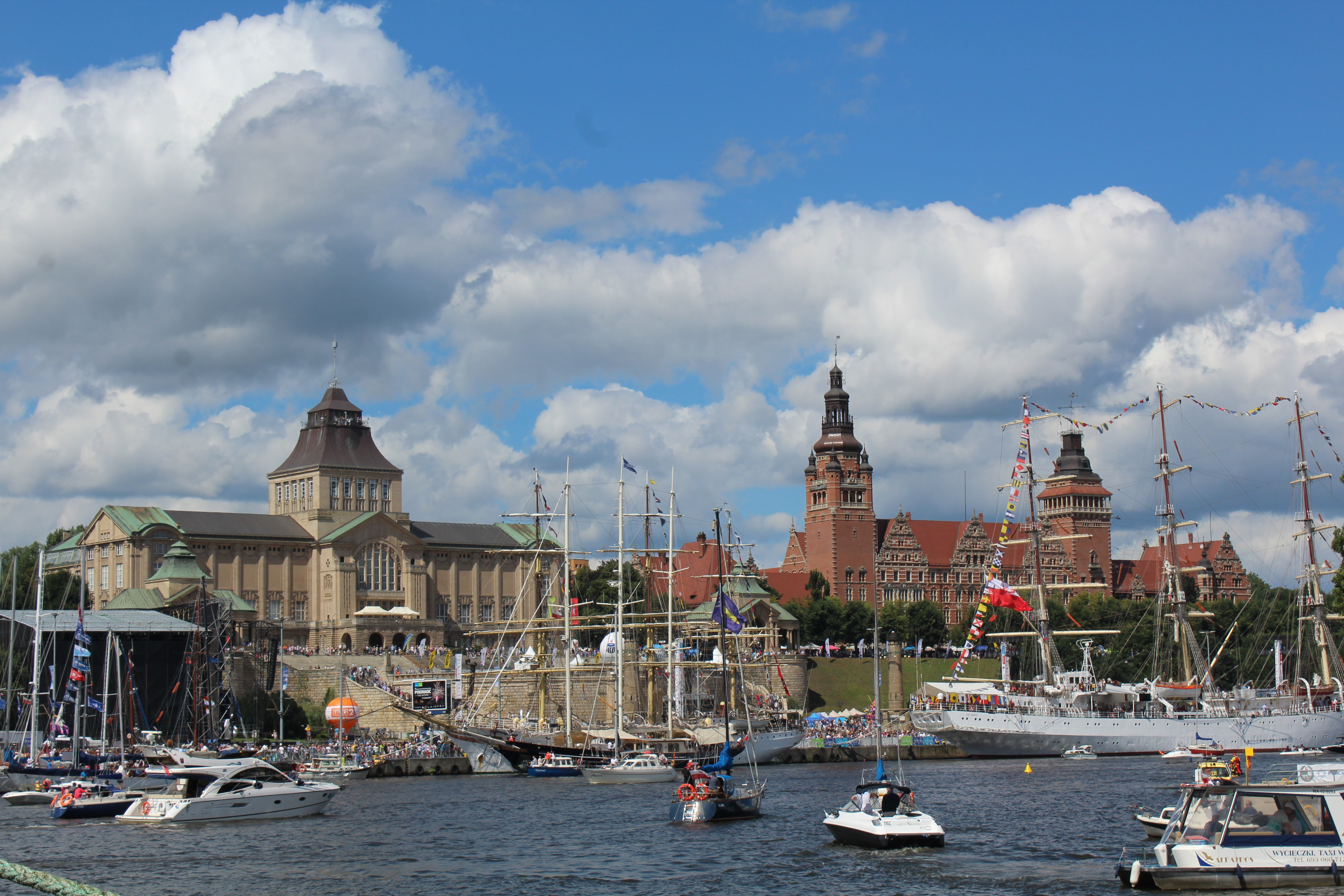
- Szczecin, Szczecin's waterfront

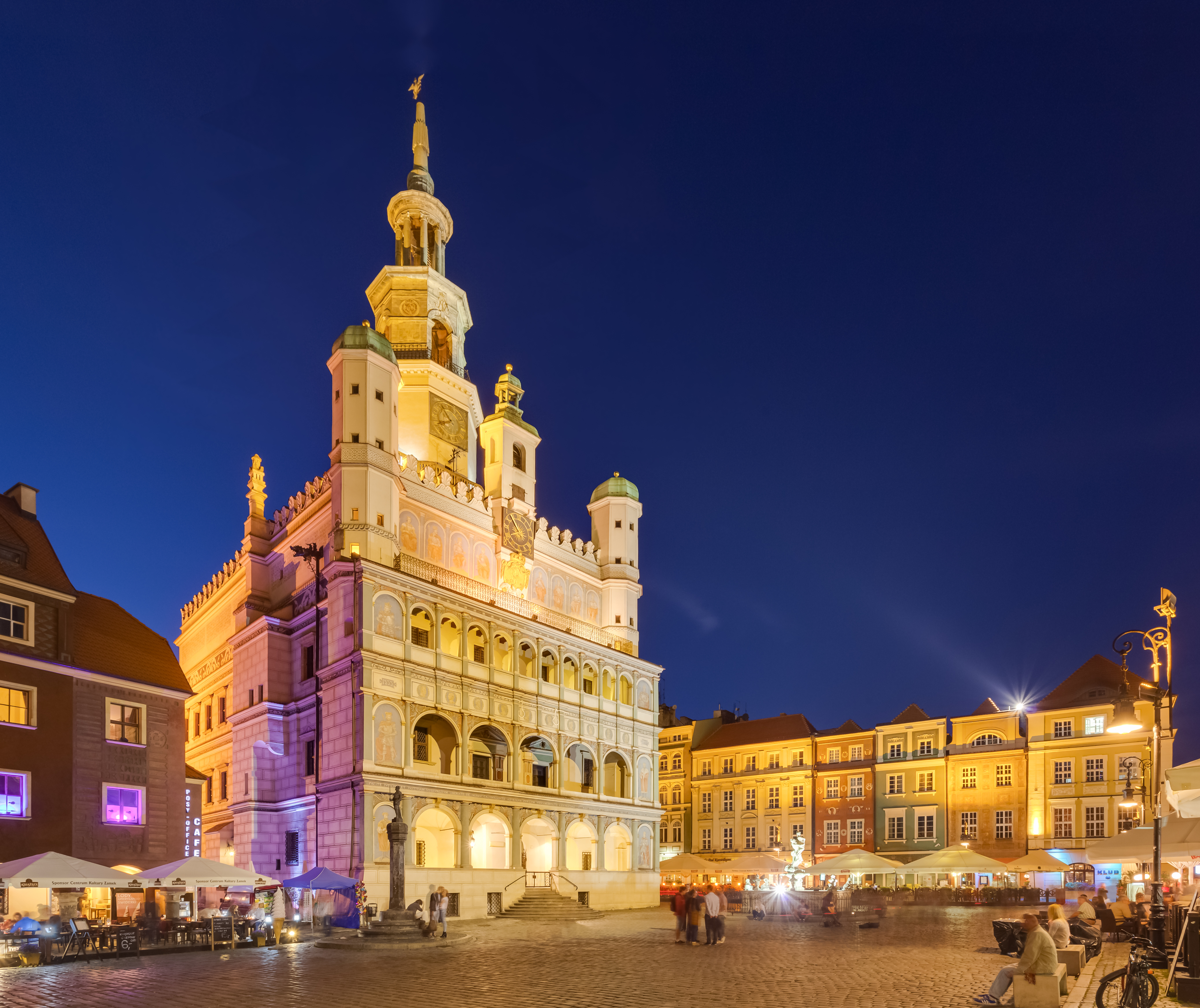
- Poznań, Poznań Market Square at night

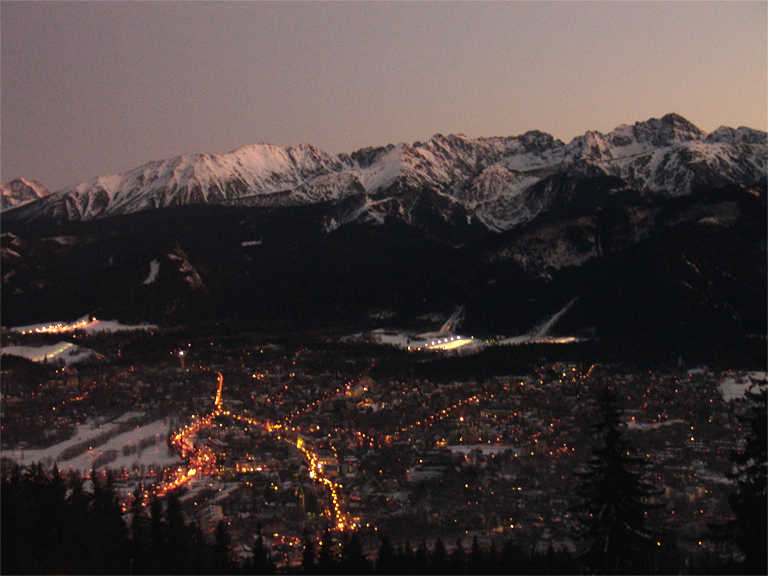
- Zakopane, the Winter Capital of Poland, view from Gubałówka in the Tatra Mountains

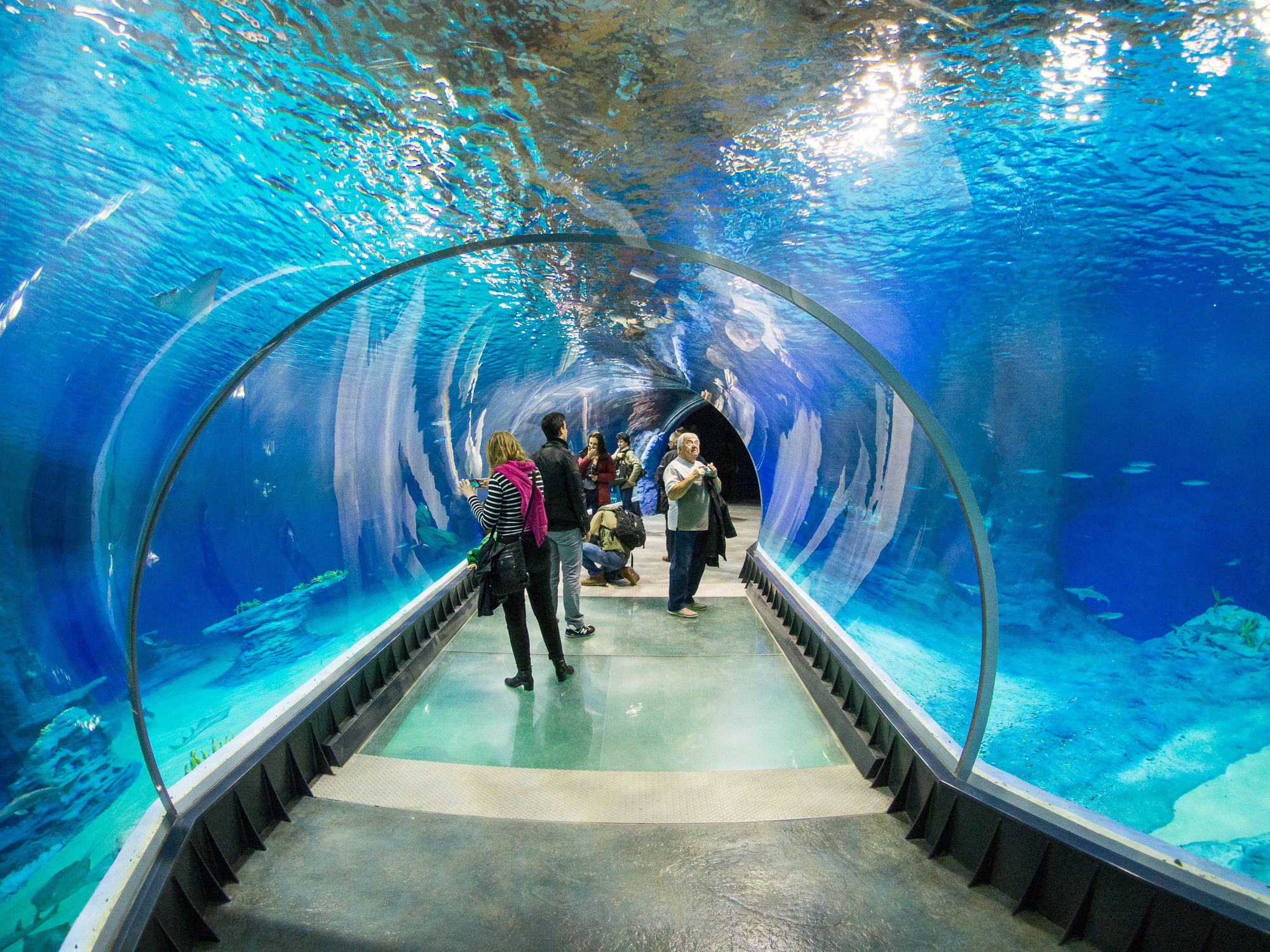
- Wrocław Zoo attracts 1.8 million visitors annually.

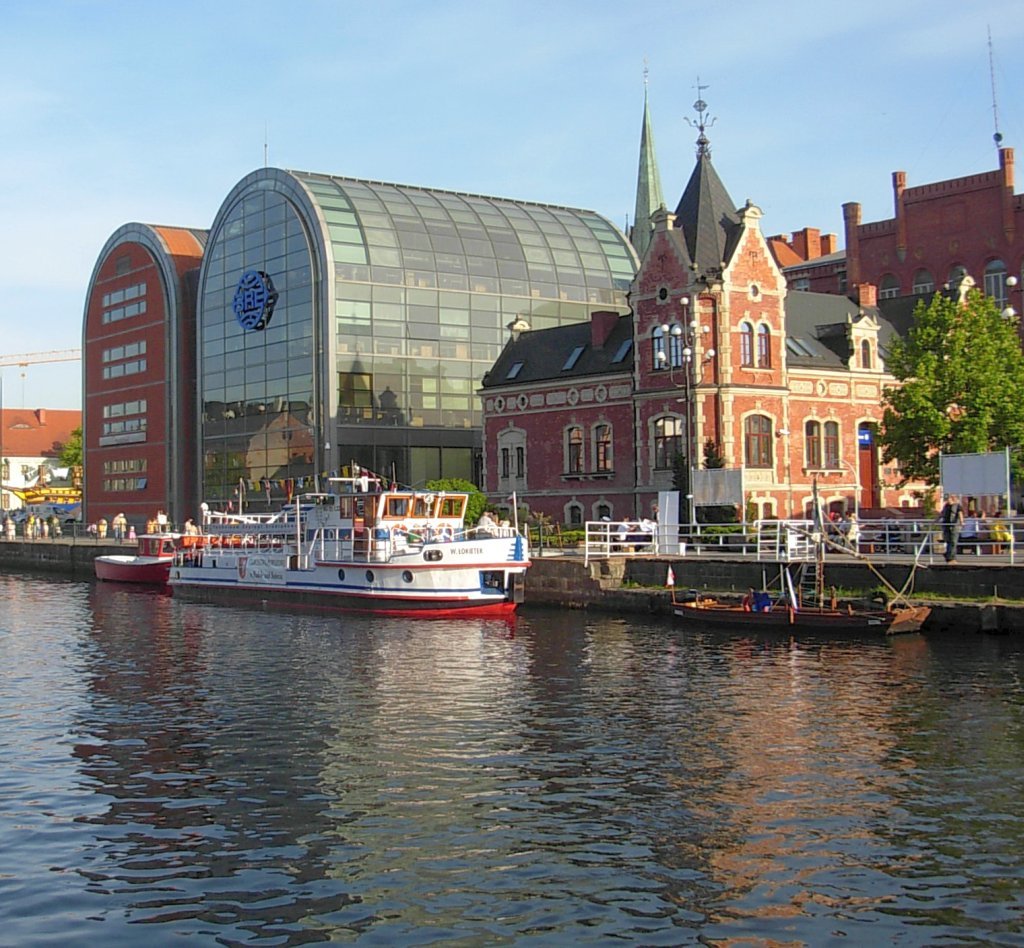
- Bydgoszcz, red-brick Lloyd Palace and marina on the Brda

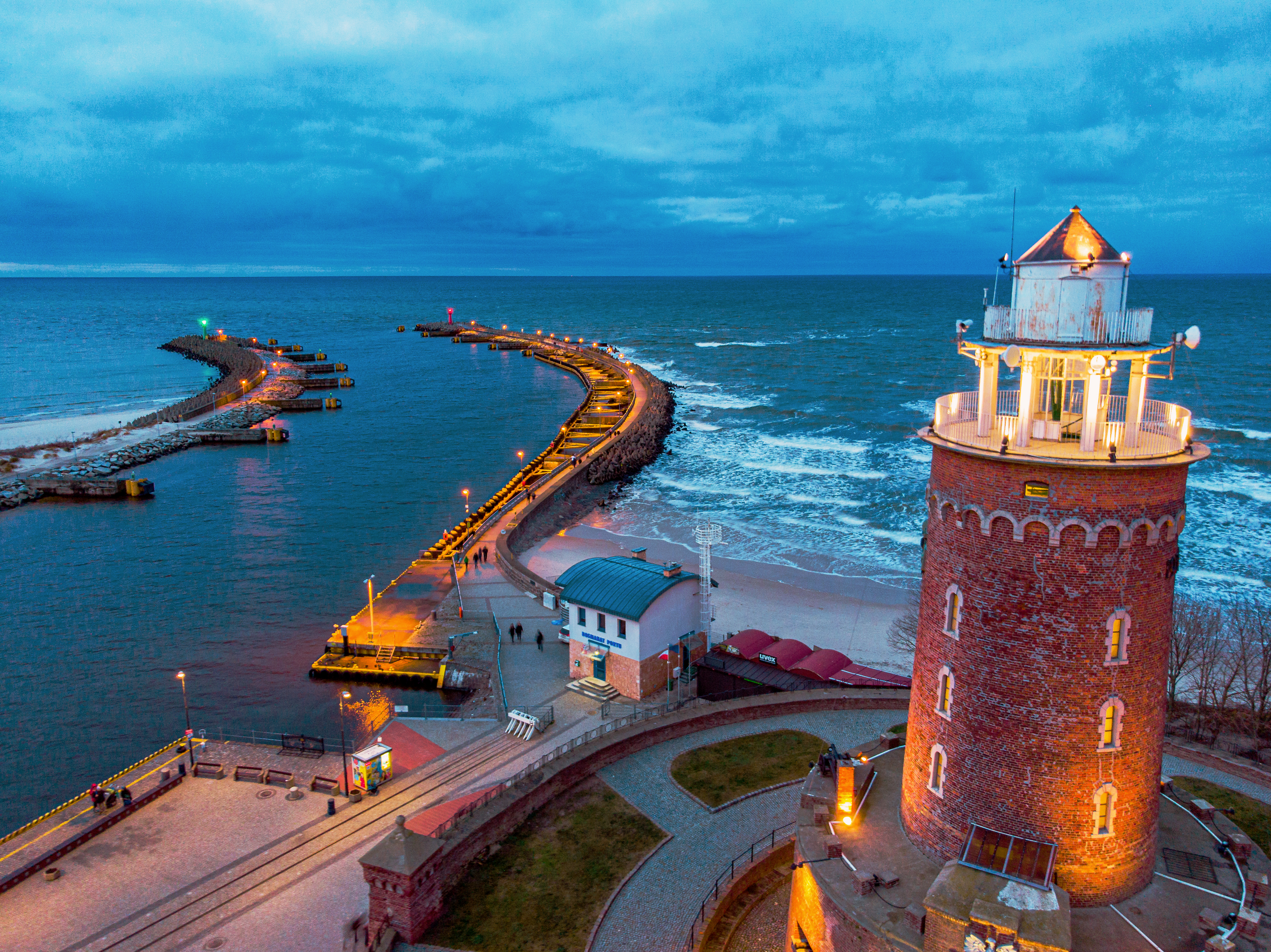
- Kołobrzeg, historic lighthouse restored to its former glory

Tourism in Poland is a relatively small sector of the country's economy. Poland is a growing part of the global tourism market with a steadily increasing number of visitors. The most popular cities are Kraków, Warsaw, Wrocław, Gdańsk, Poznań, Szczecin, Lublin, Toruń, Zakopane, the Salt Mine in Wieliczka and the historic site of Auschwitz – a German Nazi concentration camp in Oświęcim. The best recreational destinations include Poland's Masurian Lake District, Baltic Sea coast, Tatra Mountains (the highest mountain range of Carpathians), Sudetes and Białowieża Forest. Poland's main tourist offers consist of sightseeing within cities, historical monuments, natural monuments, business trips, agrotourism, bicycle touring, qualified tourism, mountain hiking (trekking) and climbing among others.

== Overview ==
Tourist arrivals of 2019 in %

Yearly tourist arrivals in millions

Other Poland's top rating destinations

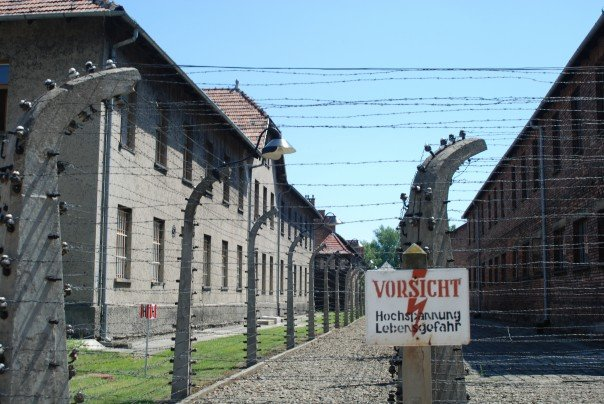
Auschwitz concentration camp, UNESCO World Heritage Site

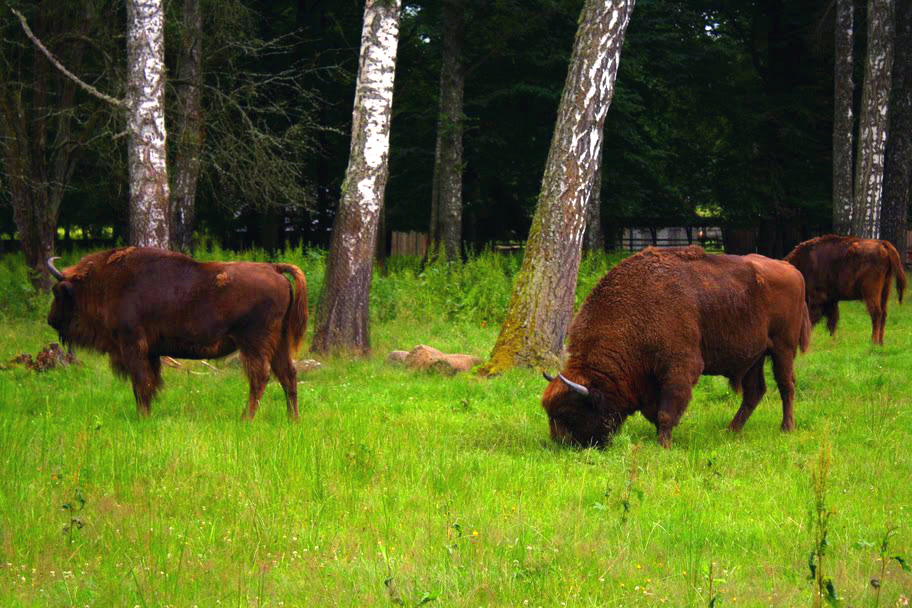
European bison at Białowieża Forest, a UNESCO World Heritage Site and Biosphere Reserve

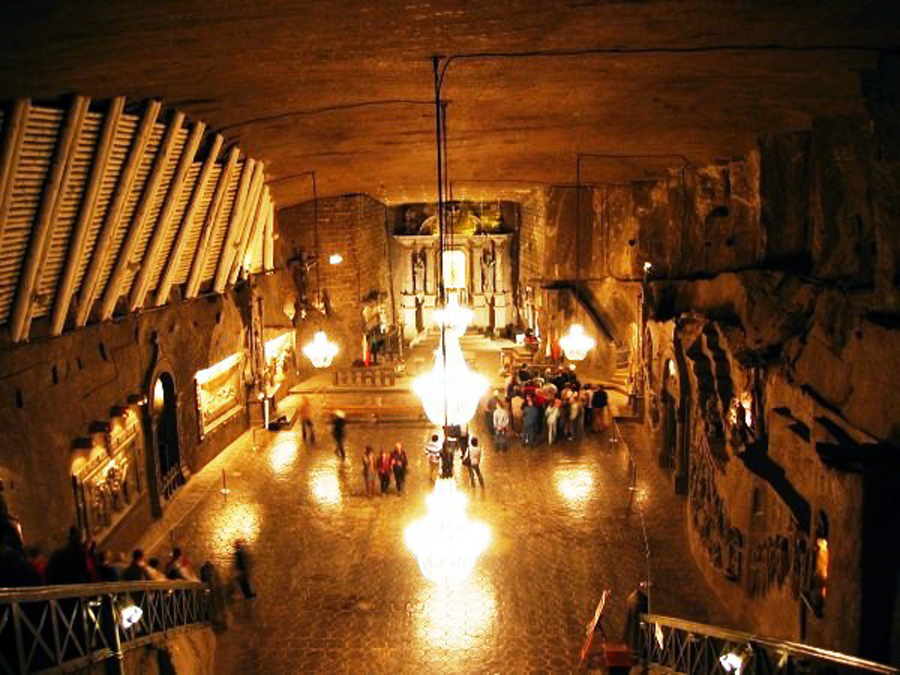
Wieliczka Salt Mine, with 1.2 million visitors annually

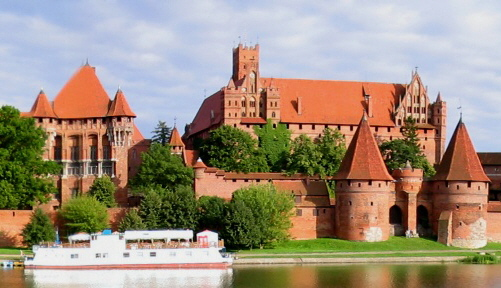
Medieval Malbork Castle in Malbork, northern Poland

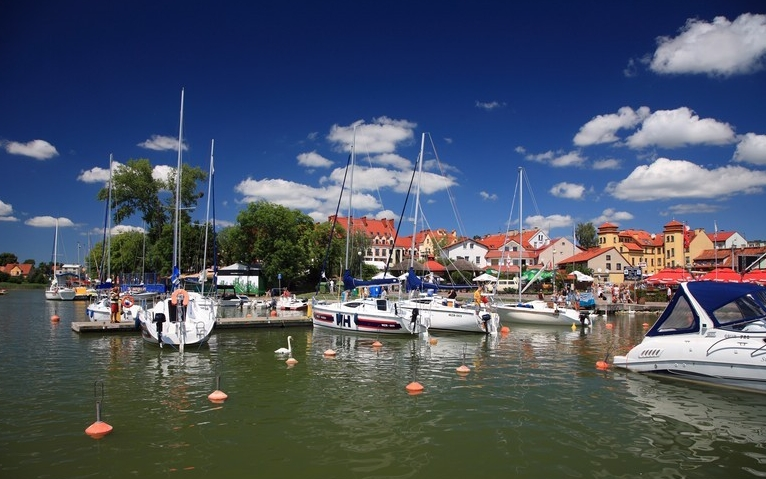
Masurian Lake District, with more than 2,000 lakes. Pictured: marina in Mikołajki resort town

In the 21st century, Poland is one of the safest countries in Europe, frequently visited by tourists.

Poland, especially after joining the European Union in 2004 and acceding to the Schengen Agreement in 2007, became a place frequently visited by tourists. Most tourist attractions in Poland are connected with natural environment, historic sites and cultural events.

According to Tourist Institute's data, Poland was visited by 15.7 million tourists in 2006, and by 15 million tourists in 2007, out of the number of arrivals 66.2 million. In 2012, Poland was visited by 13.5 million foreign tourists (those who came during Euro 2012, but did not stay overnight, were not included in official statistics). In 2013, Poland was visited by 15.8 million tourists. In 2016, the number of arrivals to Poland amounted to 80.5 million. 17.5 million of this number are arrivals considered for tourism purposes (with at least one night's stay). In 2019, Poland was visited by 21.4 million tourists, making it the 18th most visited country in the world.

== History ==
The first Polish tourists were pilgrims traveling to shrines both within Poland and abroad. The development of commercial tourism began in the 19th century. The most popular regions were mountains, especially the Tatra Mountains, explored for example by Tytus Chałubiński. In 1873, the Polish Tatra Society and in 1909 the Polish Sightseeing Society were established to organize and develop tourism. The 19th century was also the time of the rapid appearance of spa resorts, mostly in Sudetes, Beskids and along the Baltic Sea coast, with some of them associated, since 1910, with the Polish Balneology Association. After Poland regained independence in 1918, Polish tourism boomed, and was encouraged by the government. The first professional Polish tour operator, Orbis, was founded in Lwów in 1923, followed in 1937 by Gromada tourist organization and tour operator.

After World War II all tourist organizations were nationalized by the new communist government. The Polish Tatra Society and Polish Sightseeing Society were combined into Polish Tourism-Sightseeing Society (PTTK) and most of the tourist infrastructure was handed over to the newly created Workers Vacations Fund (FWP). Tourism was limited to the Comecon countries. This was the era of governmentally-founded tourism, characterised by mass but low-standard tourism. A typical sight was a holiday campground with small bungalows managed by one of the state-owned companies. Holidays for children and teenagers were organized by Juventur.

After the fall of communism much of the infrastructure was privatized, although many company-owned resorts were downgraded because of their unprofitability. The early 1990s saw the foundation of many new tour operators. Some of them prevailed and strengthened their position on the market, being able to compete with multinational tour operators.

== Natural environment ==
Poland has a diversified natural environment, which is relatively unaffected by human development. There are 23 national parks in the country that meet the criteria of the IUCN. Visitors are attracted by mountains, sea-coast with wide sandy beaches, and forests, lakes, rivers. Among the most popular destinations are: Tatra Mountains, with the highest peak of Poland (Rysy) and the famous Orla Perć (old trail in the style of via ferrata); Sudetes with Main Sudetes Trail (440 km from Świeradów Zdrój to Prudnik), Karkonosze, Table Mountains, Owl Mountains; Białowieża Forest, Lower Silesian Wilderness, Bieszczady, Dunajec River Gorge in Pieniny, Pojezierze Mazurskie and many others.

== Popular tourist destinations ==
- The Royal Road of Kraków
- Tourist attractions in Warsaw
- Wrocław Zoo (most frequently visited attraction in Poland)
- Hunting on the Wrocław's dwarfs
- Wrocław Old Town including Ostrów Tumski with Wrocław Cathedral; Market Square with Wrocław Old City Hall; Centennial Hall, Wrocław Opera
- Old Town in Gdańsk
- Modernist Center of Gdynia
- The Royal-Imperial Route in Poznań
- Jewish Heritage Trail in Bialystok
- European Route of Brick Gothic
- Białowieża National Park
- Dunajec River Gorge
- Tatra Mountains
- Karkonosze Mountains
- Kraków Old Town
- Auschwitz-Birkenau State Museum
- Krasiński Palace
- 13th century Wieliczka Salt Mine
- Medieval Town of Toruń
- Old City of Zamość
- Wilanów Palace
- Jasna Góra Monastery in Częstochowa
- Cistercian Lubiąż Abbey
- Cistercian Krzeszów Abbey
- Royal Gniezno Cathedral
- Wooden Churches of Southern Little Poland
- Wooden Churches of Peace in Jawor and Świdnica
- Sanctuary in Kalwaria Zebrzydowska
- Poznań Old Town and its Ostrów Tumski, Poznań
- Mount Ślęża in the Sudetes
- Kłodzko Fortress complex
- Pszczyna Palace
- Augustów Canal with sluices
- Benedictine Abbey in Tyniec
- Muskau Park shared with Germany
- Palace on the Isle
- Frombork Cathedral
- Łańcut Palace
- Kozłówka Palace
- Historic town of Sandomierz
- Kazimierz Dolny
- National Museum in Warsaw
- Seaside resort of Sopot
- Branicki Palace
- Historic town of Kłodzko
- Elbląg Canal
- Spa town of Kudowa-Zdrój
- Palace of the Kraków Bishops in Kielce
- Historic town of Wadowice
- Czartoryski Museum
- National Museum in Wrocław
- National Museum in Poznań
- Święta Lipka Basilica
- Historical town of Przemyśl
- Seaside resort of Kołobrzeg
- Juliusz Słowacki Theatre
- Ląd Abbey
- Historic town of Jelenia Góra
- Zakopane; known as "the winter capital of Poland"
- Spa town of Karpacz
- Royal Baths Park
- Collegiate Church of St. Mary and St. Alexius in Tum
- Pławniowice Palace
- Project Riese
- Wolf's Lair

=== Castles ===
- Wawel Royal Castle
- Royal Castle in Warsaw
- Niedzica Castle
- Malbork Castle
- Baranów Sandomierski Castle
- Książ Castle
- Nowy Wiśnicz Castle
- Czocha Castle
- Moszna Castle
- Ujazdowski Castle
- Imperial Castle, Poznań
- Grodziec Castle
- Krasiczyn Castle
- Pieskowa Skała
- Lidzbark Warmiński Castle
- Kwidzyn Castle
- Gołuchów Castle
- Kliczków Castle
- Golub-Dobrzyń Castle
- Krzyżtopór
- Ogrodzieniec Castle
- Rzeszów Castle
- Dunajec river castles
- Chojnik Castle
- Kórnik Castle
- Bobolice Castle
- Będzin Castle
- Pomeranian Dukes' Castle, Szczecin
- Bytów Castle
- Tenczyn Castle
- Bolków Castle
- Czersk Castle
- Ciechanów Castle
- Lublin Castle
- Uniejów Castle
- Darłowo Castle
- Bielsko-Biała Museum and Castle
- Sanok Castle
- Dzików Castle

== Cultural events ==
Warsaw

- International Frederick Chopin Piano Competition
- Warsaw Autumn Music Festival
- Warsaw International Film Festival
- Jazz Jamboree
- Orange Warsaw Festival
- Ursynalia – Warsaw Student Festival
- Festival of Jewish Culture in Warsaw
- Warsaw Jewish Film Festival
- Warsaw Comic Con
- Parada Równości

Kraków

- Live Music Festival
- Kraków Film Festival
- Jewish Culture Festival in Kraków
- Conrad Festival
- Floating of the Wreaths (Wianki)
- Kraków Szopka Nativity Crèche Festival
- International Film Festival Etiuda&Anima
- International Festival of Independent Cinema Off Plus Camera
- Kraków Equality March

Wrocław

- Wratislavia Cantans
- New Horizons Film Festival
- Festival of Good Beer
- American Film Festival

Poznań

- ANIMATOR (festival)
- Henryk Wieniawski Violin Competition
- Malta Festival
- Poznań International Fair
- Short Waves Festival
- Off Cinema Film Festival
- Ale Kino! International Young Audience Film Festival

Tricity

- St. Dominic's Fair in Gdańsk
- Sopot International Song Festival
- Open'er Festival in Gdynia
- Gdynia Film Festival
- Gdańsk Shakespeare Festival

Łódź

- Transatlantyk Festival
- International Festival of Comics and Games
- Soundedit Festival
- Łódź Design Festival
- Łódź Biennale

Katowice

- Grzegorz Fitelberg International Competition for Conductors
- Off Festival in Katowice

Other

- Camerimage Film Festival in Toruń
- Pol'and'Rock Festival in Kostrzyn nad Odrą
- National Festival of Polish Song in Opole
- International Cycling Film Festival
- Szczecin Festival of Contemporary Painting
- Two Riversides Film and Art Festival in Kazimierz Dolny

== Tourist resorts ==
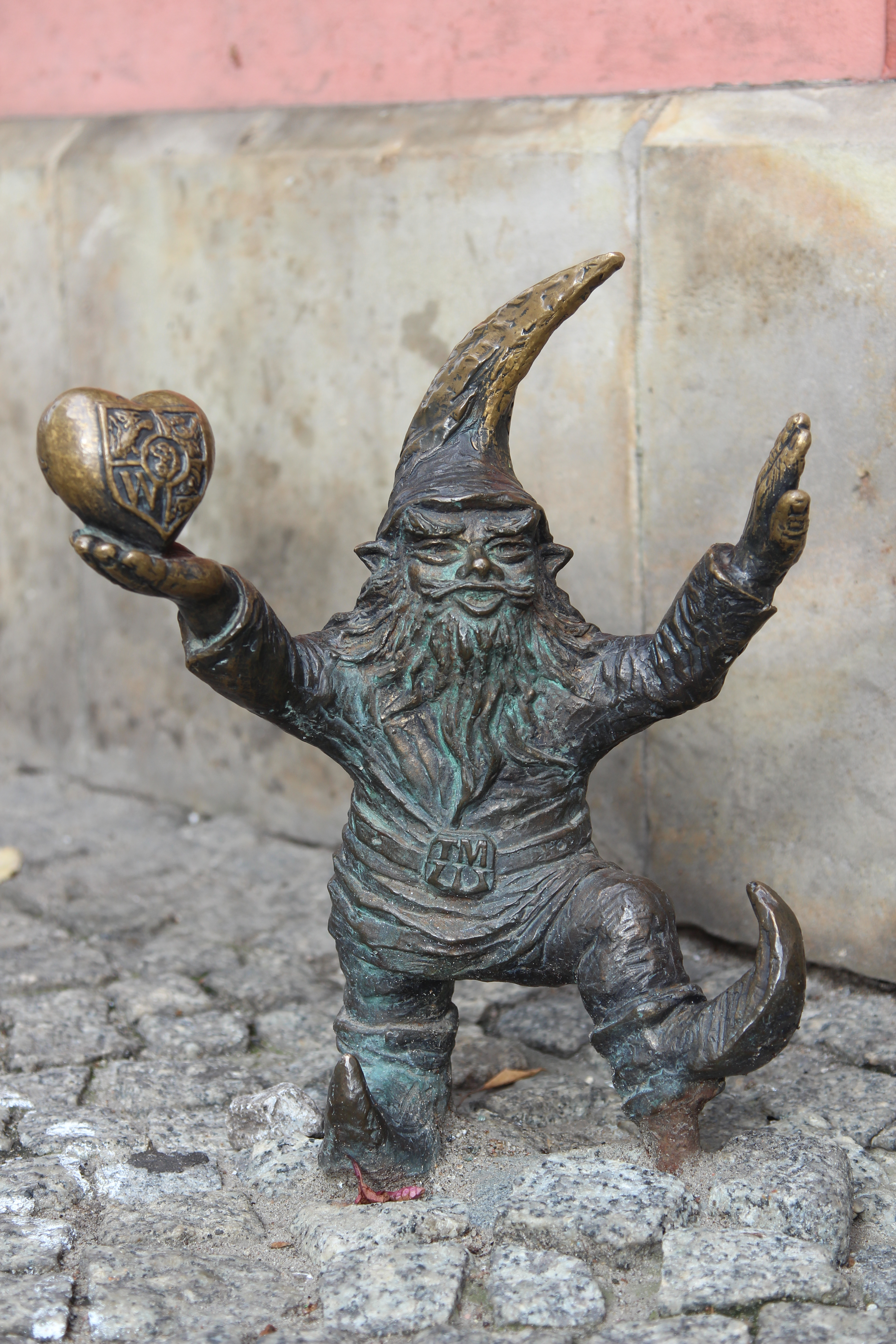
Wrocław's dwarf

There are dozens of sea resorts on the coast of Baltic Sea like Wolin Island, located close to the German border and the coast of Pomerania. In southern Poland there are resorts for skiing and hiking in the Karkonosze mountains, which is part of the Sudetes mountain range. Karkonosze includes the tourist centres of Karpacz and Szklarska Poręba. Other famous resorts for skiing and hiking include in Carpathian Mountains: Zakopane in the Tatra Mountains; Szczyrk, Krynica-Zdrój, Ustroń, Wisła in the Beskids or Szczawnica and Krościenko in Pieniny mountains.

In the vicinity of Low Beskids lies a tourist resort that offers a blend of mountainous terrain and an aqueous environment, with Lake Rożnów in the centre.

== Christian pilgrimage ==
It's estimated that 13% (of the 1.8 million in 2005) of visitors of the Basilica of Our Lady of Licheń arrive from abroad. Jasna Góra Monastery was visited by 3.6 million of pilgrims from 78 countries in 2014.

== Transport in Poland ==
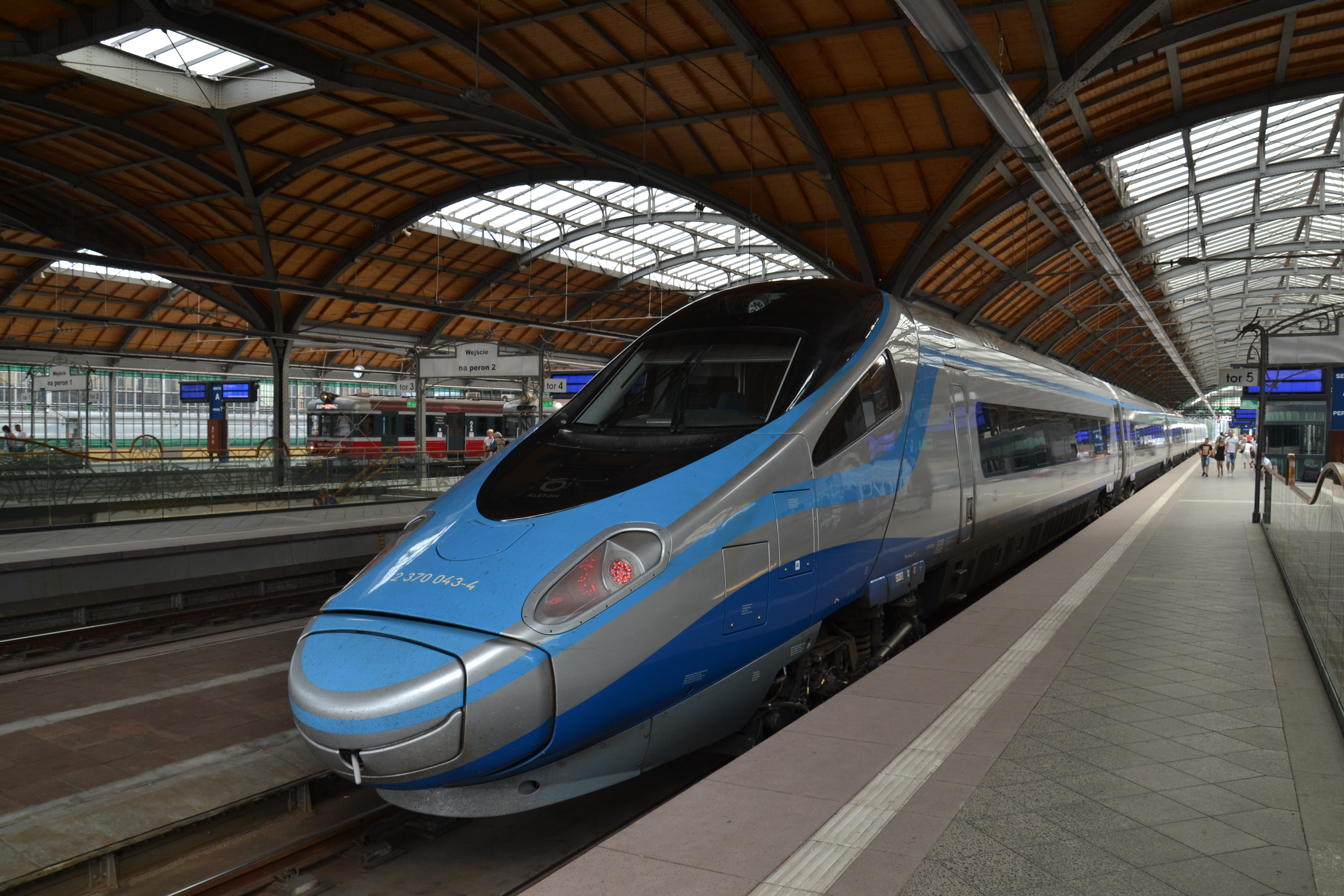
Pendolino ED250, Wroclaw Main Station

Tourist infrastructure and facilities are abundant, especially in larger cities and in popular tourist resorts. In large Polish cities, urban public transport is very well developed.

Poland has 15 international airports with a rich network of connections to many European cities. The largest airports are Warsaw Chopin Airport (the main hub of LOT Polish Airlines), Kraków John Paul II International Airport, Gdańsk Lech Wałęsa Airport, Katowice Airport, Wrocław Airport.

Intercity connections are offered by PKP Intercity, Polregio, Arriva RP, Leo Express, RegioJet, regional trains (Lower Silesian Railways, Silesian Railways, Lesser Poland Railways, Szybka Kolej Miejska, Pomeranian Metropolitan Railway, Masovian Railways, Łódź Agglomeration Railway, Greater Poland Railways) and PKS's and many bus companies. There are also coach connections to other countries provided by various companies.

Connections by ferry to Sweden and Denmark through the Baltic Sea are for example from Gdańsk, Gdynia and Świnoujście (POLSCA Baltic Ferries).

== See also ==
- Polish Tourist and Sightseeing Society (Polish: Polskie Towarzystwo Turystyczno-Krajoznawcze – PTTK)
- Mountain Volunteer Search and Rescue (Polish: Górskie Ochotnicze Pogotowie Ratunkowe – GOPR)
- Tatra Volunteer Search and Rescue (Polish: Tatrzańskie Ochotnicze Pogotowie Ratunkowe – TOPR)
- Crown of Polish Mountains
- List of spa towns in Poland
