= Gubałówka Hill funicular =

Funicular railway in Zakopane, Poland

Coordinates: 49.3014°N 19.9386°E

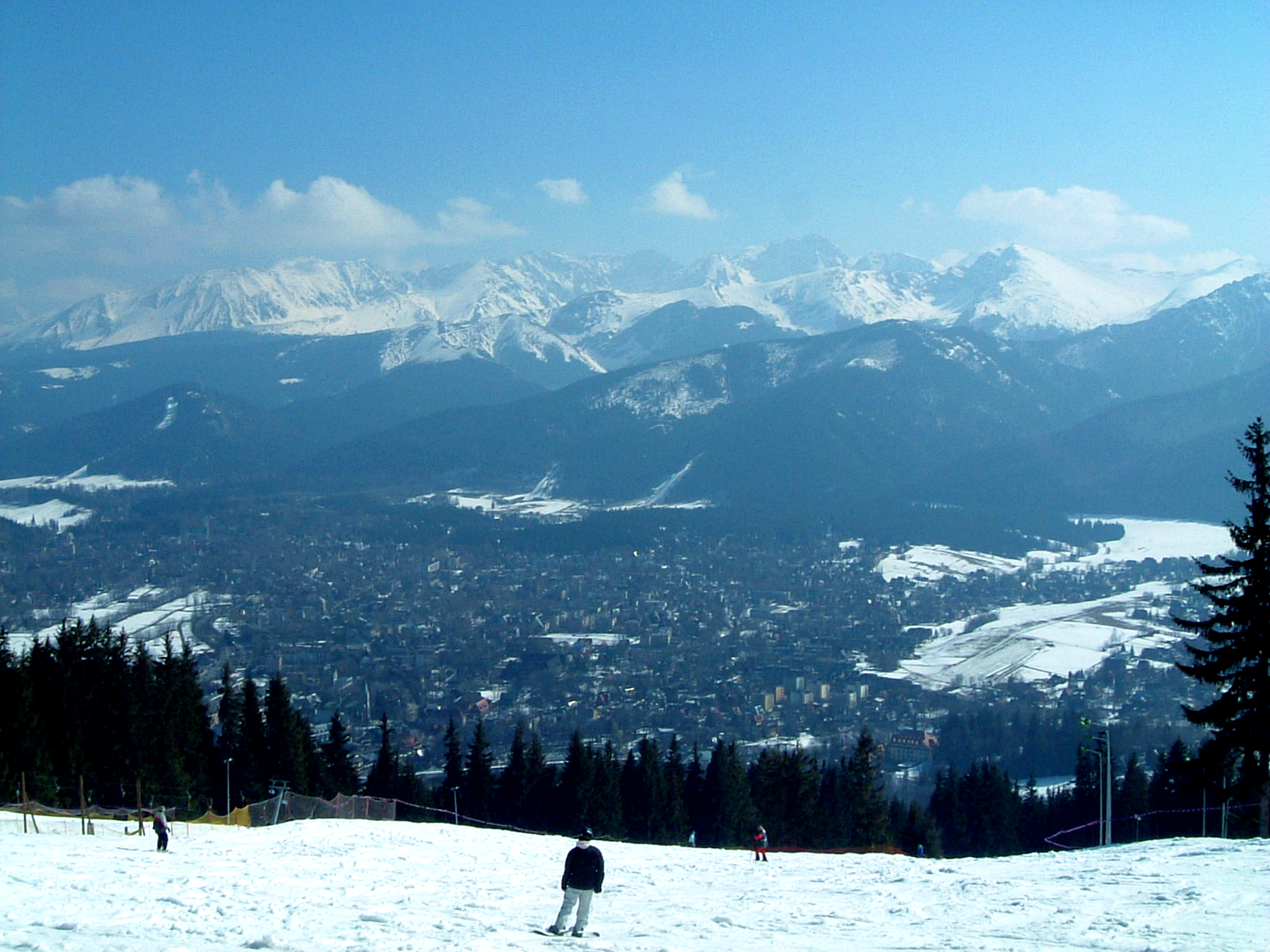
A view of the Tatra Mountains from Gubałówka Hill.

The Gubałówka Hill Funicular is located in Zakopane, Poland and ascends the Gubałówka mountain. It is operated by PKL, Polish Cable Lines or Polskie Koleje Linowe.

== Description ==
As in all funiculars, on the Gubałówka, a continuous steel cable is attached to a pair of tram-like carriages set at a steep angle on narrow gauge rails. These two carriages travel up and down the steep mountain slope, the ascending and descending vehicles counterbalancing each other in turn. The line is single, apart from one automatically controlled passing place situated roughly halfway up. The cable runs between the rails, guided by numerous roller wheels. Street style lighting is provided along the whole length of the line.

An overbridge carries a ski-run over the line, otherwise the route is uninterrupted, a single station being present at either end. The standard return fare is 22.00 Zł.

== The area ==
Gubałówka (1,120 m or 3,675 ft) is a mountain above the Polish town of Zakopane and it is a popular tourist attraction, offering commanding views of the Tatra Mountains across the valley below. The large numbers of visitors (around three million per year), especially in the winter months, inspired the venture, opened in 1938, and the line remains popular, having been rebuilt in 2001 with new carriages and stations.

== Views on the Gubałówka ==
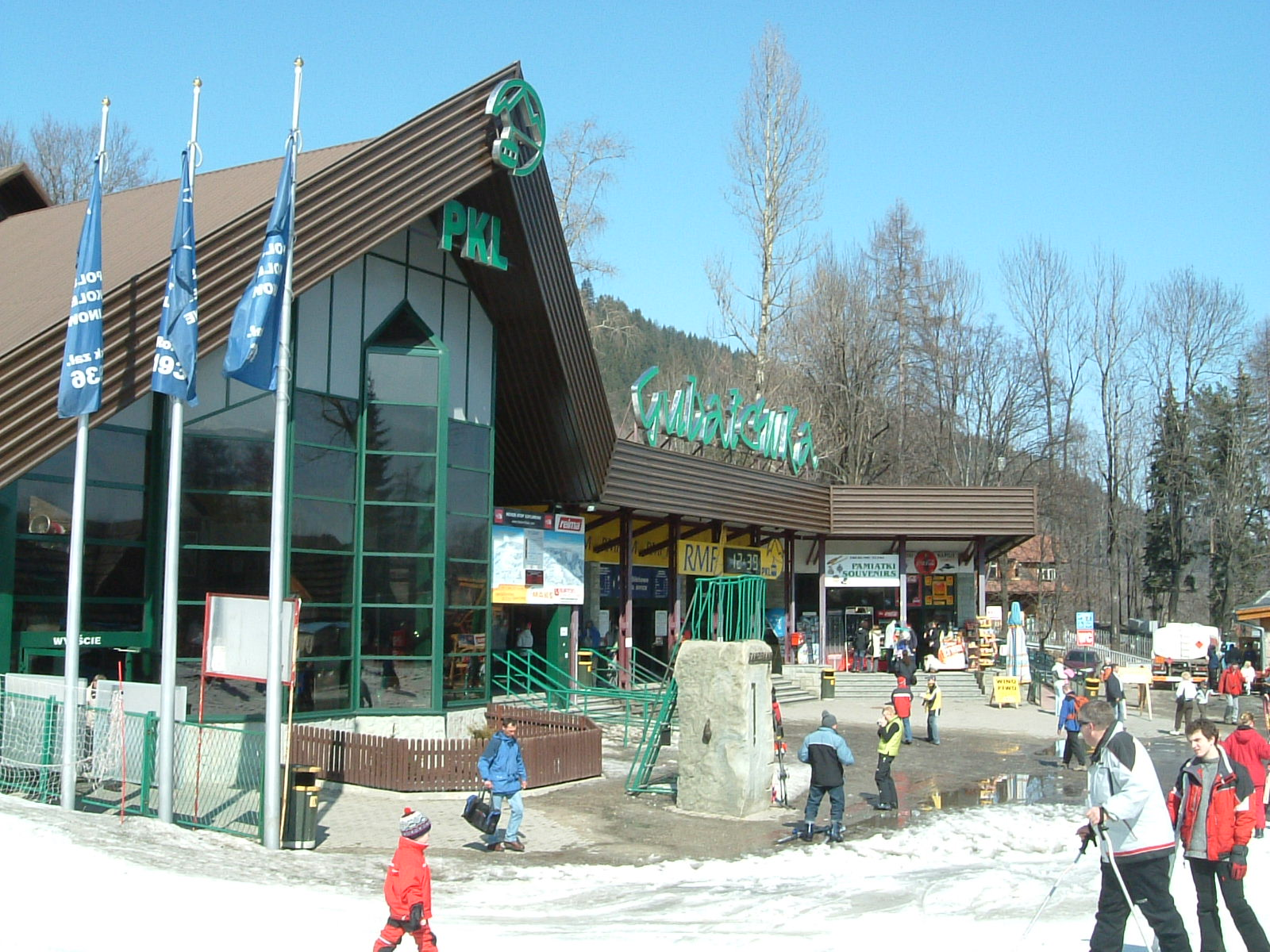
The base station in Zakopane facing the traditional market area

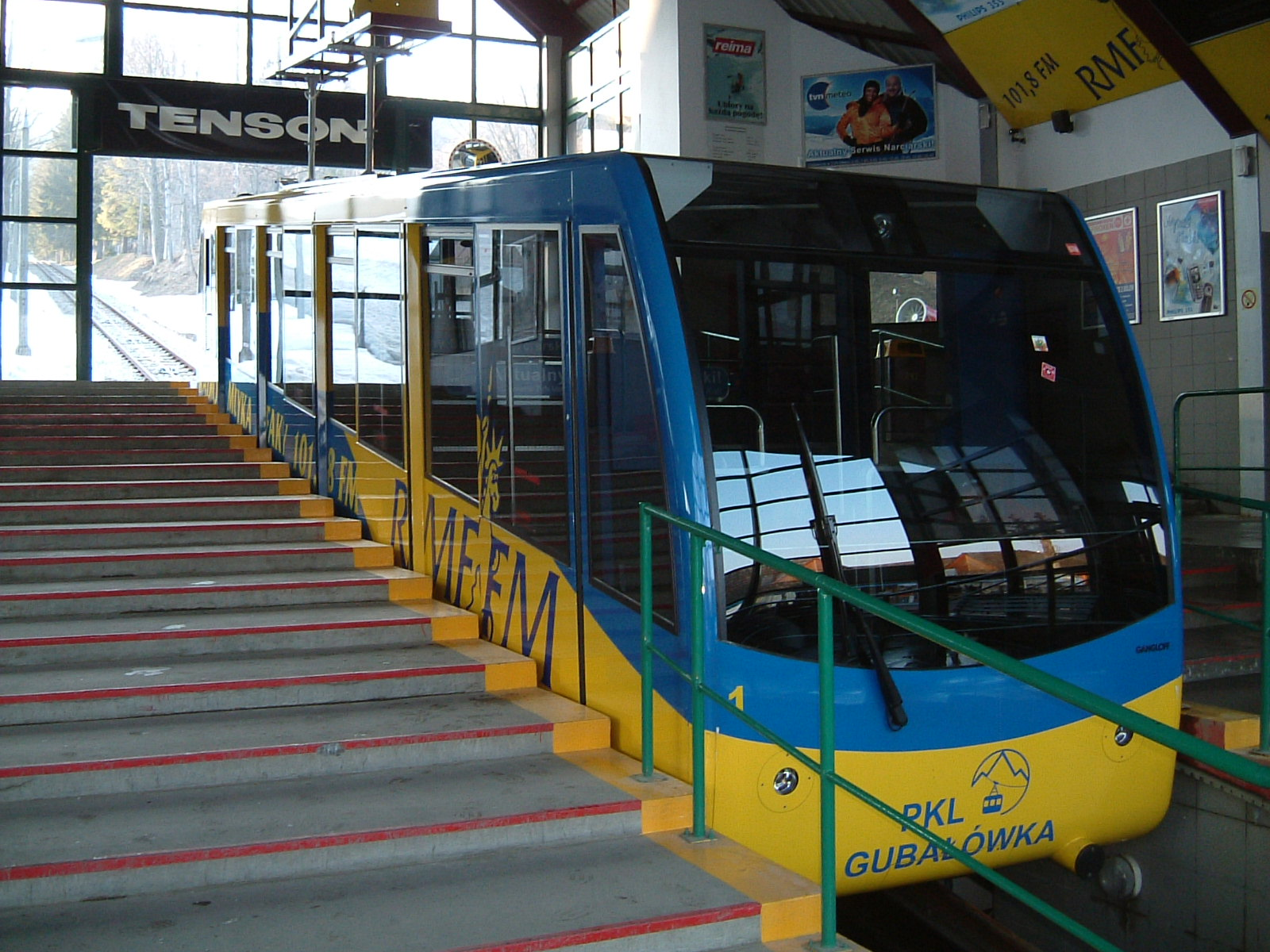
One of the passenger carriages at the base station

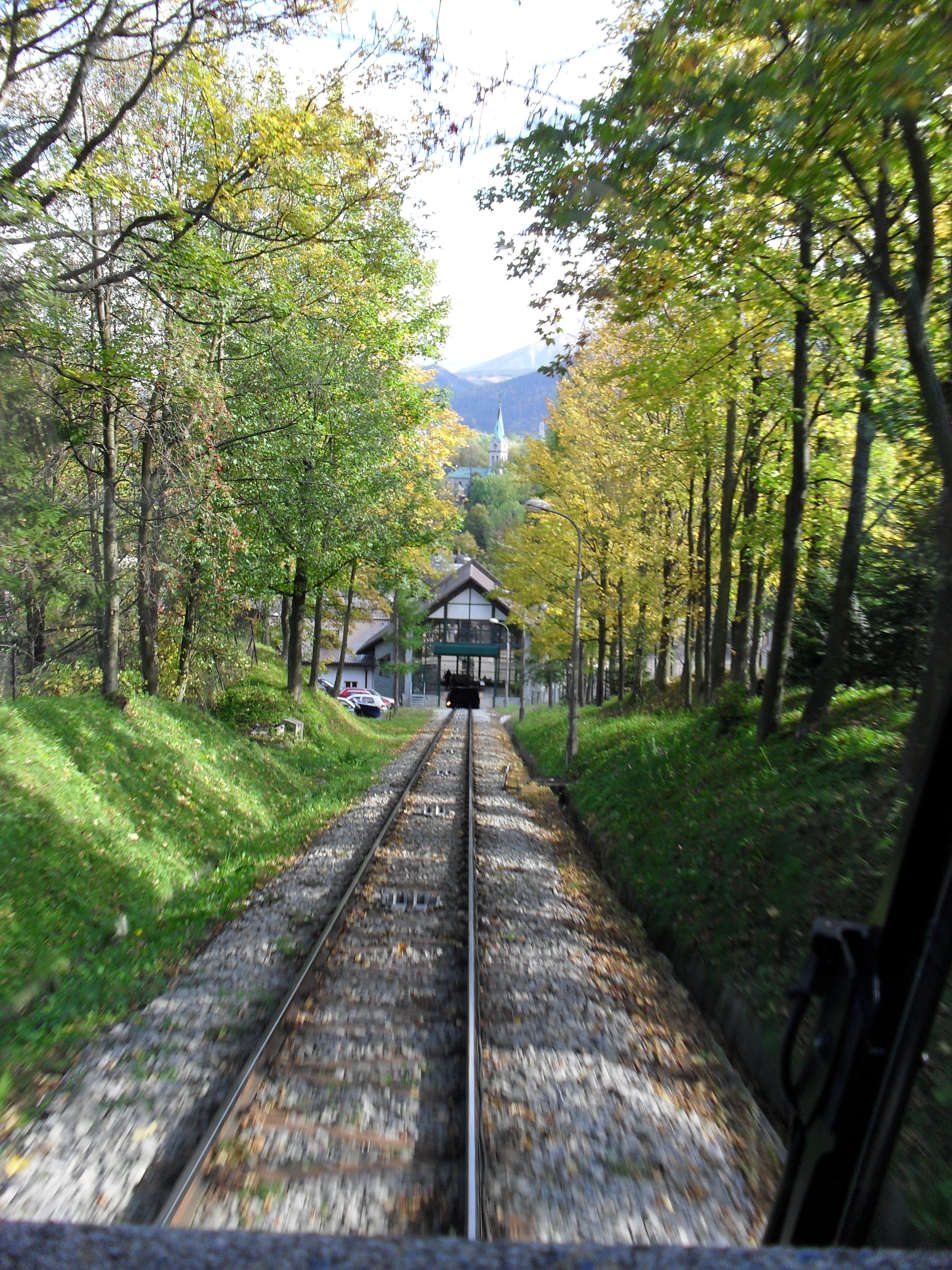
A view looking down to the base station

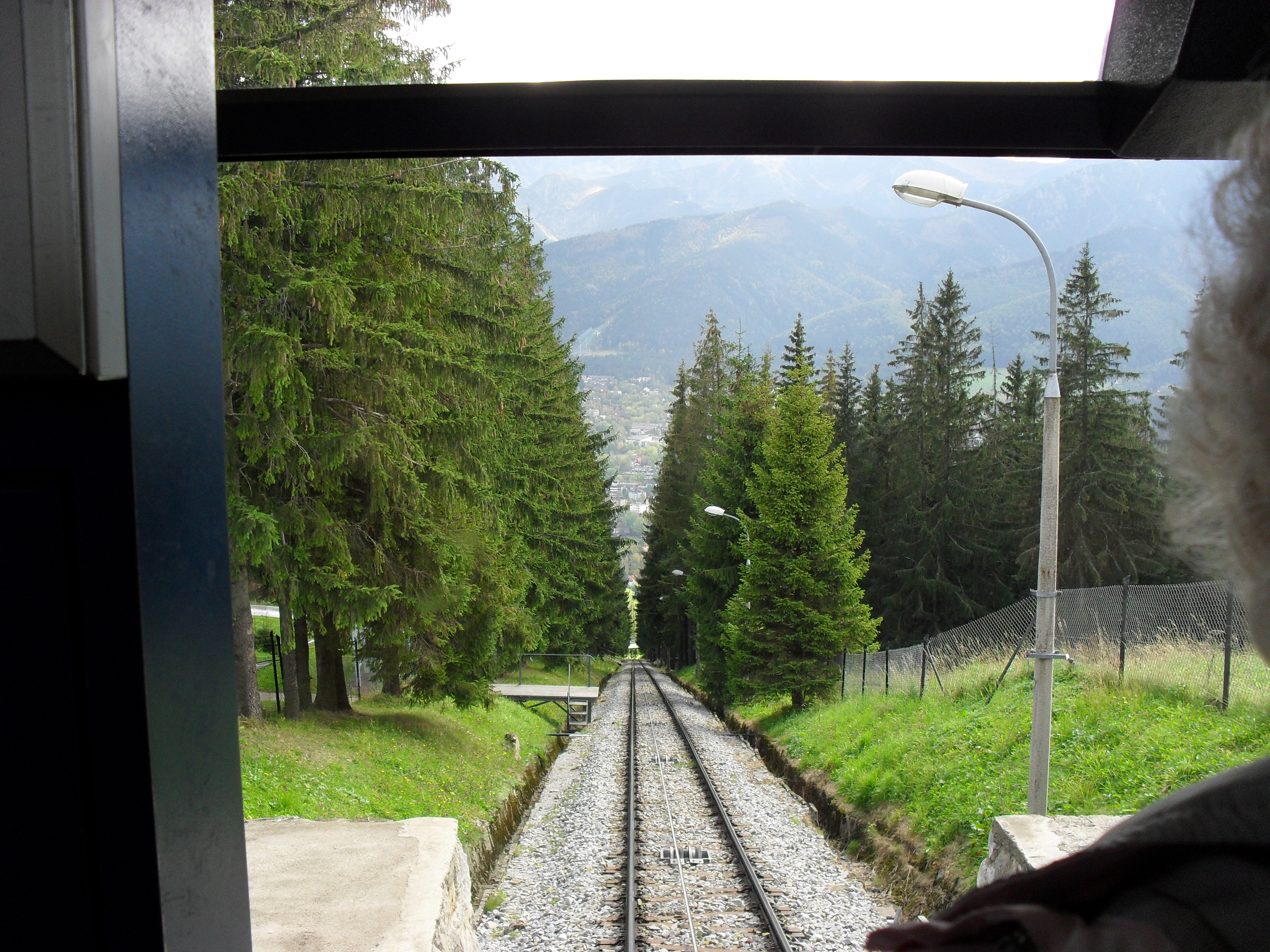
Entering the mountain station with a distant view of the ski-run overbridge

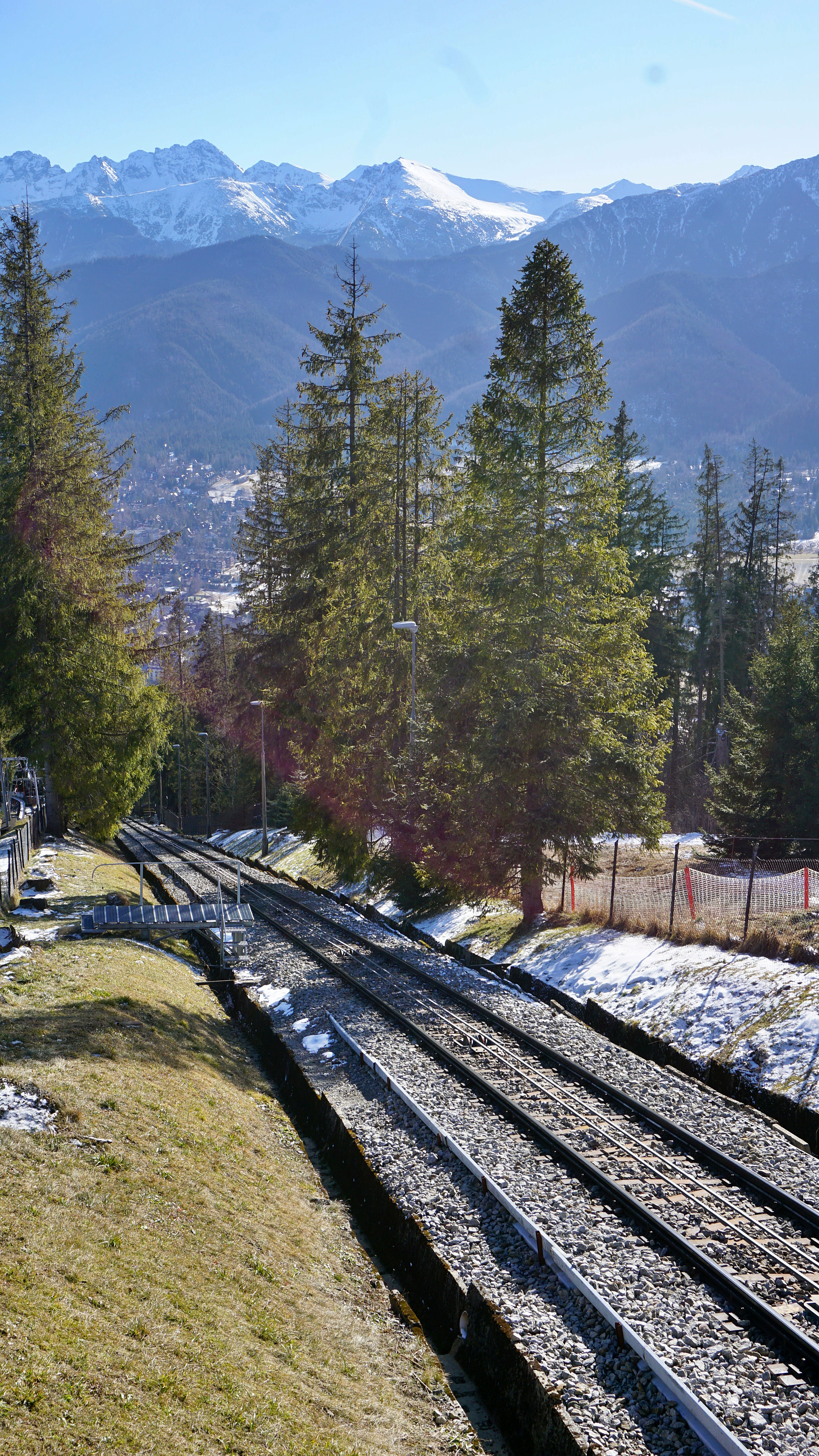
View from the top

Funiculars are also present in Krynica, the Góra Parkowa which was opened in 1937 and at Międzybrodzie Żywieckie, the Góra Żar, opened 2003. The Międzybrodzie Żywieckie Funicular re-used the rolling stock of Gubałówka Hill Funicular released by 2001 upgrade of the latter.

== See also ==
- List of funicular railways
