= Zakopane-Gubałówka transmitter =

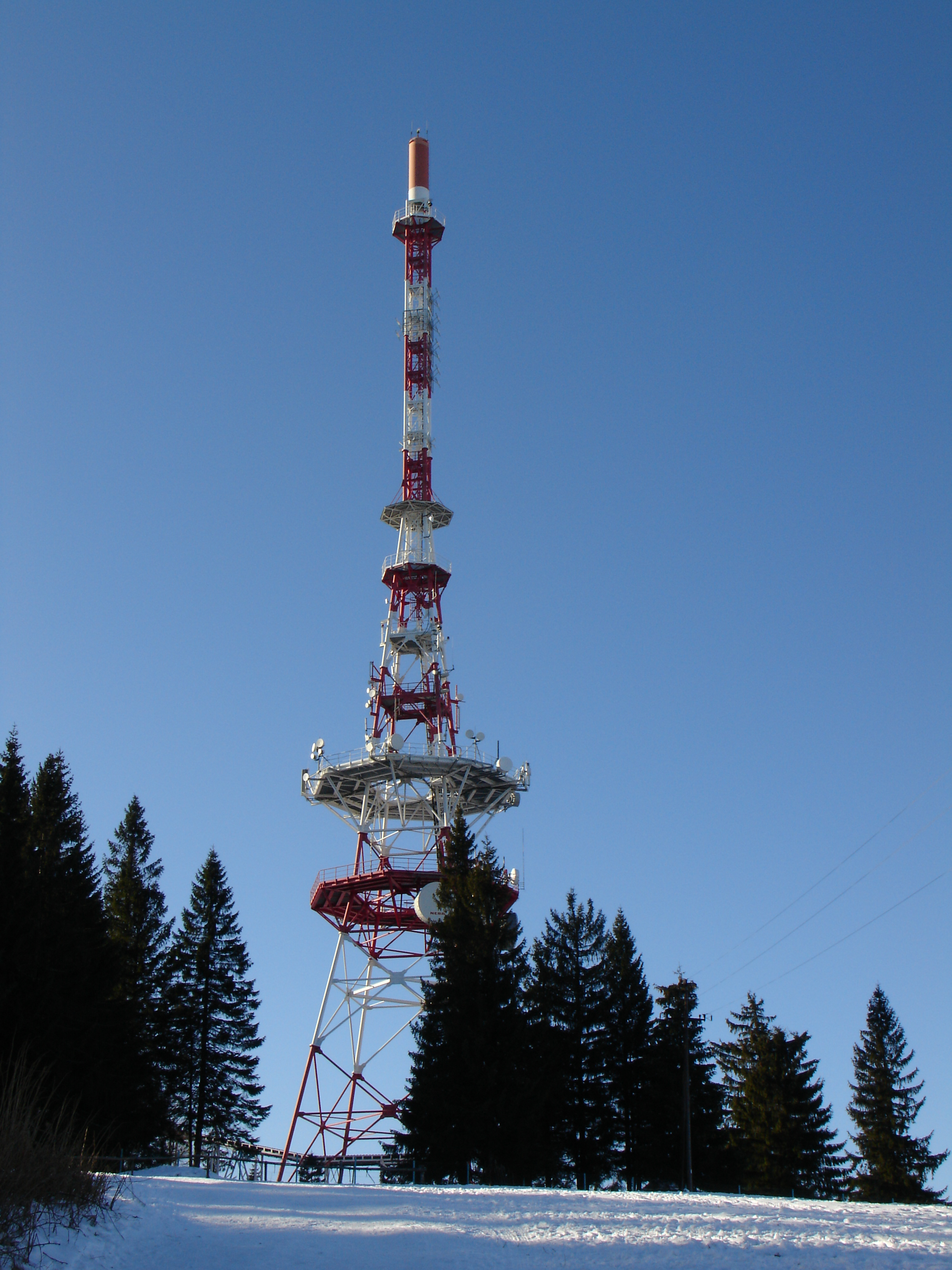
Zakopane-Gubałówka transmitter

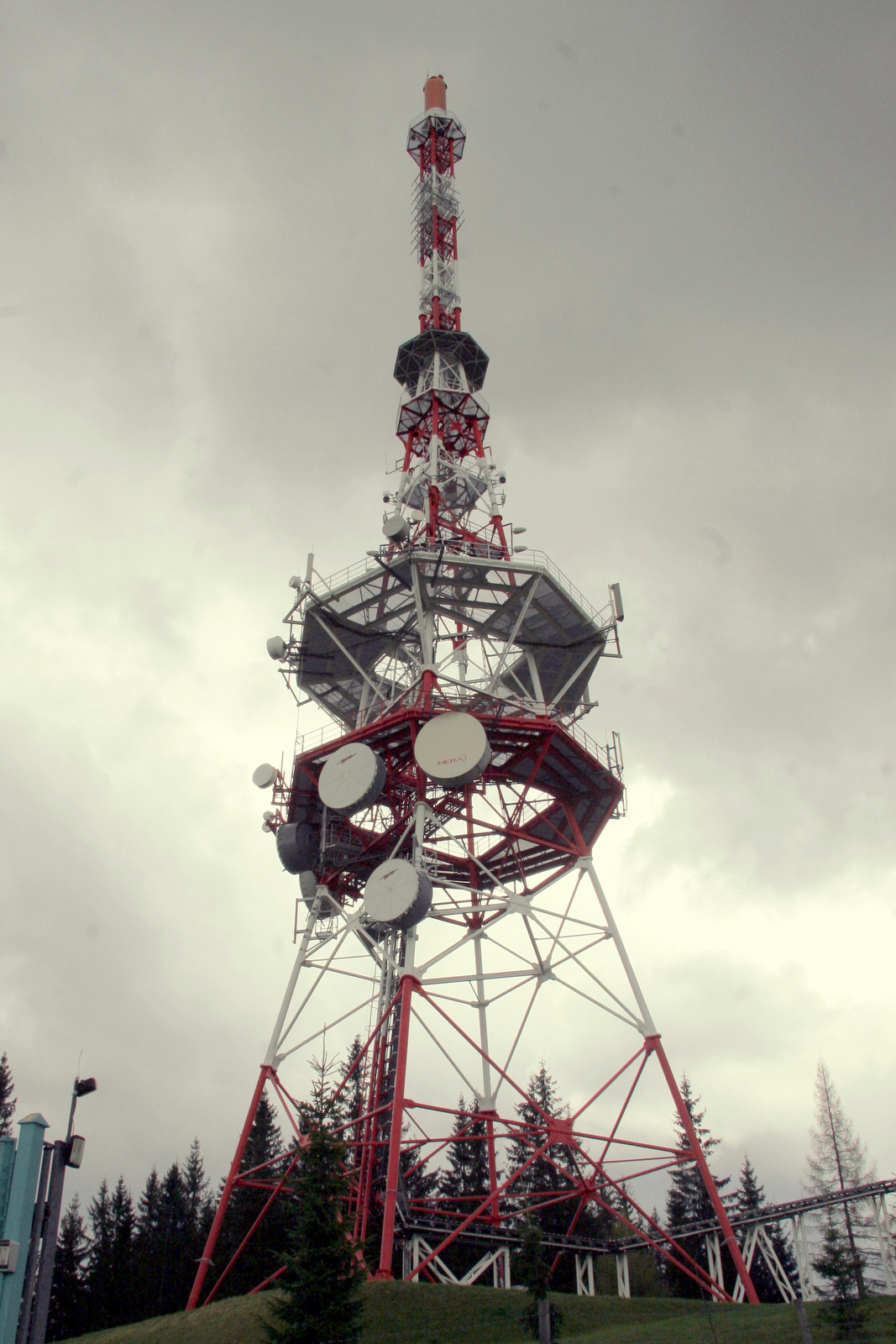
Viewed from below

The Zakopane-Gubałówka transmitter (Polish designation: RTON Gubałówka) is a facility for FM and TV transmission on the Gubałówka mountain at Zakopane, Poland. The Zakopane-Gubałówka transmitter uses a 102-metre-high (335 ft) free-standing lattice tower located at 49°18′25″N 19°56′25″E. It is situated at 1,122 metres above sea level.

== Transmitted programs ==
=== Radio ===
Program	Frequency	Transmission Power	Polarisation
Polskie Radio Program 1	90.9 MHz	0.3 kW	vertical
Polskie Radio Program 2	92.8 MHz	10 kW	horizontal
Polskie Radio Trójka	98.2 MHz	10 kW	horizontal
Radio Kraków	100.0 MHz	10 kW	horizontal
Radio RMF FM	101.8 MHz	10 kW	horizontal
Radio Zet	106.3 MHz	10 kW	horizontal
Radio VOX FM Kraków	107.9 MHz	0.1 kW	vertical

=== Digital TV (MPEG-4) ===
Multiplex	Frequency	Channel Number	Transmission Power
MUX 1	650 MHz	43	20 kW
MUX 2	794 MHz	61	20 kW
MUX 3	578 MHz	34	20 kW
