= Grodzka Gate – NN Theatre =

Cultural institution in Lublin, Poland

Grodzka Gate – NN Theatre Centre
- Ośrodek "Brama Grodzka – Teatr NN"
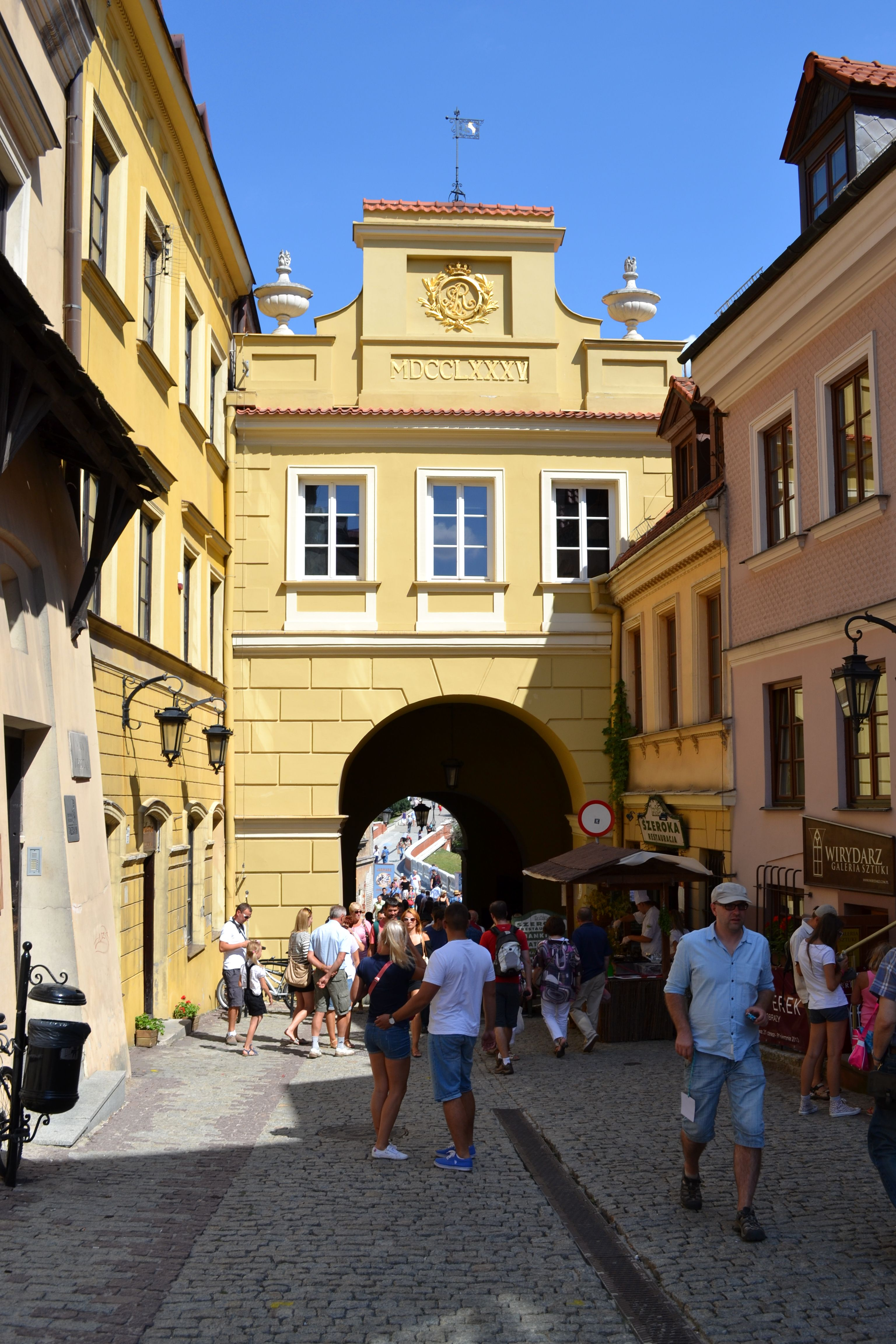
- Predecessor: NN Theatre
- Location(s): Grodzka street, 21; 20-112 Lublin, Poland
- Coordinates: 51°14′58″N 22°34′11″E
- Fields: culture heritage, education
- Director: Tomasz Pietrasiewicz
- Vice director: Witold Dąbrowski
- Website: teatrnn.pl

The Grodzka Gate – NN Theatre Centre (Polish: Ośrodek "Brama Grodzka — Teatr NN") is a cultural institution based in Lublin. It is housed in the Grodzka Gate, also known as the Jewish Gate, which historically used to be a passage from the Christian to the Jewish part of the city. In its activities, the Centre focuses on issues of cultural heritage. The Polish-Jewish past of Lublin is the corner stone of the art and educational programmes carried out by the "Gate".

== History and theatre activities of the centre ==
NN Theater was established in 1990 in the Lublin Drama Group, accommodated at that time in the Grodzka Gate and adjoining buildings. In 1998 the theater became a detached, independent organization and received its current name Ośrodek "Brama Grodzka — Teatr NN".

In its infancy theater staged the plays based on works of Kafka, Hrabal and other authors. As Tomasz Pietrasiewicz explains, the literary adaptation of Herman Melville novel "Moby-Dick" played on the stage in June 1995 became a farewell to a certain period of the producer's theater life. When after a long break he returned to stage direction again, the spotlight shifted to the storytelling.

The centre also organises festivals, such as "Miasto Poezji" (English: "City of Poetry") and "Śladami Singera" (English: "Following I. B. Singer's Traces").

== Expositions in the Grodzka Gate ==
The building of the centre has hosted many expositions, though its structure, characterized by a range of narrow corridors, some dead-end ones, is far from being an idyllic place for a typical exhibition. Thus, their creators had to fit their exhibit items in the space available.

In 2010, with the financial endorsement of the Ministry of Culture and National Heritage of the Republic of Poland, an exposition "Lublin. Pamięć Miejsca" (English: "Lublin. Memory of the Place") was launched and has been operating ever since. It included some objects from the previous display, "Portrait of the Place" and was enriched by some multimedia materials. One of the halls opens to visitors' eyes a "Wall of voices" – boxes with installed speaker system. Pressing on one of the buttons, you can listen to the stories about old Lublin – its smells, tastes, and sounds.

Numerous pieces of Kaiserpanorama, accompanying visitors through the whole course of the exhibition, offer to have a look at pictures of interwar Lublin. In addition, there is a room dedicated to the Holocaust victims with seventy coloured photos of the Lublin ghetto, taken by a German soldier, Max Kirnberger. In 2012, new photos were added to the gallery. They had been found on the roof of the building on Rynek 4 during its renovation. There, under the leads, wrapped in papers and rags, 2,700 photocopies were discovered. The owners of the house handed them over to the "Grodzka Gate" for a period of ten years. Author of the photos is still unknown.

A separate room is devoted to the Righteous Among the Nations from the Lublin region (people who had been rescuing Jews during the Holocaust). It is a place where visitors can read their personal stories and listen to their reminiscences. Another eye-catching item of the exposition is models of the old part of the city in the 1930s – one actual and one multimedia one with replicas of 840 buildings, such as townhouses, shops, synagogues, etc.

== Historical and educational activities ==
Jews who come here ask us: why do you do this? After all, you are not Jews, but Poles, and a Jewish town is not your history.

Poles ask us: Why do you do this? After all, you are Poles, and Jewish town is not our history. Maybe you are Jewish?

We patiently explain that it is our common, Polish-Jewish history. To remember the killed Jews, you don’t have to be a Jew as well.

There must be more such gates in the world we live in. Not only Polish-Jewish ones.

=== "Poemat o Miejscu" ===
Jewish district had existed around Lublin Castle since the late 14th century, until it was laid waste by the Nazi in November 1943 after the liquidation of the Lublin ghetto. Nowadays, a bus station and lanes occupy its place, whereas the main street of the Jewish district – Szeroka – gave way to an asphalted parking lot.

Hence, to prevent from oblivion of the memory of Jewish life that existed there, the centre organizes the mystery of memory «Poemat o Miejscu» (English: "Poem of the Place"). The event took place at night time in March 2002 and 2004. At the site of the whole former Lublin Ghetto lights go down, creating a striking contrast with other parts of the city humming with life and pitch black territory around the castle. An unusual route awaits participants of this event. Setting off at Grodka Gate, they follow to the nonexistent now Synagogue Maharszala. On their way, pillars of light are coming from the open sewer manholes, and voices are echoing across the streets. These are recorded audio materials of the stories told by the inmates of Lublin castle prison and local inhabitants, who witnessed the times of the ghetto functioning and liquidation. Getting closer to Tysiąclecia Ave., even the bus station loudspeakers start to ring with voices, but having reached the synagogue, participants see that their way is blocked with a heavy black curtain.

In 2004, another symbol of the now vanished Jewish district appeared in Lublin. An original street lantern on Podwale St. that has remained there since the prewar times (now adapted for electricity) embodies Jewish presence in the area. It was lit as a commemoration token during the second mystery of memory, "Poem of the Place" and has been on ever since, night and day.

=== "One Land – Two Temples" ===
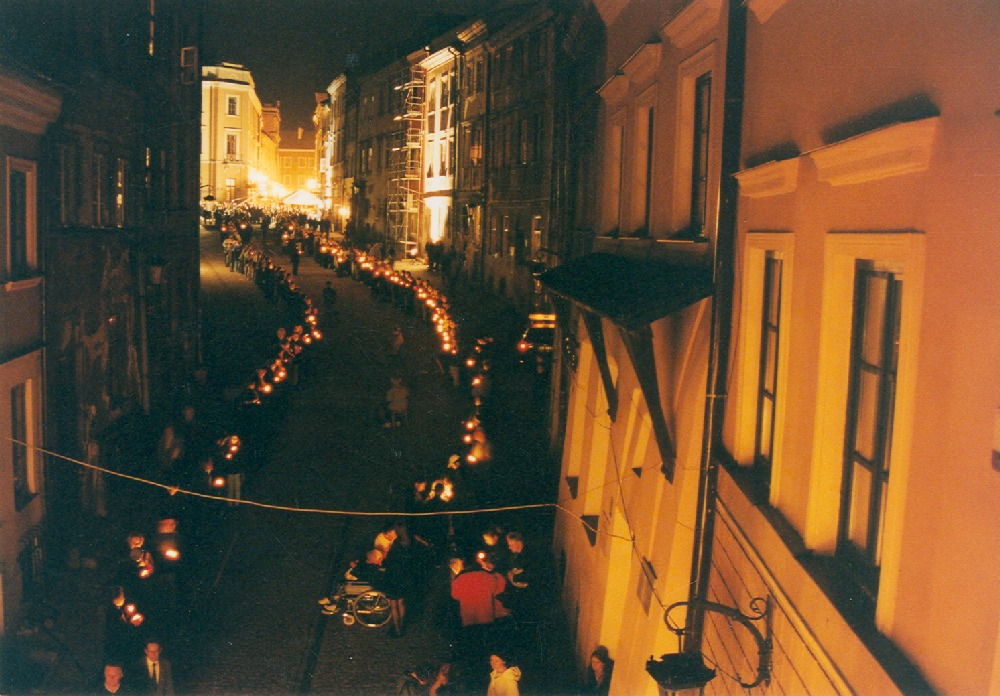
Grodzka St. during the mystery of memory

Mystery of memory «Jedna Ziemia — Dwie Świątynie» (English: "One Land - Two Temples") was organized within the framework of the Congress of Christian Culture, held in Lublin on September 15–17, 2000. It was a wide-scale event with around two thousand attendees. The Chief Rabbi of Poland, Michael Schudrich, gathered some soil into the pot from the place where the synagogue Maharszala used to stand. Józef Życiński, the Roman Catholic Metropolitan Archbishop of Lublin, collected the soil from the place where St. Michael Roman Catholic Church stood. Then, these pots with soil were passed from hand to hand – Catholics were represented by Lublin youth and righteous among the nations, Jews – by the Jewish survivors of World War II and youth from a twin-town Rishon Le Zion. In the passage of Grodzka Gate, a symbolic place of unity of Christian and Judaic cultures, the soil from two pots was blended in one large barrel by a Polish and a Jewish child and professor of John Paul II Catholic University of Lublin, Romuald Jakub Weksler-Waszkinel. Afterwards, a grapevine was planted in that barrel.

Professor Weksler-Waszkinel was not selected to perform that honoured task by chance. He is a Roman Catholic priest, who in the age of thirty five learned from his mother, that he was not her biological child, had Jewish descent and was born in a Jewish ghetto in Švenčionys (then Święciany in the interwar Poland). Later on, he managed to find the names of his biological parents and added to his Polish name (Romuald Weksler) the name of his real father (Jakub Waszkinel). Despite the fact that Weksler-Waszkinel self-identifies himself as a Jew, he continues to perform the duties of a Roman Catholic priest. Additionally, Romuald Jakub Weksler-Waszkinel is actively engaged in various activities, aiming at reconciliation of different peoples and religions.

=== Henio Zytomirski ===
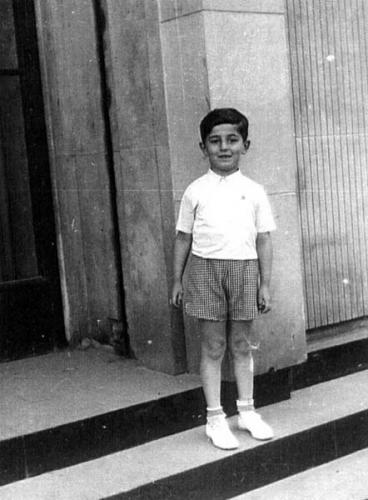
The last picture taken of Henio. The stairs to the bank, July 5, 1939

Henio Żytomirski is a Jewish boy who was born and brought up in Lublin. At the age of nine, he was murdered in a gas chamber at Majdanek concentration camp.

The part of the exposition in the "Grodzka Gate" is devoted to Henio Żytomirski. Apart from that, the centre organizes different commemorative events on a regular basis, such as «Listy do Henia». There was also Henio's profile on Facebook. Henio's profile was moderated by Piotr Brożek, the Grodzka Gate employee. On the boy's behalf, he was sharing pictures and posts in Polish. Eventually, the profile gained friends among foreigners, who translated it into their mother tongues. The centre collected a sizable piece of data about Henio (including the letters and pictures sent by his family to the relatives), which enabled it to create a rather in-depth reconstruction of the boy's life. But due to the violation of Facebook regulations (creating an impostor account), Henio Żytomirski's page was deleted in July 2010.

== Oral history ==
Since 1998, the "Grodzka Gate" has been implementing the project «Historia Mówiona» (English: "The Oral History Programme"). It is based on collecting audio and video recorded memories of witnesses of various historical events. Pursuant to oral history guidelines, the "Grodzka Gate" collected memories of almost 2,000 people and recordings of more than 3,000 hours of audio and video materials. The main topics of the interviews are mundane life, education, intercultural reciprocity, World War II, The Holocaust, Polish-Jewish relations during the war and opposition and underground publishing during the years of The Polish People's Republic. Gathered materials constitute the largest collection of this kind in Poland, which is available on the Internet. Every file fulfills the requirements of The Dublin Core Metadata Initiative and is stored in the system dLibra.

Compiled data is actively applied to other projects carried out by the centre, such as exhibitions, installations, paratheatrical plays, educational activities, etc., to create a proper atmosphere and "breathe in some life" and personality into history.

== Departments ==
Lublin Underground Route (Polish: Lubelska Trasa Podziemna) is one of the separate departments of the "Grodzka Gate", opened for visitors in 2006. It is a 280-meter-long trail that serves touristic and educational purposes and runs beneath the 16th -17th century houses of the Old town. Its starting point is the Royal Tribunal from which it goes under the streets Złota and Archidiakońska and ends on Plac Po Farze. In the course of the trail the visitors encounter fourteen exposition halls with replica models, reflecting the history of Lublin since the 8th century. The highlight of the route is a big multimedia model of the great fire of Lublin in 1719.

Museum of printing House of Words (Polish: Dom Słów) on Żmigród, 1 is another separate department of The Grodzka Gate. It was established in 2006. Initially, it was called The Chamber of Printing (Polish: Izba Drukarstwa). The second opening of the institution took place on October 3, 2014. Renewed exhibition pays special attention to the value of words – printed and oral ones – in social life and culture. House of Words unveils for its visitors all major stages of the book creation process – pagination, printing of pictures, typography etc. Some activities of the institution are targeted to underline the role of "the liberty of speech" as the marker of social changes. Numerous workshops organized there set great store by reading and its promotion.

== Links ==
- Steve Lipman. The Gate To Poland’s Jewish Life // The Jewish Week, 11/06/2012

The “Grodzka Gate ‐ NN Theatre” Centre, English language website
