= Łódź Design Festival =

Polish international design festival

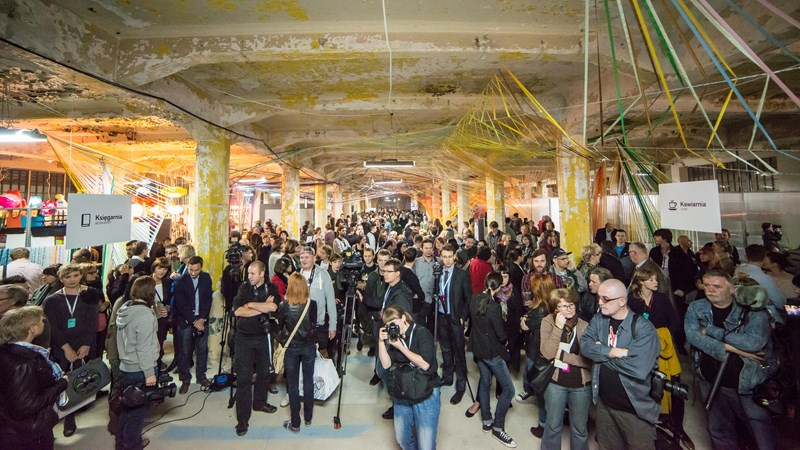
Opening of Łódź Design Festival 2012

Łódź Design Festival is an international festival of design taking place since 2007 in Łódź, Poland. It presents different faces of design including industrial design, arts and crafts design, graphic design, architectural design, service design and fashion design.

== Programme ==
The festival programme has continued to expand upon the ongoing dialogue with the audience, to finally assume its current shape.

It now comprises:

- Main Programme - the core of the festival consisting of exhibitions curated around the festival’s annual theme and featuring different approaches to design.
- make me! - a competition that allows beginning designers to show their work. The post-competition exhibition presented as part of the festival is a reflection on the search for a design identity pursued by young creators.
- Educreation - a space designed for families with children.
- must have - a competition and exhibition that aim to select and promote the best Polish product implementations.
- Open Programme - selection of external projects to the accompanying program of the festival.

== Coverage ==
Moreover, from 1 January to 31 October 2013, the 7th edition of Łódź Design Festival was mentioned more than 2034 times in different media: radio, TV, internet, print media (data source: Press Service) News about Łódź Design Festival were presented in the popular media in Poland e.g. Design Alive, Wallpaper, Eksklusiv, Kikimora, Przekrój, Gazeta Wyborcza, Elle-Decoration, Architektura-murator, Czas na wnętrze and also in the main polish TV coverage: Polsat, Polsat News, TVP Łódź, TVP Kultura, TVN.

A New York Times blog wrote about Łódź Design Festival too: "This October, fashion week overlaps with the fourth annual Łódź Design festival; one of its curators is the Wrocław-based rising star Oskar Zieta, whose inflated metal stools look like Mylar balloons."

== See also ==
- Cultural events in Poland
