= Gubałówka =

Mountain in Poland

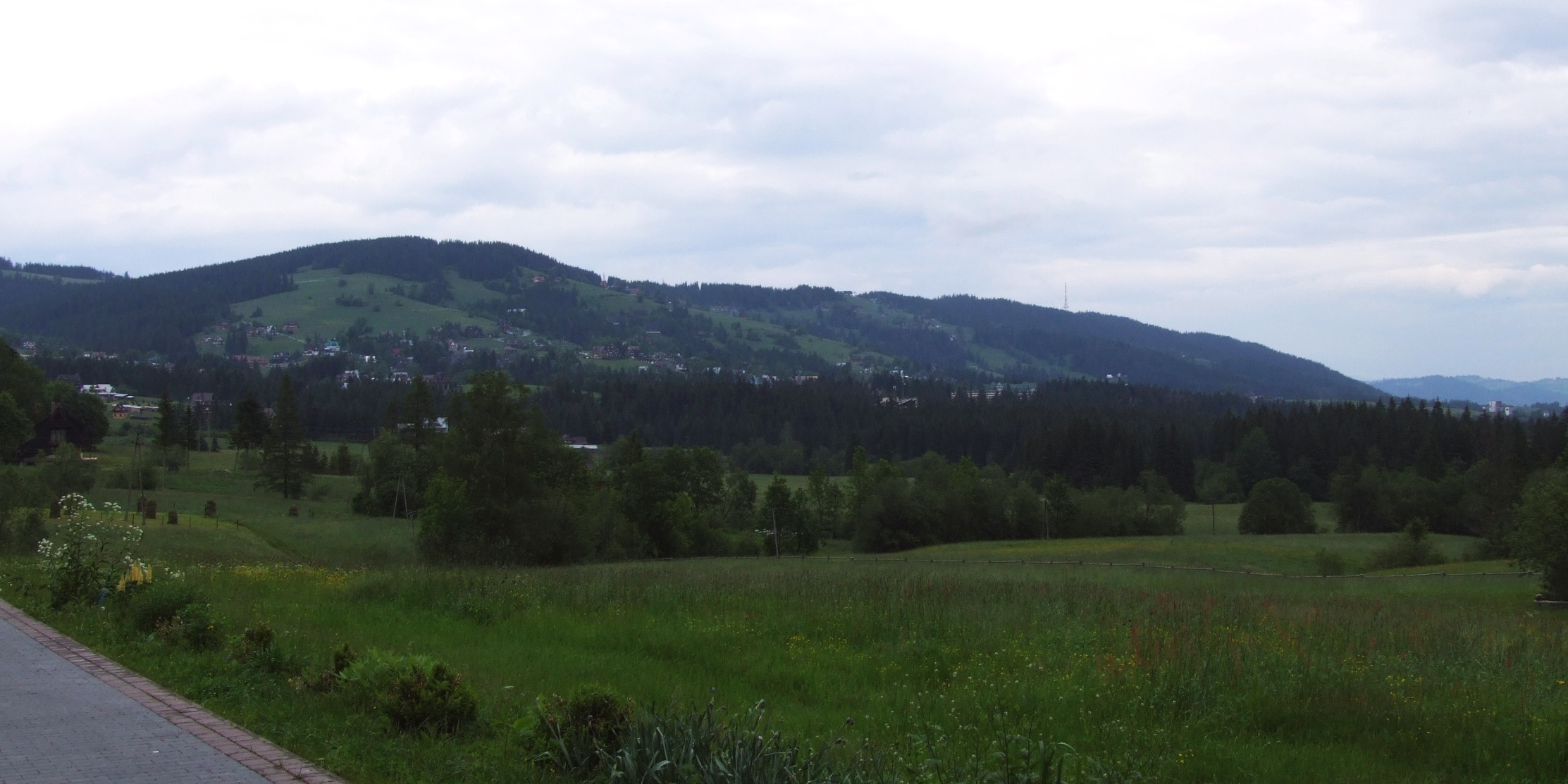

Highest point
- Elevation: 1,129 m (3,704 ft)
- Coordinates: 49°18′27″N 19°56′9″E

Naming
- Pronunciation: /goo͞′ba'wuf.ka/

Geography
- Location within Lesser Poland Voivodeship Location within Poland
- Location: Zakopane, Poland
- Parent range: Gubałówka Range; Western Carpathians

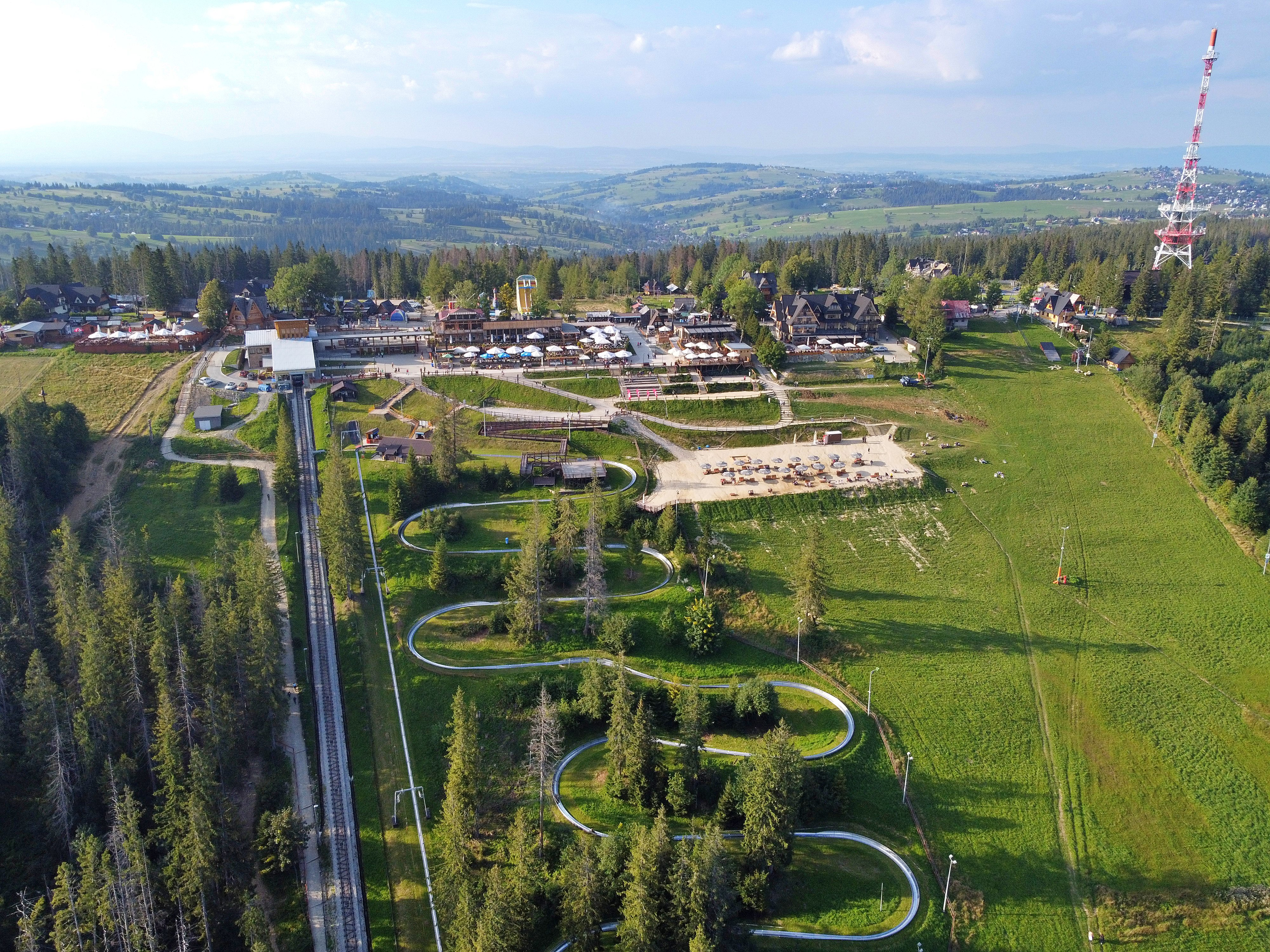
The Zakopane-Gubałówka transmitter (Polish: RTON Gubałówka) is located atop the mountain.

Gubałówka is a mountain in the Gubałówka Range (Polish: Pasmo Gubałowskie or Pogórze Gubałowskie), above the Polish town of Zakopane. The mountain is a popular tourist attraction, offering commanding views of the Tatras and Zakopane. In 1938 the Gubałówka Hill funicular connected Zakopane and the top of Gubałówka. The chair lift to Butorowy Wierch was opened in 1978.

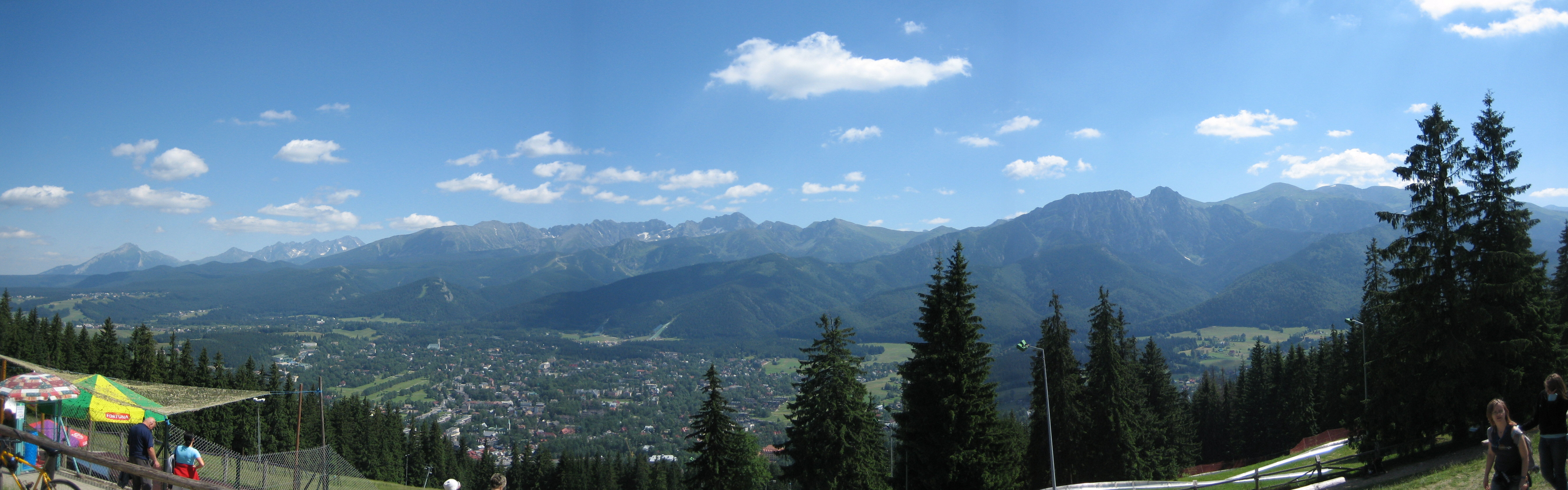
Panorama of the Tatras from Gubałówka
