= The House of Words =

Typography museum in Poland

- Dom Słów
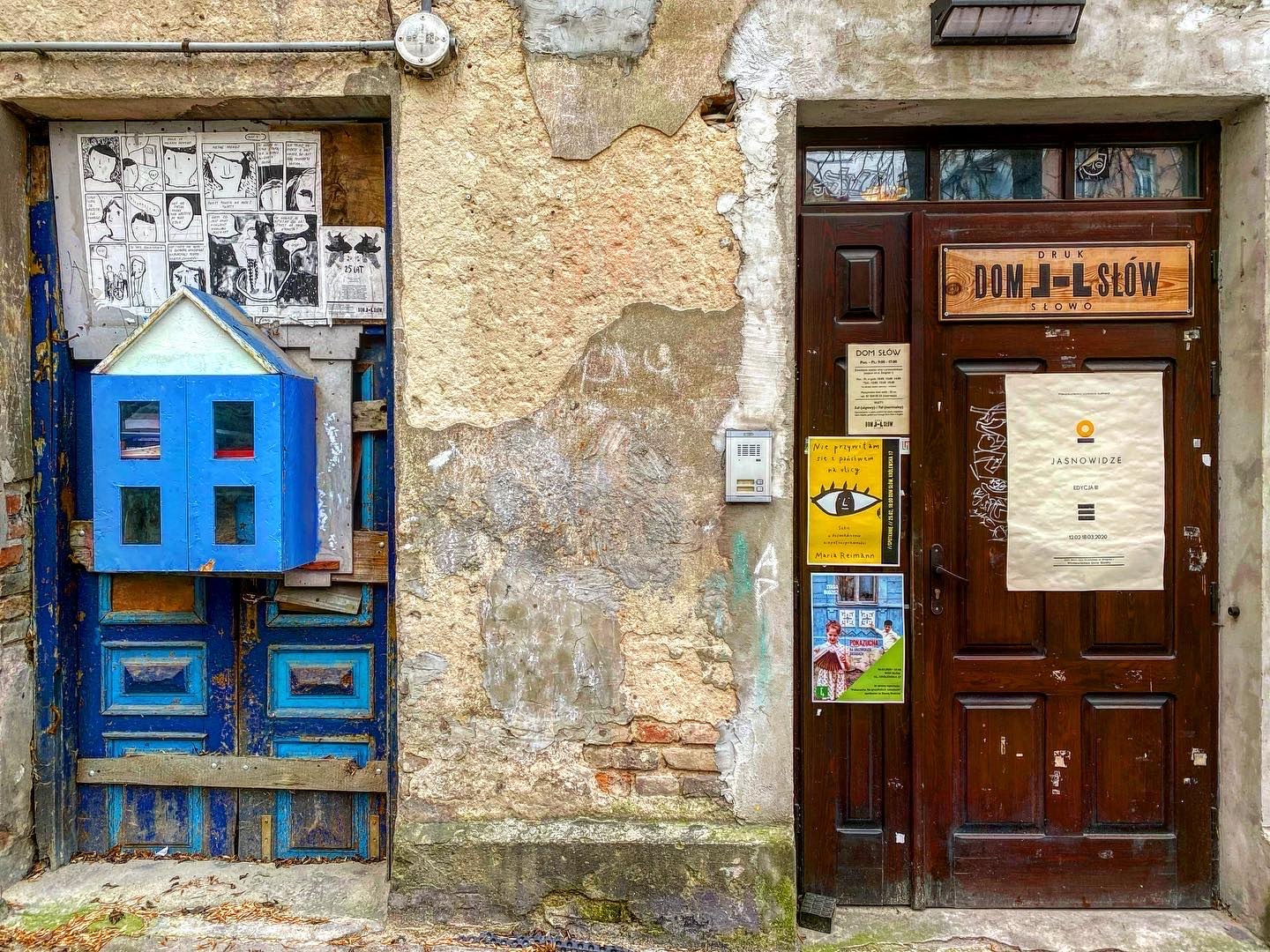
- Location: ul.Żmigród 1/ Królewska 17 20-110 Lublin, Poland
- Coordinates: 51°14′46″N 22°34′04″E
- Fields: Culture heritage, education
- Parent organization: Grodzka Gate – NN Theatre
- Website: teatrnn.pl/domslow

The House of Words (pol. Dom Słów, formerly known as Chamber of Printing, a museum of typography in Poland, is a multimodal education center. It familiarizes the audience with poetry and art, old techniques of printing, and the history and achievements of the Lublin printing industry.

Located at Żmigród 1 Street in Lublin, inside Pociej's Palace.

== Mission ==
According to its statement: The programme of the House of Words is structured around the meaning of the written word in cultural and social contexts. Thus, the institution became an enabler and a new subject matter expert in the field of the written word and literature.

== Foundations ==
The museum was located in the pre-war printing house "Popularna", which operated since 1932. Before World War II, authors like Józef Czechowicz and Józef Łobodowski were among its customers. During the occupation from 1939 to 1944, there were illegal brochures printed. In March 1944, acting on tips by informers, the Germans arrested 14 printers of Popularna. They were shot at Majdanek Concentration Camp on 3 June 1944. Post war, the printing house became a property of the state, and its user Labor Co-operative "Intrograf", in 1972 has established there a Chamber of Traditional Lublin Printing.

== Currently ==
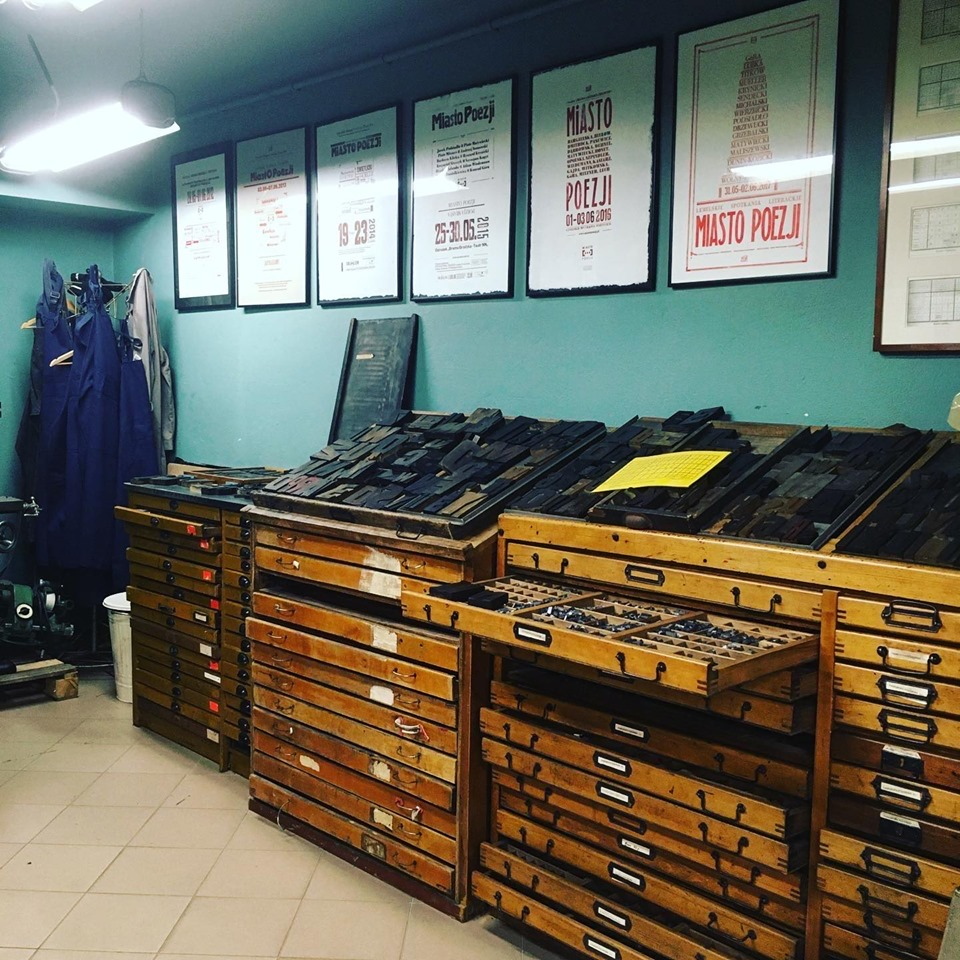

The Chamber of Polish Printing Memory was re-opened on 6 May 2008, driven by "Grodzka Gate – NN Theatre." The center took over the building in 2006 and fixed it; historic printing machines were also repaired, and can be presently operated. The Chamber of Printing, besides its permanent exhibitions, presents various temporary exhibitions and leads artistic and educational workshops for youth audiences.

== See also ==
- History of Printing
