= Tatra Museum =

Coordinates: 49.2948°N 19.9499°E

The Tatra Museum
- Muzeum Tatrzańskie im. dra Tytusa Chałubińskiego
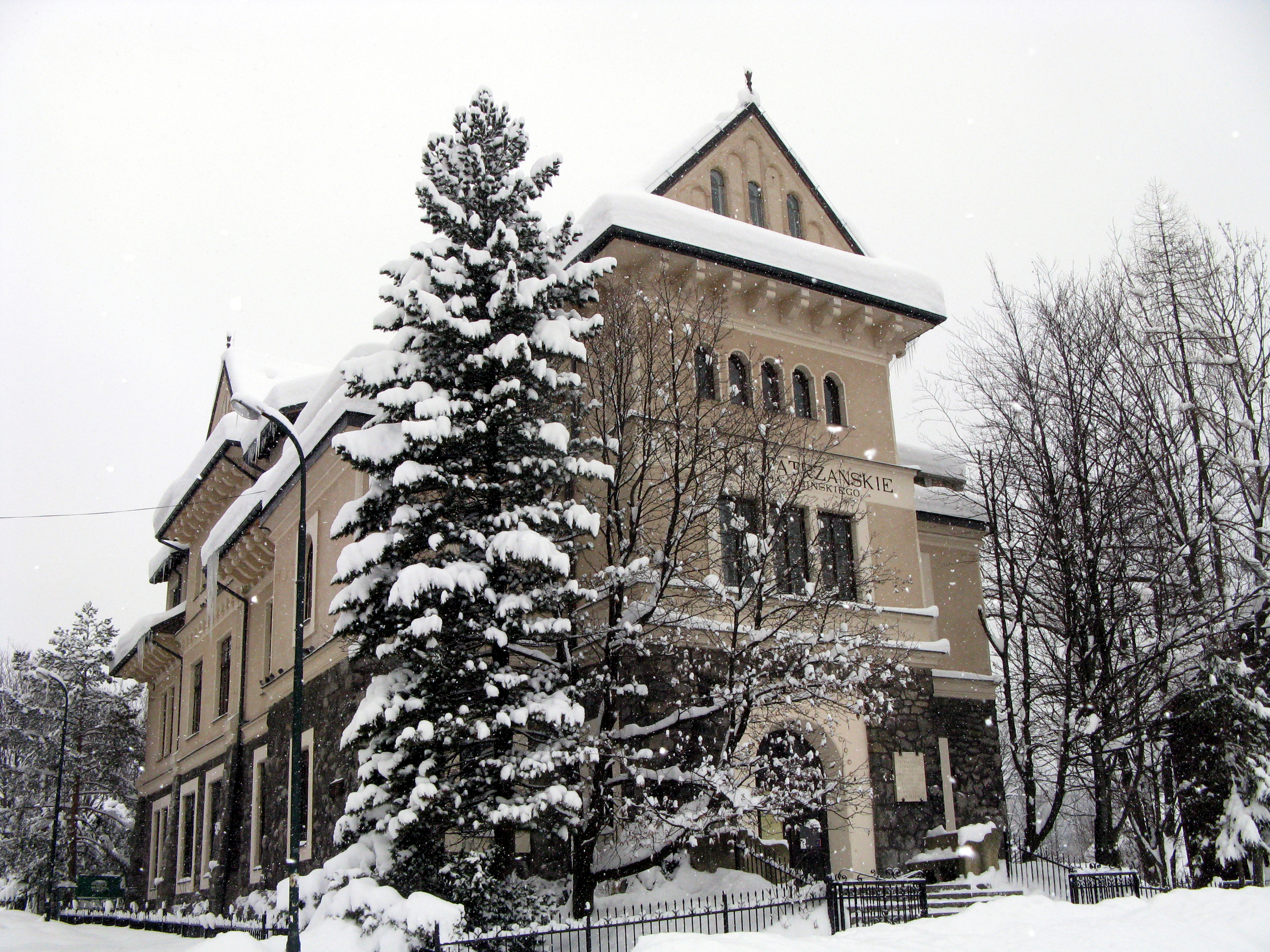
- Established: 1888
- Location: Krupówki 10, Zakopane, Poland
- Type: Public museum
- Collections: History, Ethnography, Natural history, Painting, Photography, Sculpture
- Director: Anna Wende-Surmiak
- Website: muzeumtatrzanskie.pl

The Tatra Museum is a museum of the history, culture, nature and ethnography of the Polish Tatras; its main branch is located in Zakopane, Poland.

== History ==
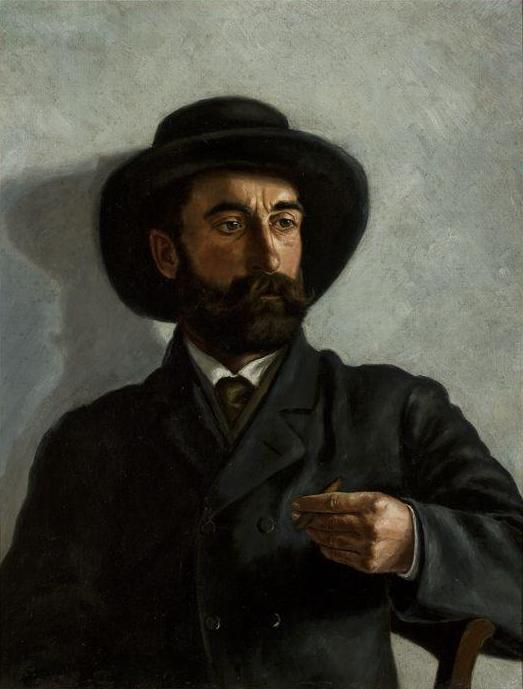
Stanisław Witkiewicz - architect of the museum building and founder of Zakopane style; here in a self-portrait

The museum was established by the Tatra Museum Society, and the building which today serves as the main branch, located in the centre of Zakopane, at 10 Krupówki Street, was designed specifically for this purpose by Stanisław Witkiewicz and Franciszek Mączyński. The building is an example of a "brick-and-stone" variety of Zakopane style architecture. The design was prepared in 1913, and the building started between 1913 and 1914. Count Władysław Zamoyski, a member of the Tatra Museum Society, donated the stones used for building. After the first world war, which had slowed the completion of building, the remaining works and preparations of exhibitions were possible thanks to a loan from Maria Skłodowska-Curie.

== Collections and branches ==
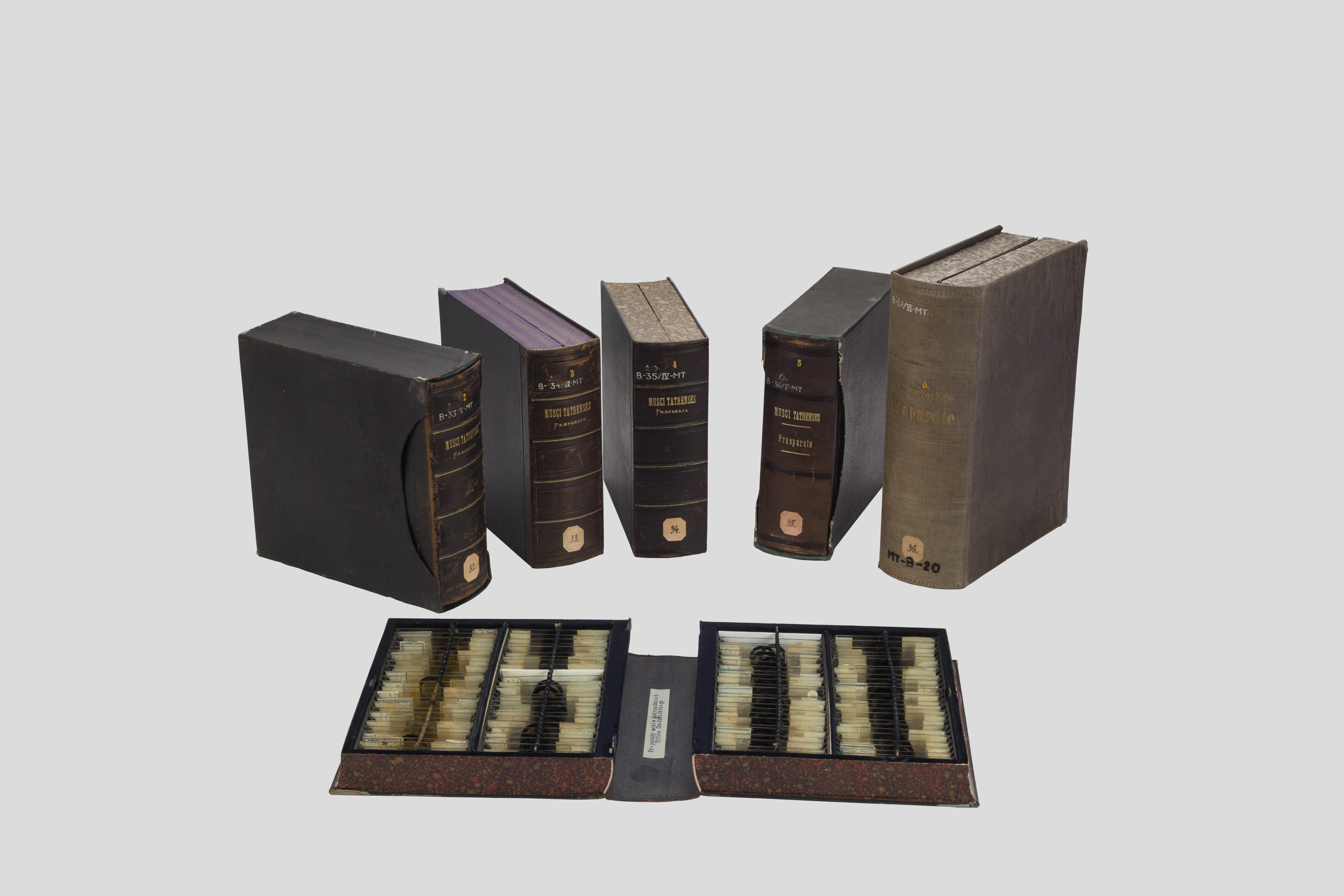
Herbarium of Tatra Mosses by Tytus Chałubiński, natural history collection of the Tatra Museum in Zakopane

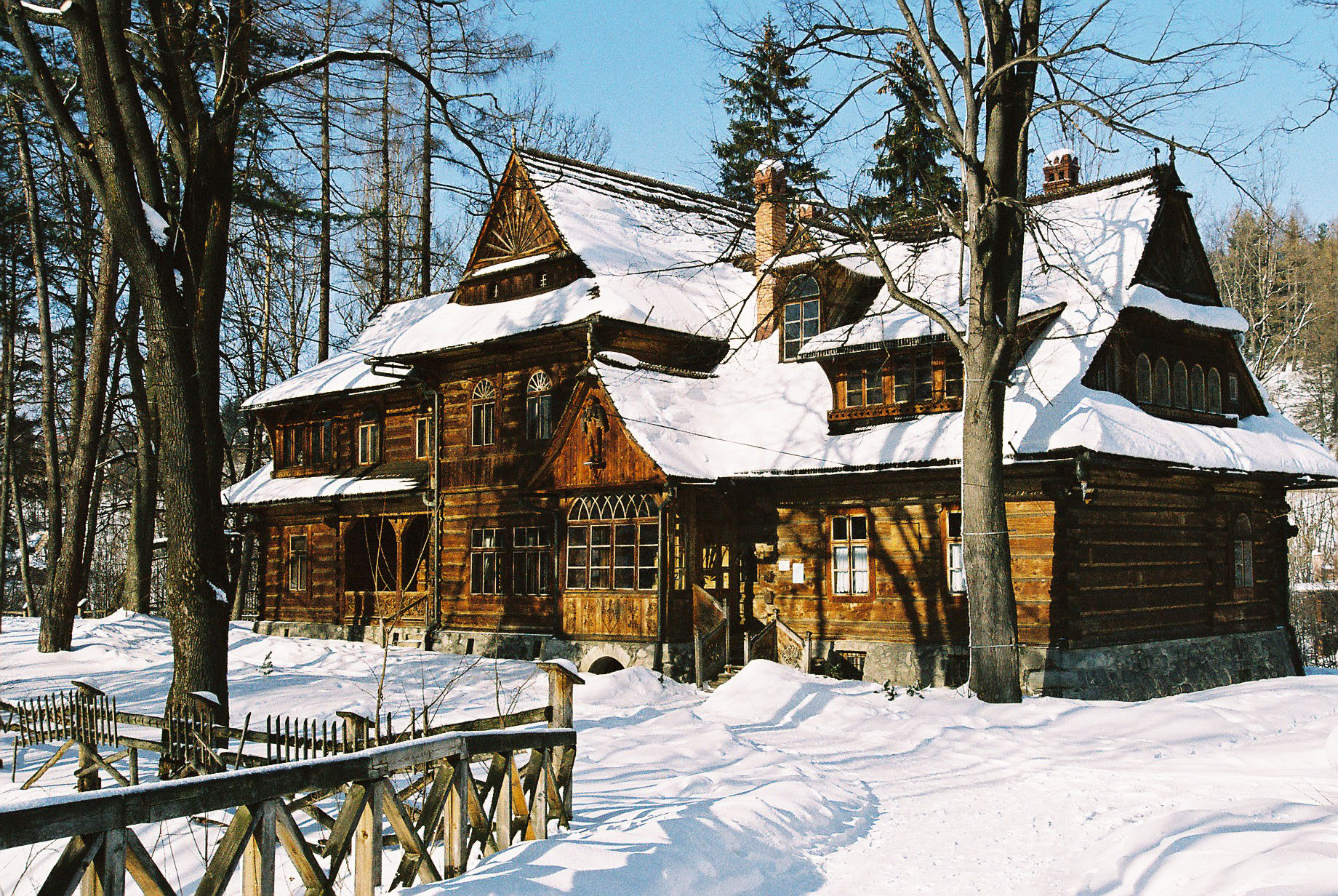
Museum of Zakopane Style at Villa Koliba - a branch of the Tatra Museum in Zakopane

Apart from the main branch in Zakopane, at Krupówki Street 10, the museum has 7 other branches in Zakopane and 4 other branches, located in Czarna Góra, Jurgów, Chochołów and Łopuszna.

The museum holds and presents:

- cultural and ethnographic artifacts, historical clothing, furniture, household objects, decorative objects, glass painting, and crafts;
- natural history, flora and fauna of the Tatras; geological exhibits;
- fine arts, mainly painting and sculpture created in the Podhale region.

Besides the main branch, within Zakopane there are 11 branches of the Tatra Museum, including:

- The Museum of Zakopane Style at Villa Koliba;
- The Museum of Zakopane Style - Inspirations in the Dembowski Villa;
- The Władysław Hasior Gallery in Zakopane;
- The Villa Oksza Gallery of 20th Century Art;
- The Kornel Makuszyński Museum;
- Art Gallery in Koziniec.

== Permanent exhibitions ==
=== Historical exhibition ===
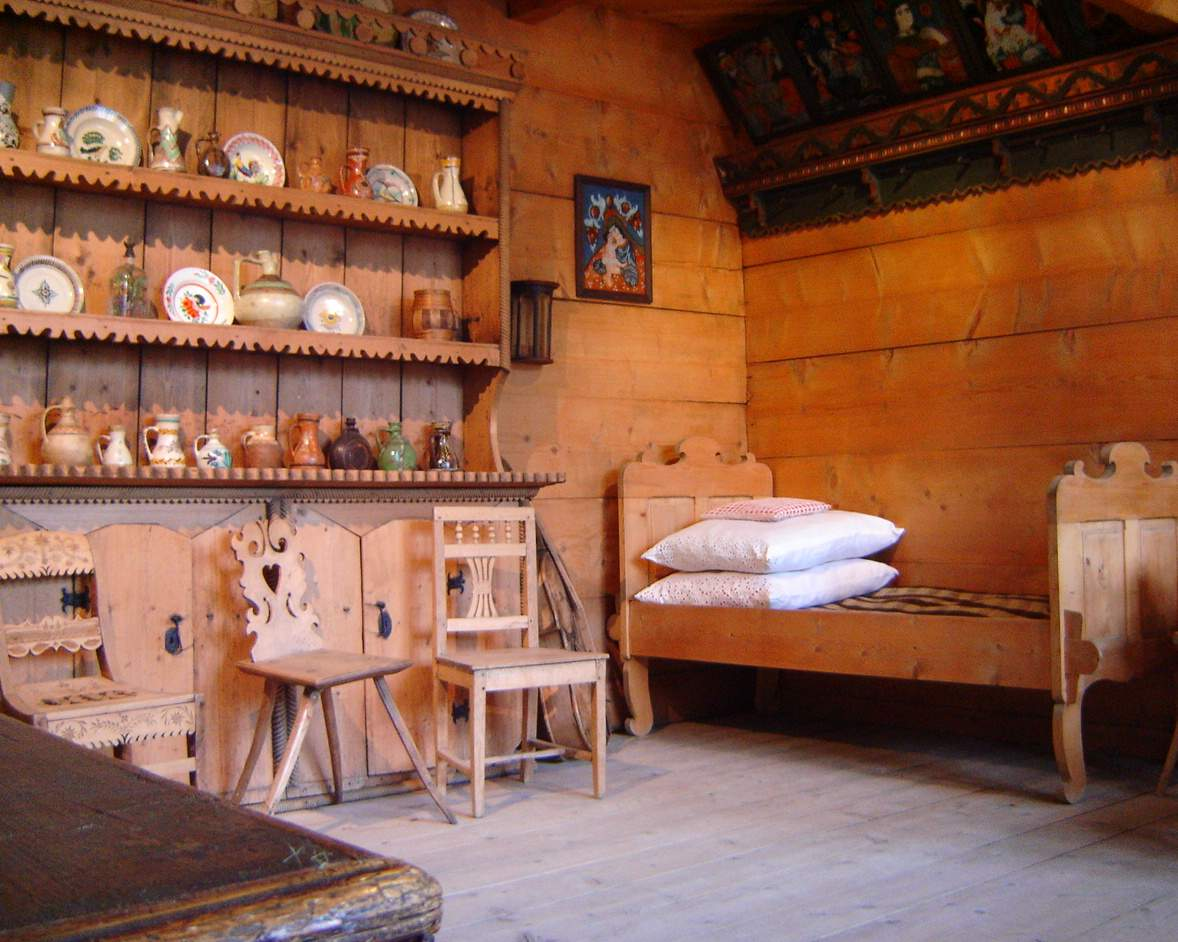
The 'white room', ethnographic exhibition

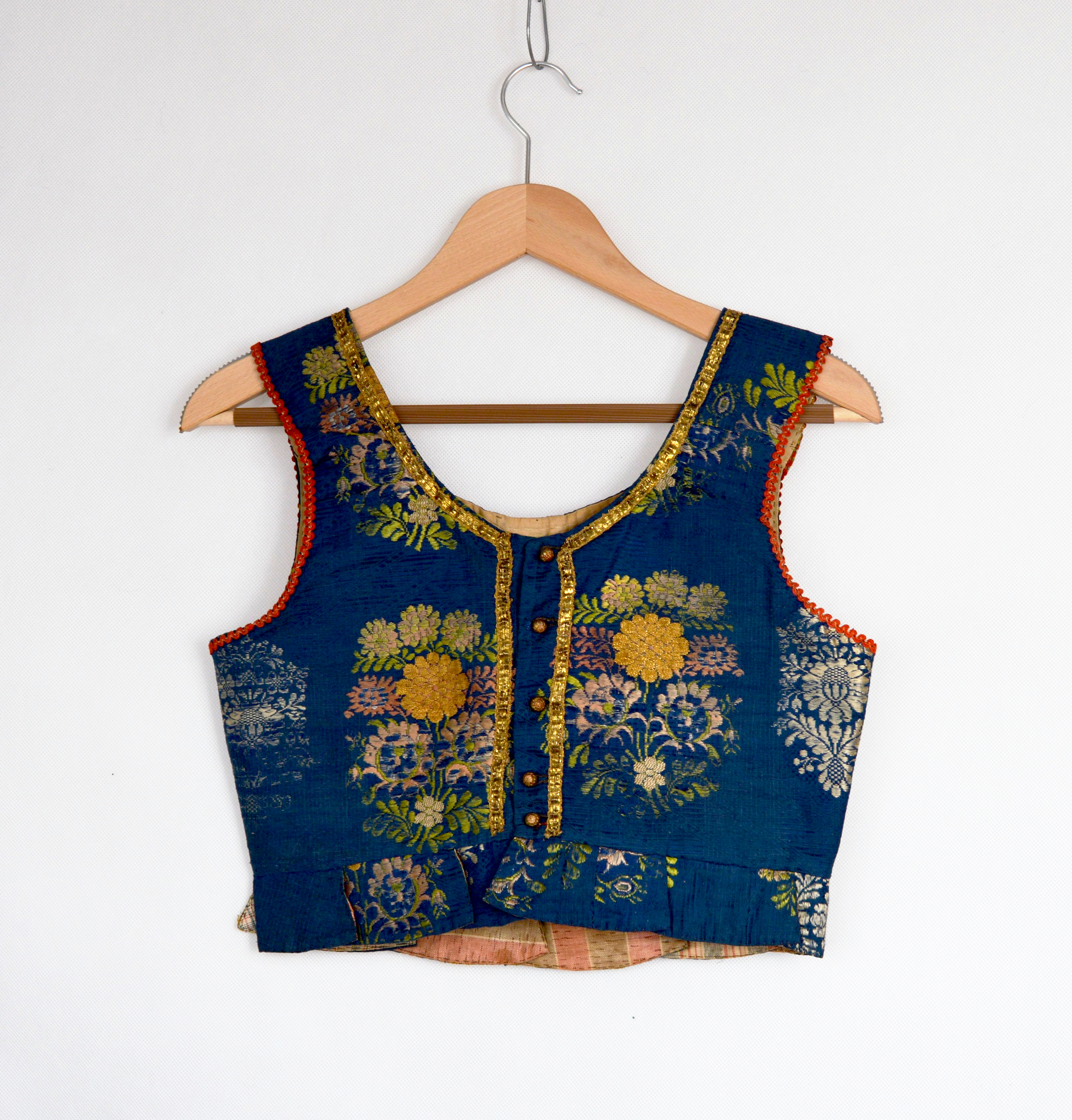
19th century Podhale corset, ethnographic collection of Tatra Museum

The main building houses an exhibition presenting the history of the Polish Tatras. Photographs, archival documents and publications present a history of the Podhale region from prehistoric times, through first human settlements, the development of towns and villages, the development of Zakopane from a small village into a health resort and centre of the arts and culture in the interwar period. The exhibition presents the time of Zakopane's rapid development and the emergence of a society of active artists and social activists in Podhale at the end of the 19th century and the beginning of the 20th century. Tytus Chałubiński, Stanisław Witkiewicz and many other Polish artists had chosen Zakopane as their resort of choice, fascinated by the local folklore and nature. The exhibition traces further developments of the city and region until the present day.

=== Ethnographic exhibition ===
The ethnographic exhibition presents, among others, an interior of a typical 19th century Podhale cottage, with two spaces – the "white" and "black" rooms separated by a vestibule. An original entrance door decorated with diagonal wooden pegs – originally part of Stanisław Wójciak's house in Kościelisko – was purchased by the museum in 1905 and now leads to the reconstruction of the cottage. The inside of the cottage presents the way of life of 19th century Podhale families. Daily life concentrated in the ‘black’ chamber, its walls darkened by the smoke from the stove.

Other exhibits include the historic clothing of Podhale Gorals and the arts and crafts. The Ethnographic department is the second-oldest in the museum and its ethnographic collection features approximately 10,750 items. Many enthusiasts of the culture of Podhale Gorals donated historical items and clothing to The Tatra Museum: Countess Róża Krasińska, Bronisław Dembowski, and Zygmunt Gnatowski. In 1949, after the museum was nationalised, ethnographers were employed to acquire items missing from the already rich and valuable collection. The new acquisitions were mainly paintings and a large collection of glass painting, as well as folk sculpture and crafts, especially made of metal and leather. Many of these items are on display in the main building.
