= Zakopane Style =

Polish architectural style

Zakopane Style (or Witkiewicz Style) is an art style, most visible in architecture, but also found in furniture and related objects, inspired by the regional art of Poland's highland regions, most notably Podhale. Drawing on the motifs and traditions in the buildings of the Carpathian Mountains, this synthesis was created by Stanisław Witkiewicz and is now considered to be one of the core traditions of the Goral people.

== Characteristics ==
In Zakopane's architecture, wood is the primary building material. The rocky and hilly environment of Poland's mountain regions, along with local culture and traditions, has created a diverse range of wooden architectural styles. The building design and the design of local products speak of the traditions of the past that still survive today, revealing the impact of Polish culture. Wood carvings frequently incorporate local designs inspired by daily items, as well as inspirations from cultures and styles outside the region. The Zakopane style was not just a concept people talked about. It was widely used in construction — not only in Zakopane, but in other areas of what was once Polish territory. The style spread beyond its origin and had a significant real-world impact.

== Development ==
As the Podhale region developed into a tourist area in the mid-19th century, the population of Zakopane began to rise. The new buildings to house these new well-to-do inhabitants was built in the style of Swiss and later Austro-Hungarian chalets.

Stanislaw Witkiewicz, an art critic, architect, painter, novelist and journalist, was chosen to design a villa for Zygmunt Gnatowski. In his plans, Witkiewicz decided against using foreign building styles and instead chose to utilize the local traditions used by the native Górals of Podhale. Drawing on the Vernacular architecture of the Carpathians, Witkiewicz used as a model the modest but richly decorated homes in Góral villages such as Chochołów which he further enriched by incorporating select elements, among other, of Polish manor style elements, Art Nouveau style, thus giving birth to the Zakopane Style. This building, known as the Villa "Koliba" was built between 1892 and 1894, and it still stands to this day on Koscieliska Street in the mountain resort of Zakopane.

Stanislaw Witkiewicz was deeply committed to the Zakopane Style," which he believed would restore the town's original architectural integrity. Based on construction methods of the Podhale highlanders, Witkiewicz was motivated to start a new school of architecture. Witkiewicz's personal experiences may have contributed to some of the style elements in his designs, particularly those that were not characteristic in traditional Podhale architecture. Despite his repeated calls in magazines to architects to innovate and revolutionize the emerging style, Witkiewicz was not backed. Thus, he accepted the challenge and personally designed the Koliba Villa to bring his vision to life. His architectural dream was realized by local highlanders and woodcarvers, who actively worked on its construction.

Witkiewicz designed a number of original buildings in Zakopane, including the "Dom pod Jedlami" in the Koziniec district, the chapel in the Jaszczurowka district, Villa "Oksza" on Zamojski Street, the building of the Tatra Museum, the chapel of St. John the Baptist in the parish Church of the Holy Family on Krupówki Street, and the Korniłowicz family chapel in the Bystre district.

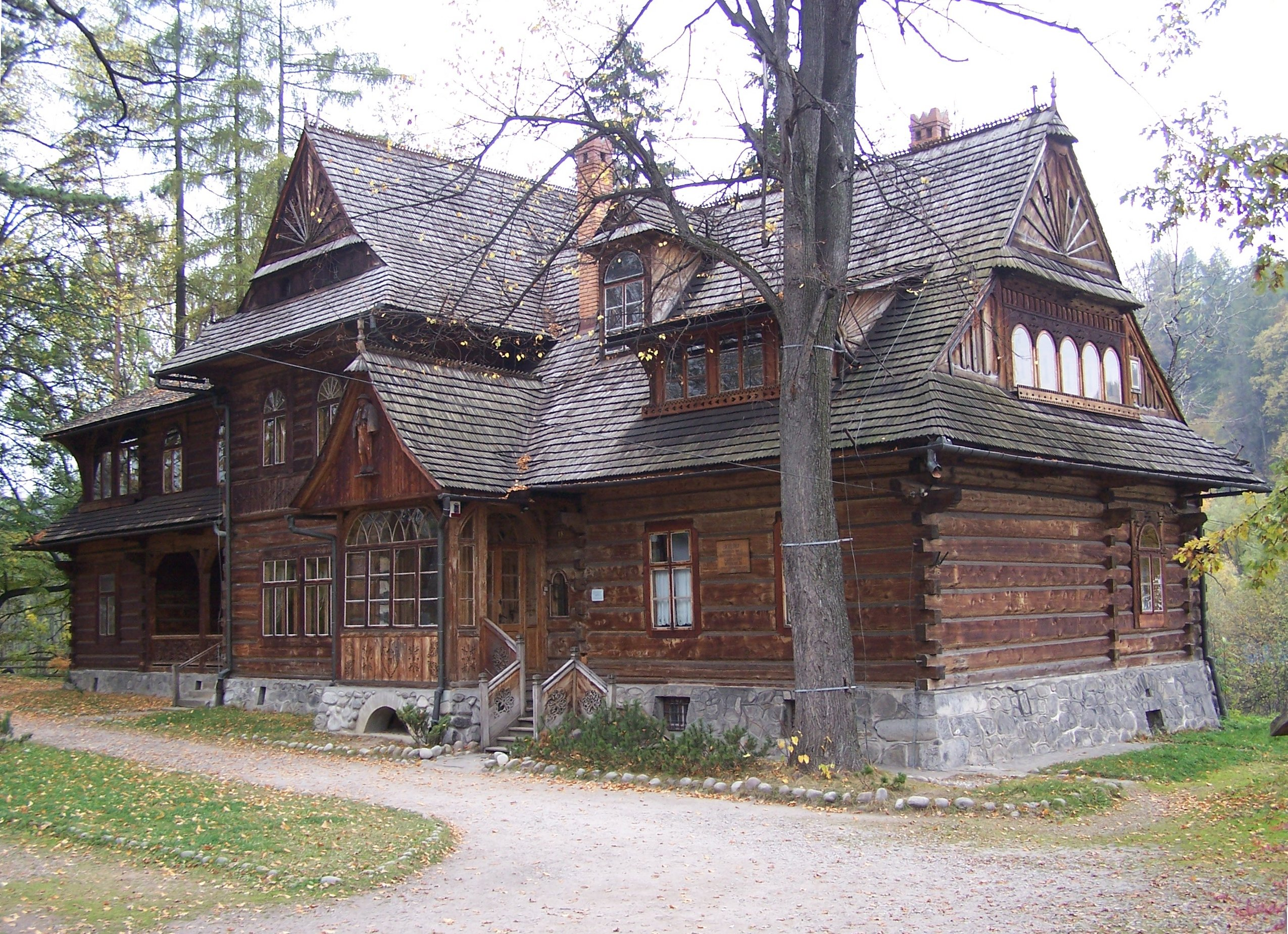
An exterior shot of Villa "Koliba"

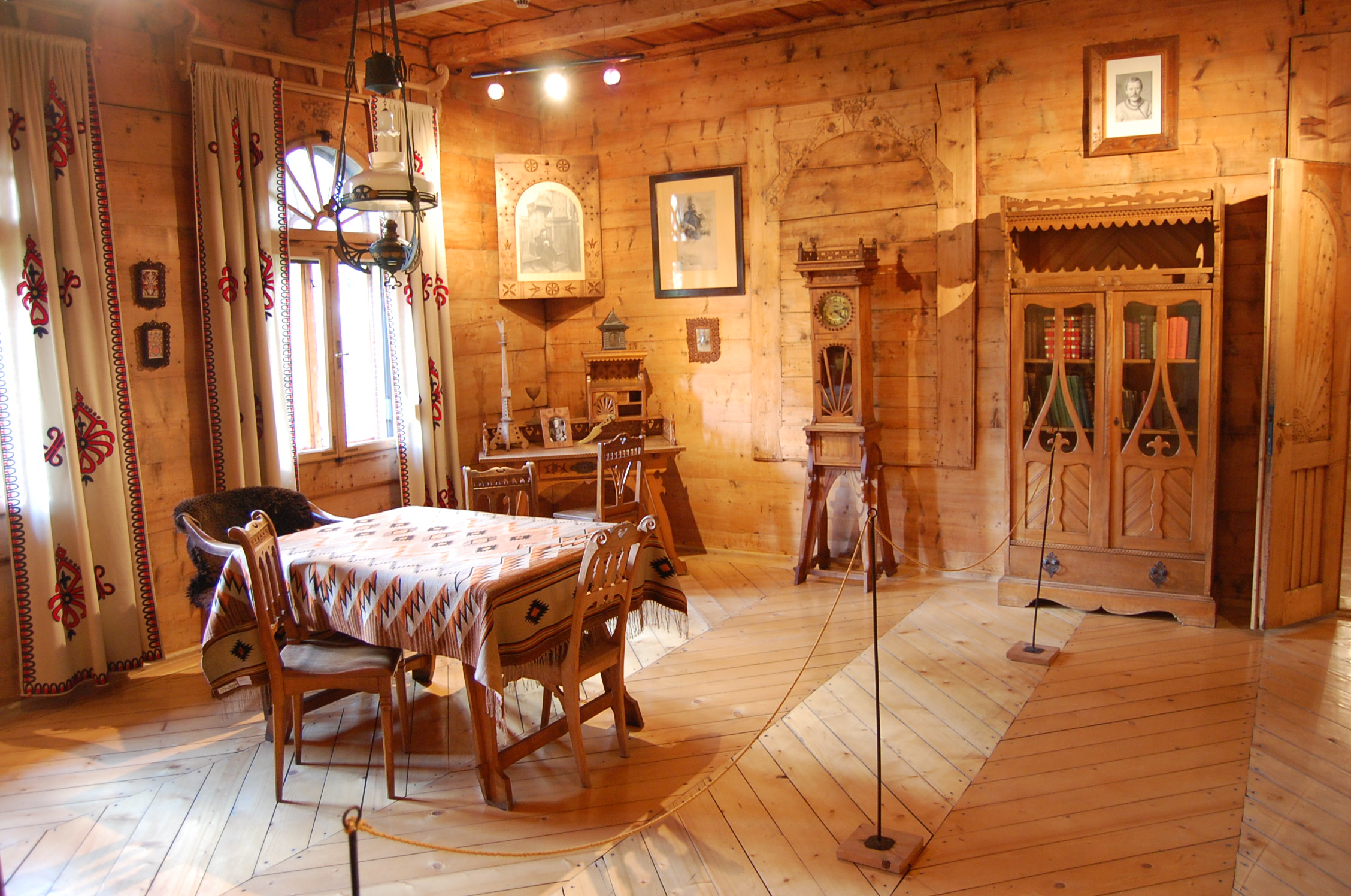
Interior of Villa "Koliba"

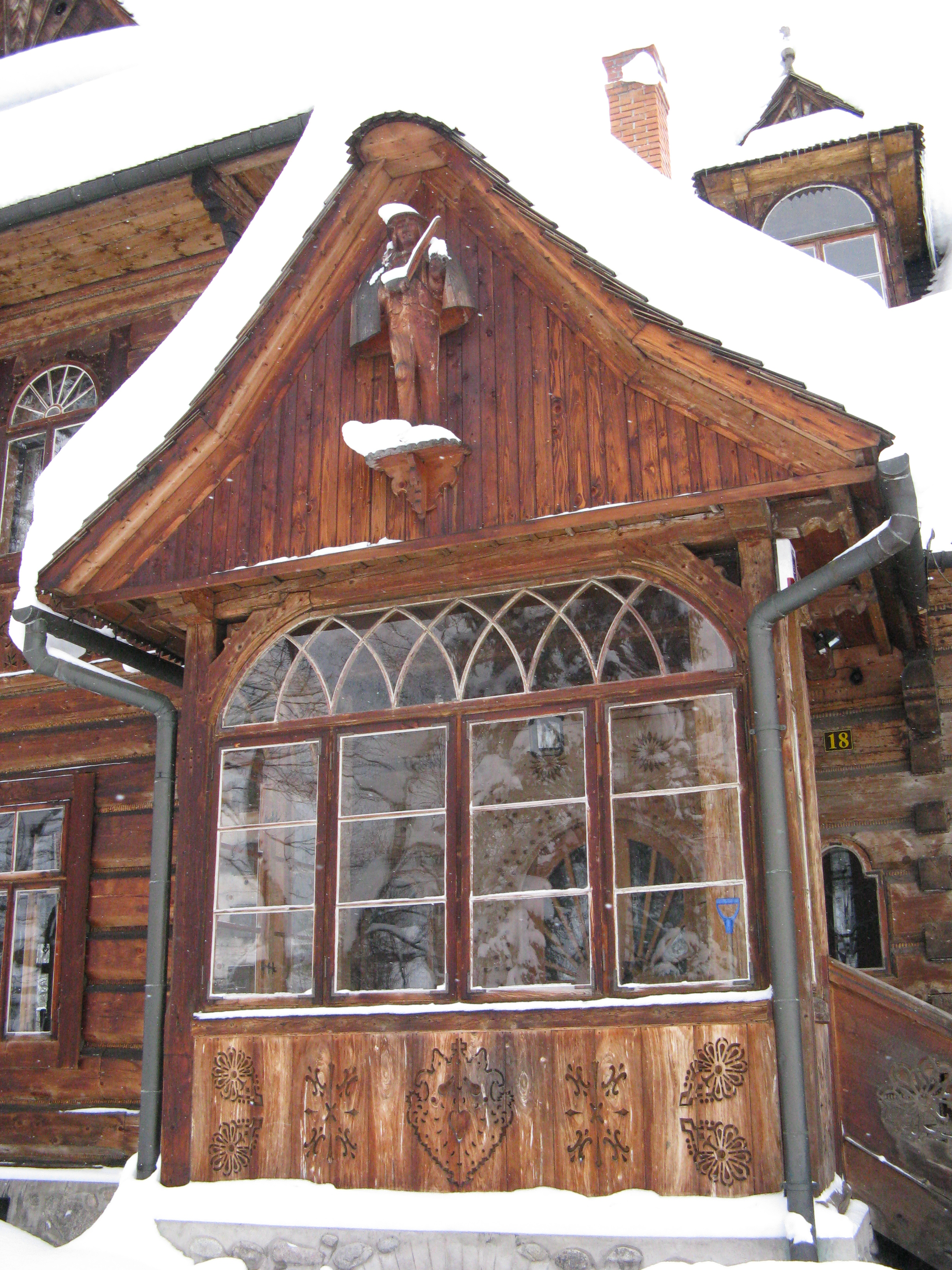
Villa "Koliba" detail

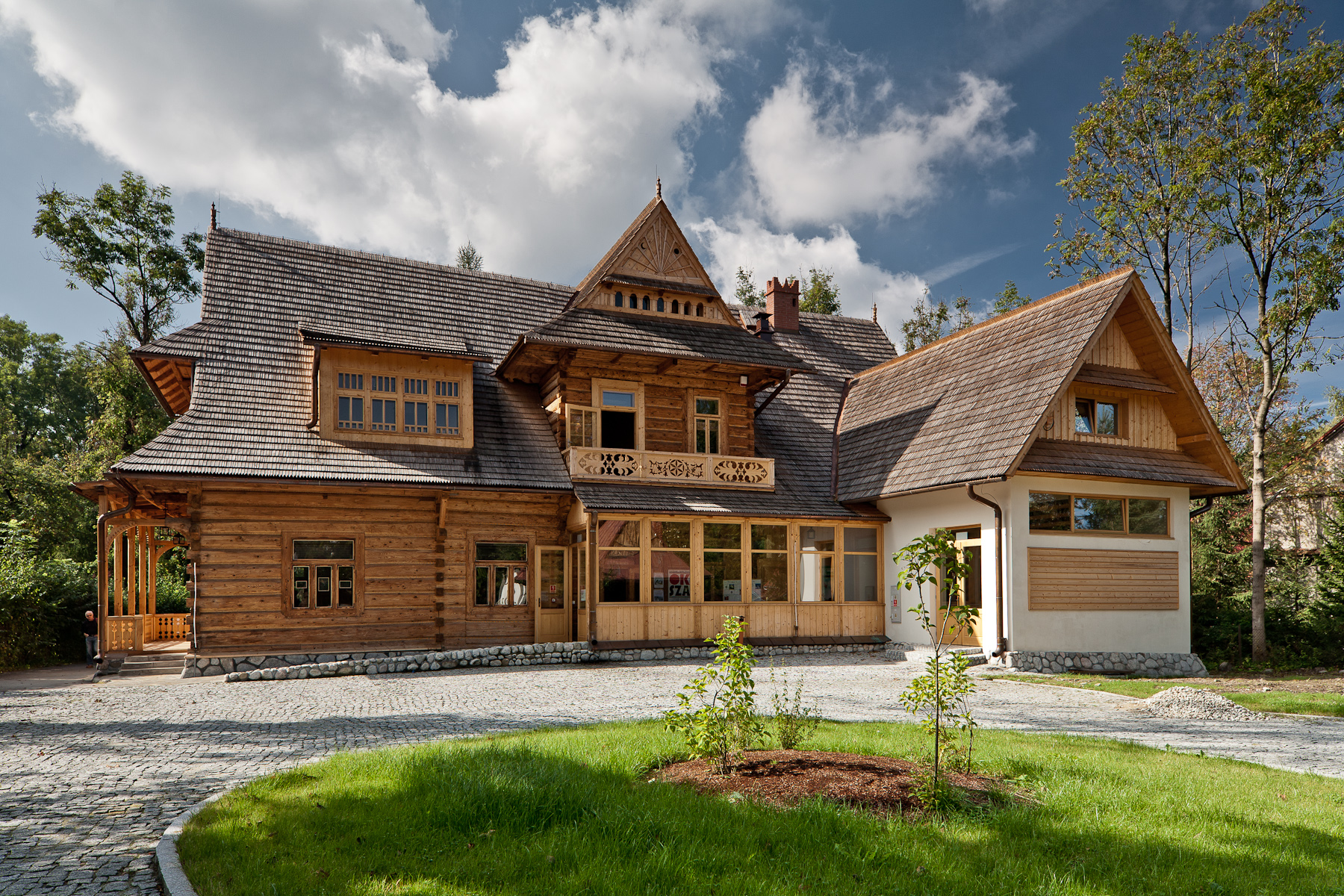
Villa Oksza

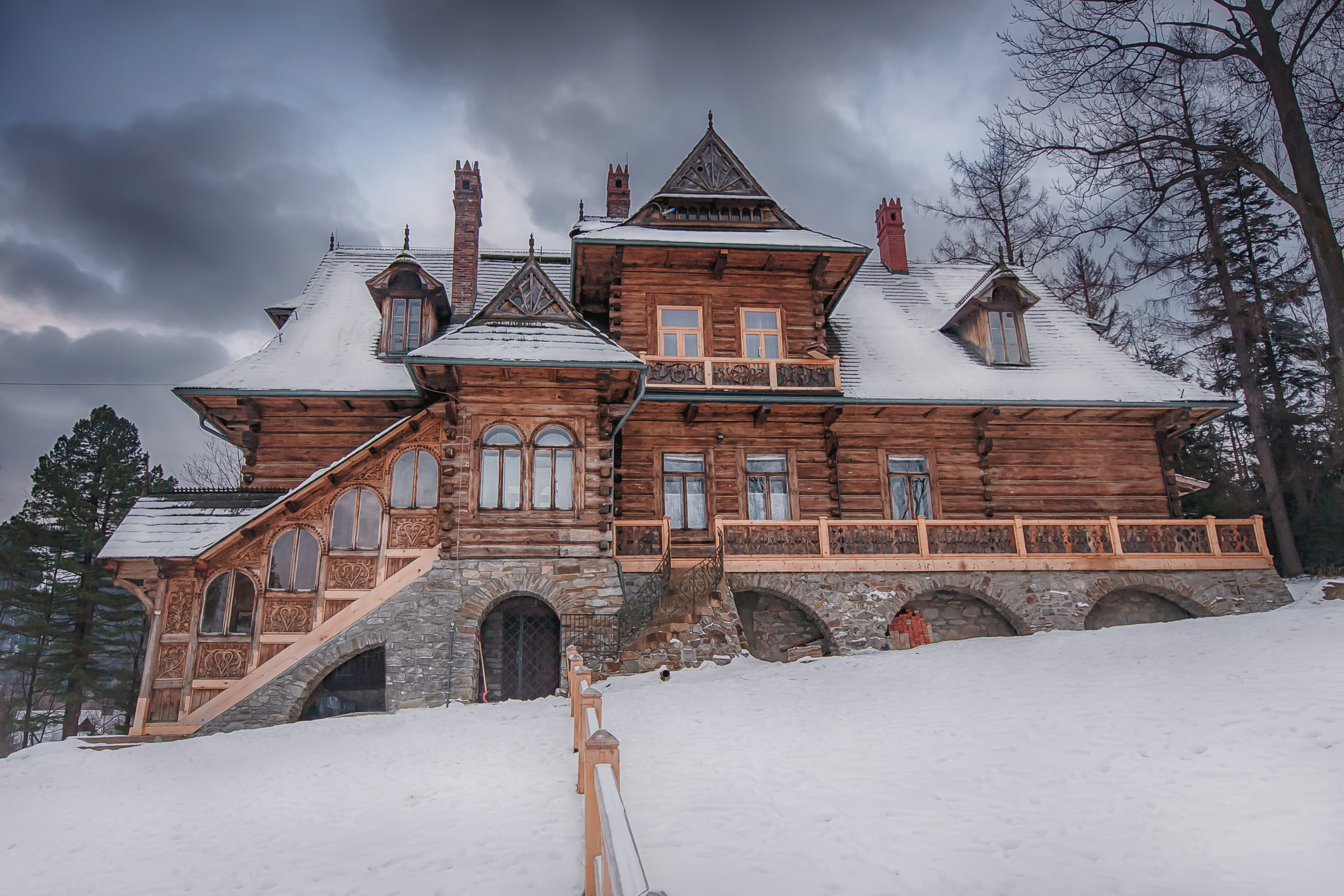
Pod Jedlami villa

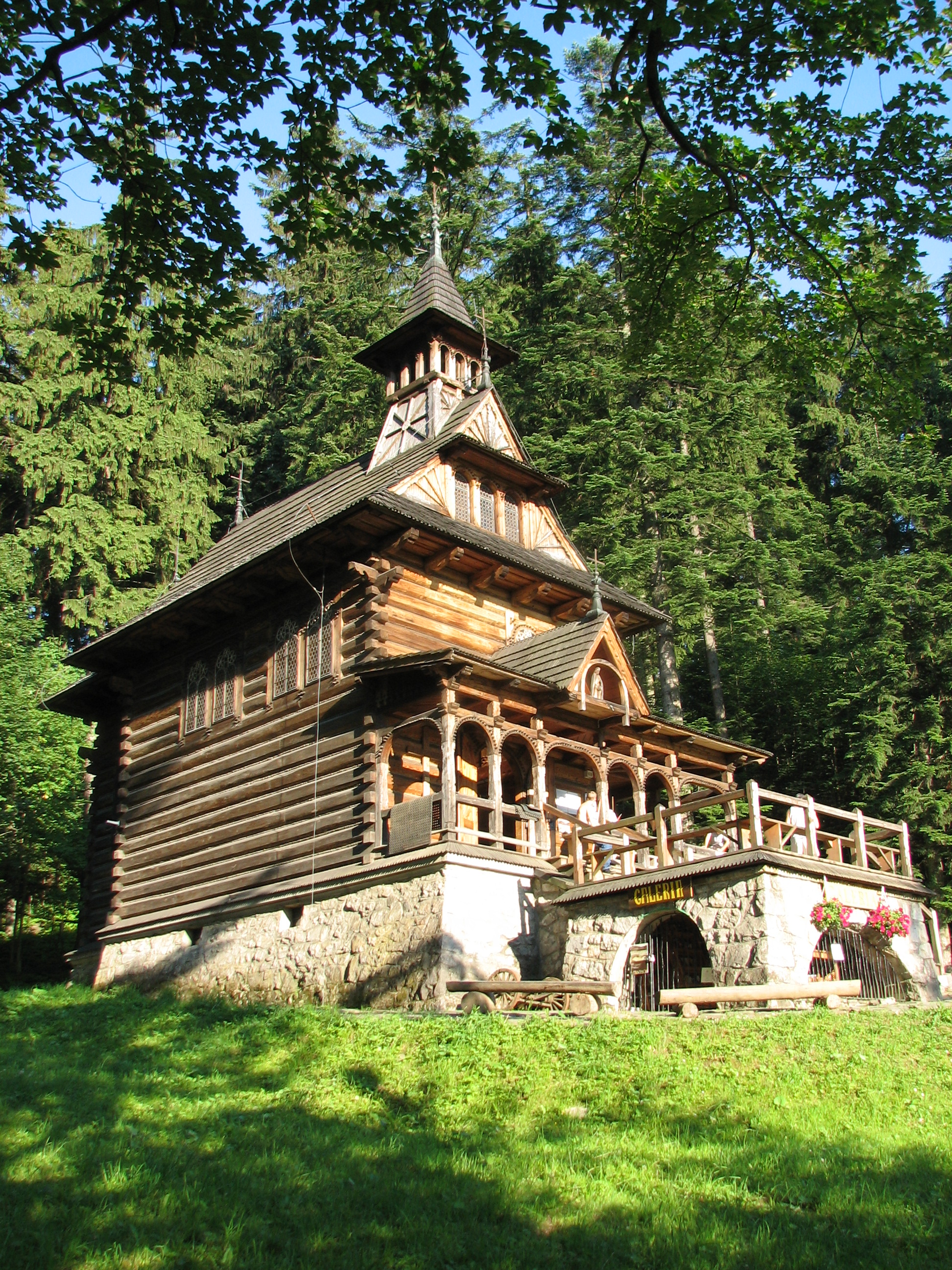
Chapel at Jaszczurówka

Stanislaw Witkiewicz once wrote on the idea of the Zakopane style:

The idea was not to build yet one more beautiful, typical house. The focus was something else entirely: to build a home which would settle all existing doubts about the possibility of adapting folk architecture to the requirements deriving from the more complex and sophisticated needs of comfort and beauty. To design a home that would inherently withstand all common grievances and undermine all customary prejudices. To erect a house that would prove that one can have a home, a dwelling in the dominant style of Zakopane and yet be confident that this home will not disintegrate, that it will effectively protect one from storms, gales and the cold, that it will possess the full range of comforts yet simultaneously be beautiful in a fundamentally Polish way.

The Zakopane style soon found proponents among other outstanding architects, including Jan Witkiewicz-Koszyc, Wladyslaw Matlakowski, and Walery Eliasz-Radzikowski.

== Decorative Arts and Furnishing ==
The Zakopane Style was not limited to architecture; it also appeared prominently in decorative arts. One of the earliest manifestations of Podhale decoration in the arts was through carvings on wooden furnishings such as chairs, beds, and screens. From 1887, the Zakopane Professional School for Woodworking helped facilitate this decorative fashion, which became known as the Zakopane Style. Witkiewicz criticized a great deal of this furniture, stating that it ignored the traditional shapes embraced by the highlanders. In a period of little more than a decade, Zakopane-type furniture—partially created by Witkiewicz—began to appear in villas such as Koliba, Pepita, Korwinówka (later Oksza), Zofiówka, and Pod Jedlami. The furniture was designed to match villa architecture, and every element was decorated or carved in a highlander manner, producing interiors much more luxurious than those previously encountered in ordinary huts.

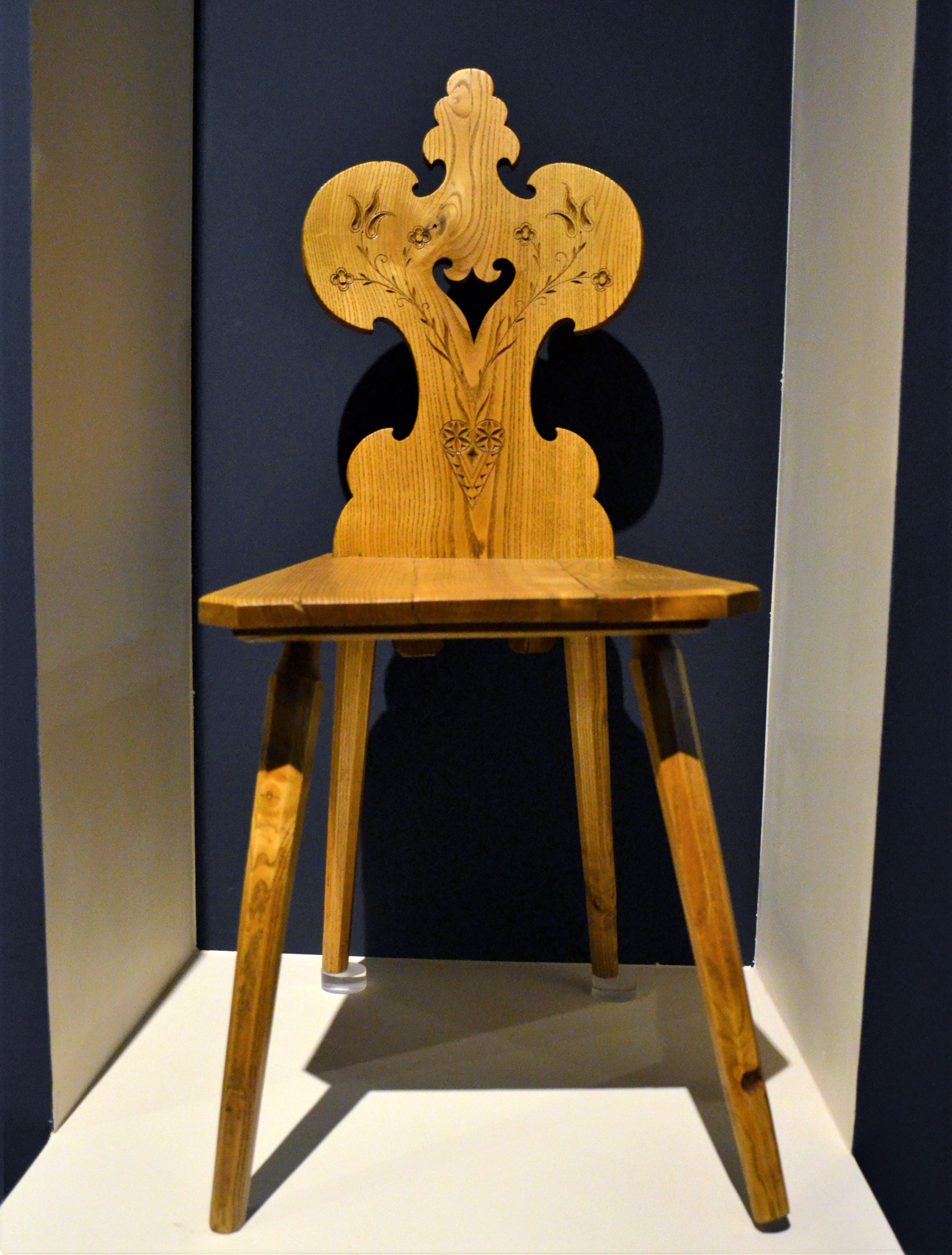
Zakopane style chair from the Villa Koliba

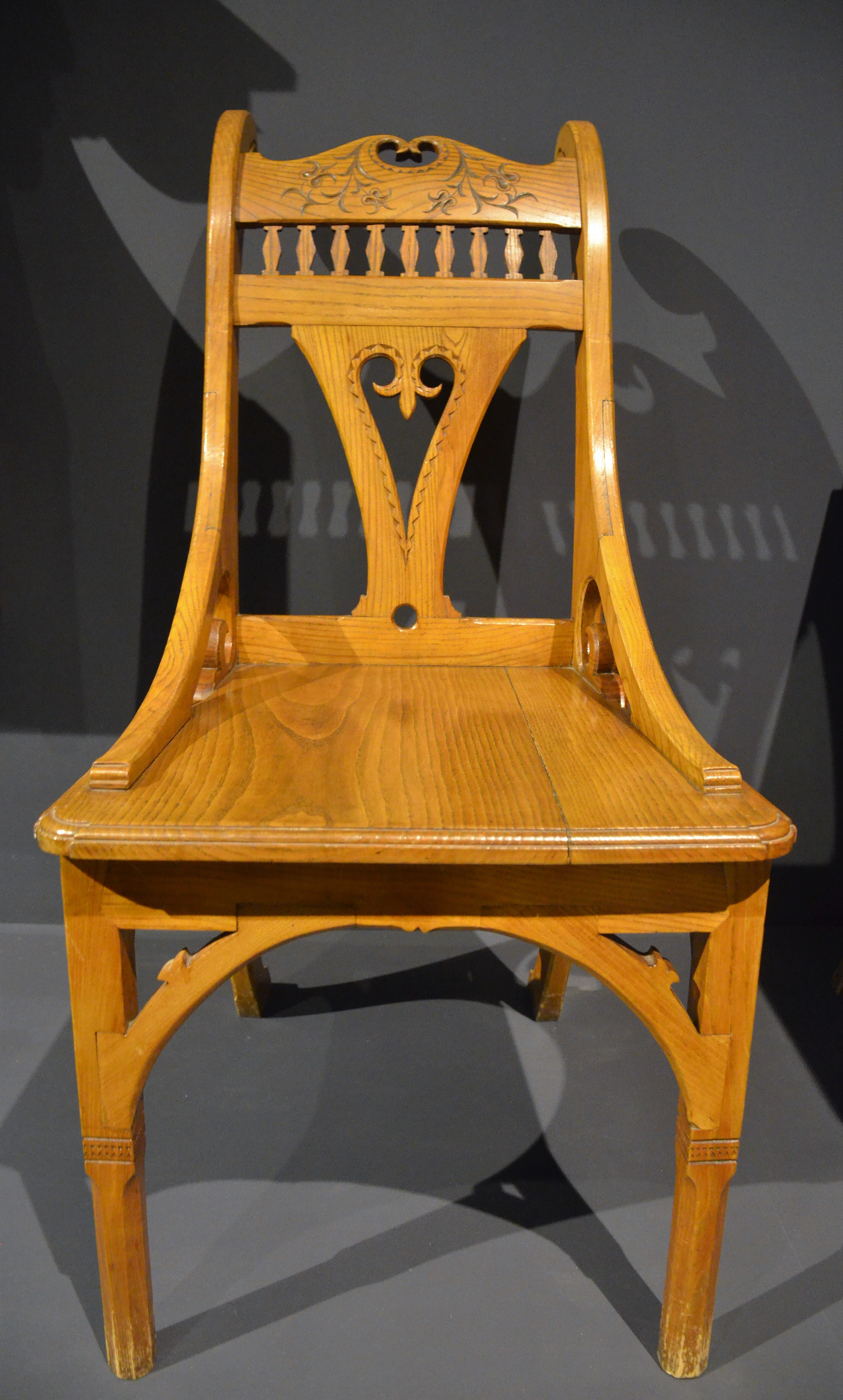
Zakopane style chair, before 1918

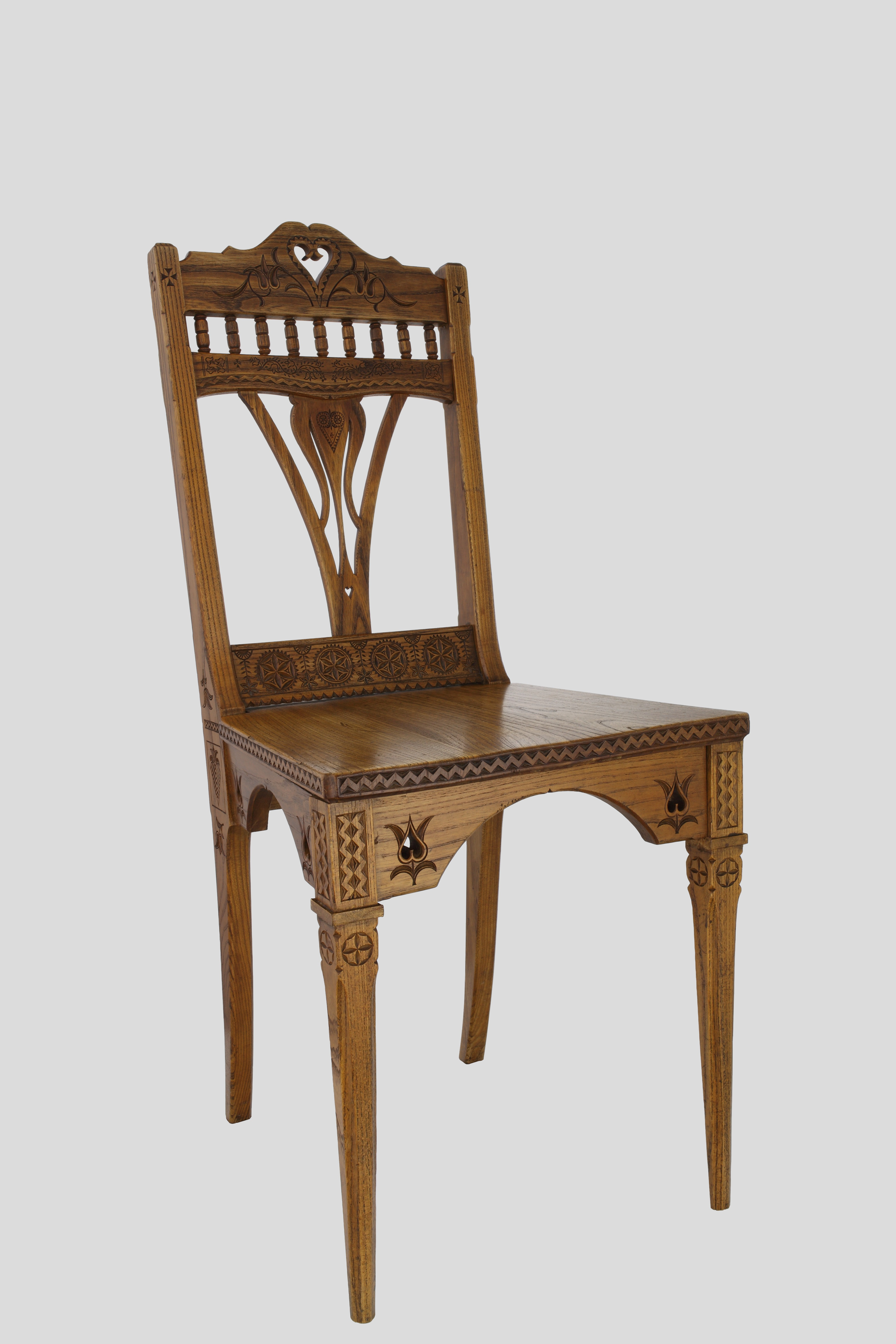
Zakopane style chair

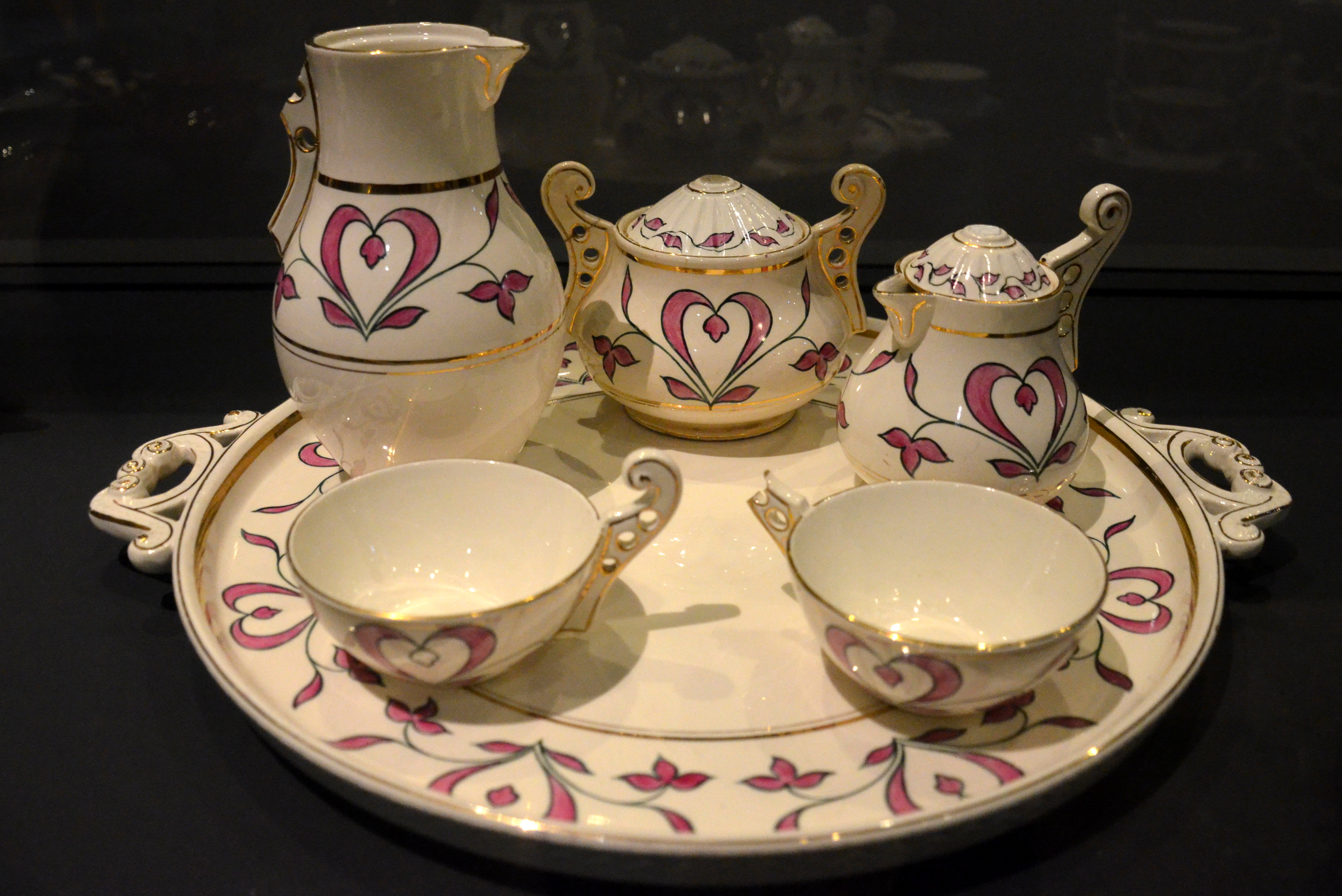
Zakopane style tableware set, before 1918

== In the brick architecture ==
The Zakopane Style was initially typical for the wooden architecture, but soon it was also developed in the brick architecture. The most important examples in Podhale are the Tatra Museum, Dworzec Tatrzański and Grand Hotel Stamary in Zakopane and the Military Sanatorium in Kościelisko.

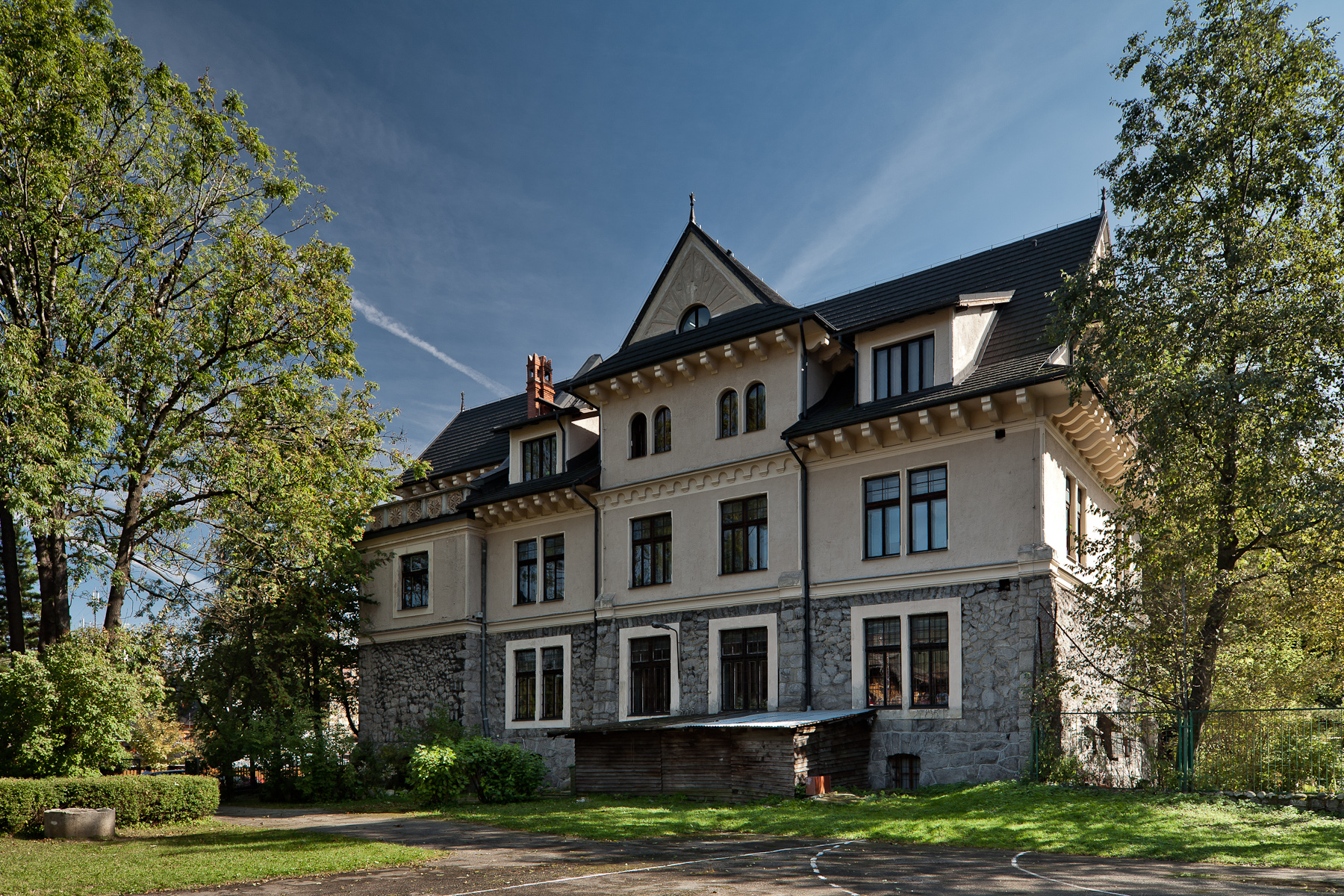
The Tatra Museum in Zakopane

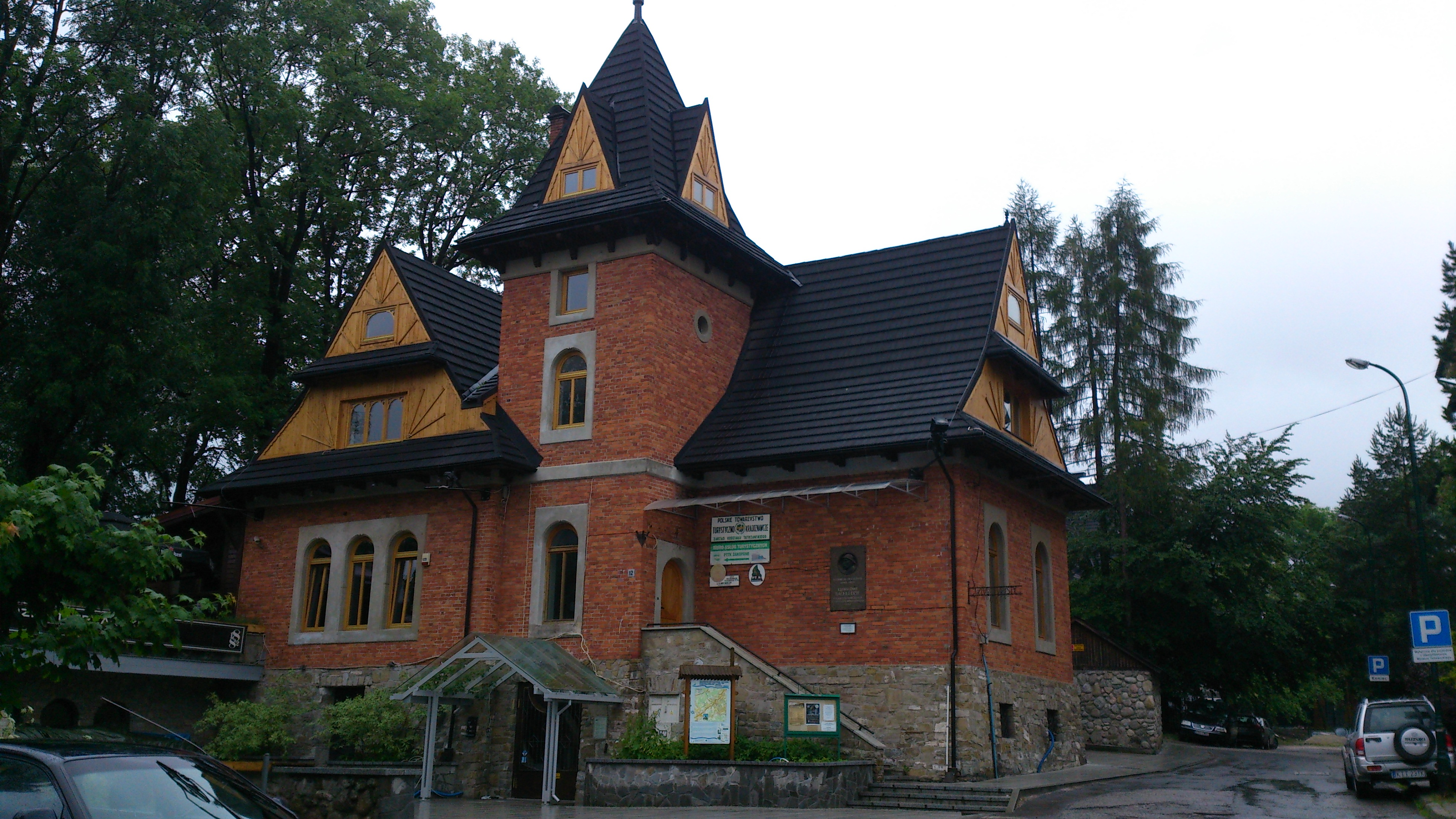
Dworzec Tatrzański in Zakopane

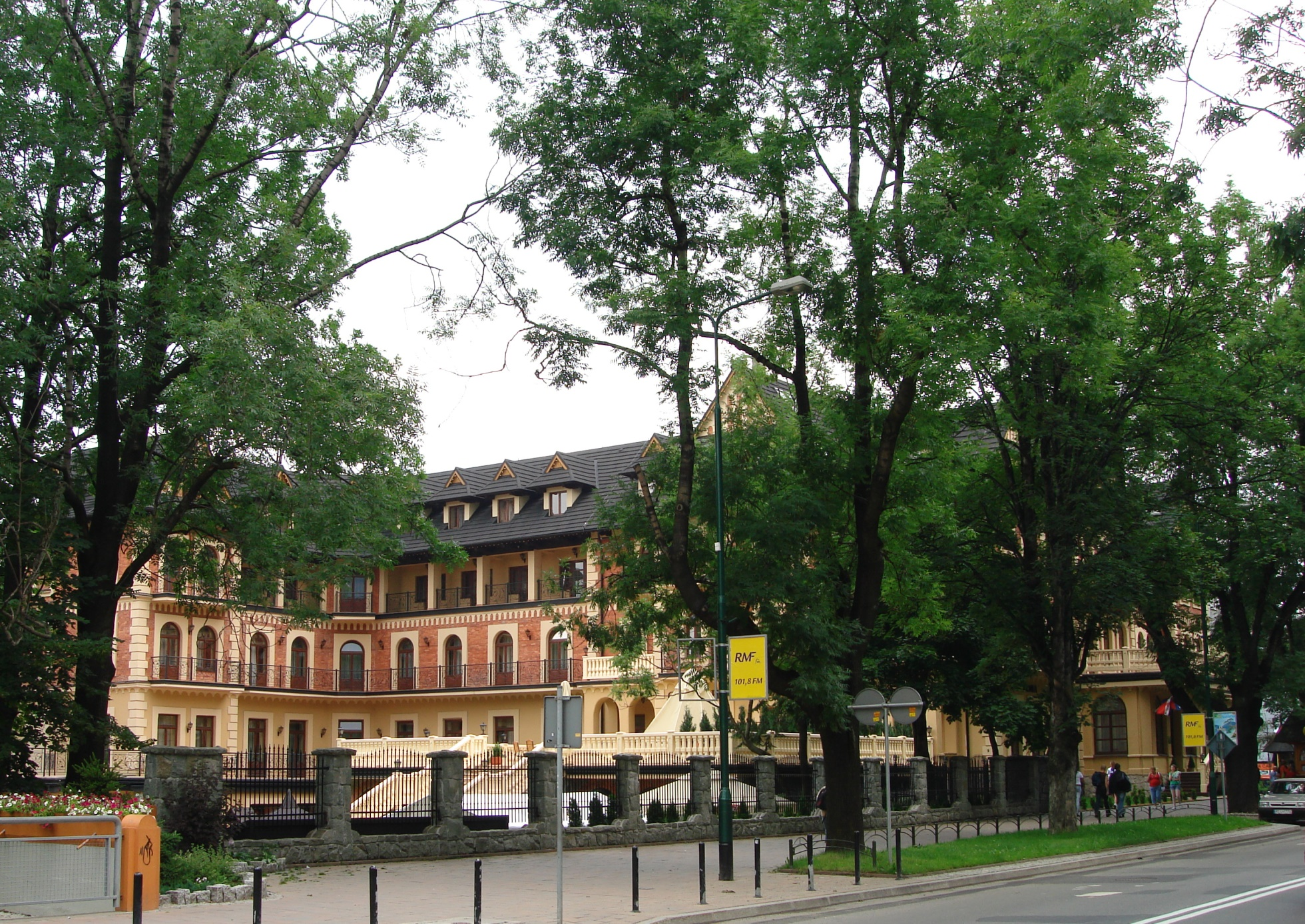
Grand Hotel Stamary in Zakopane

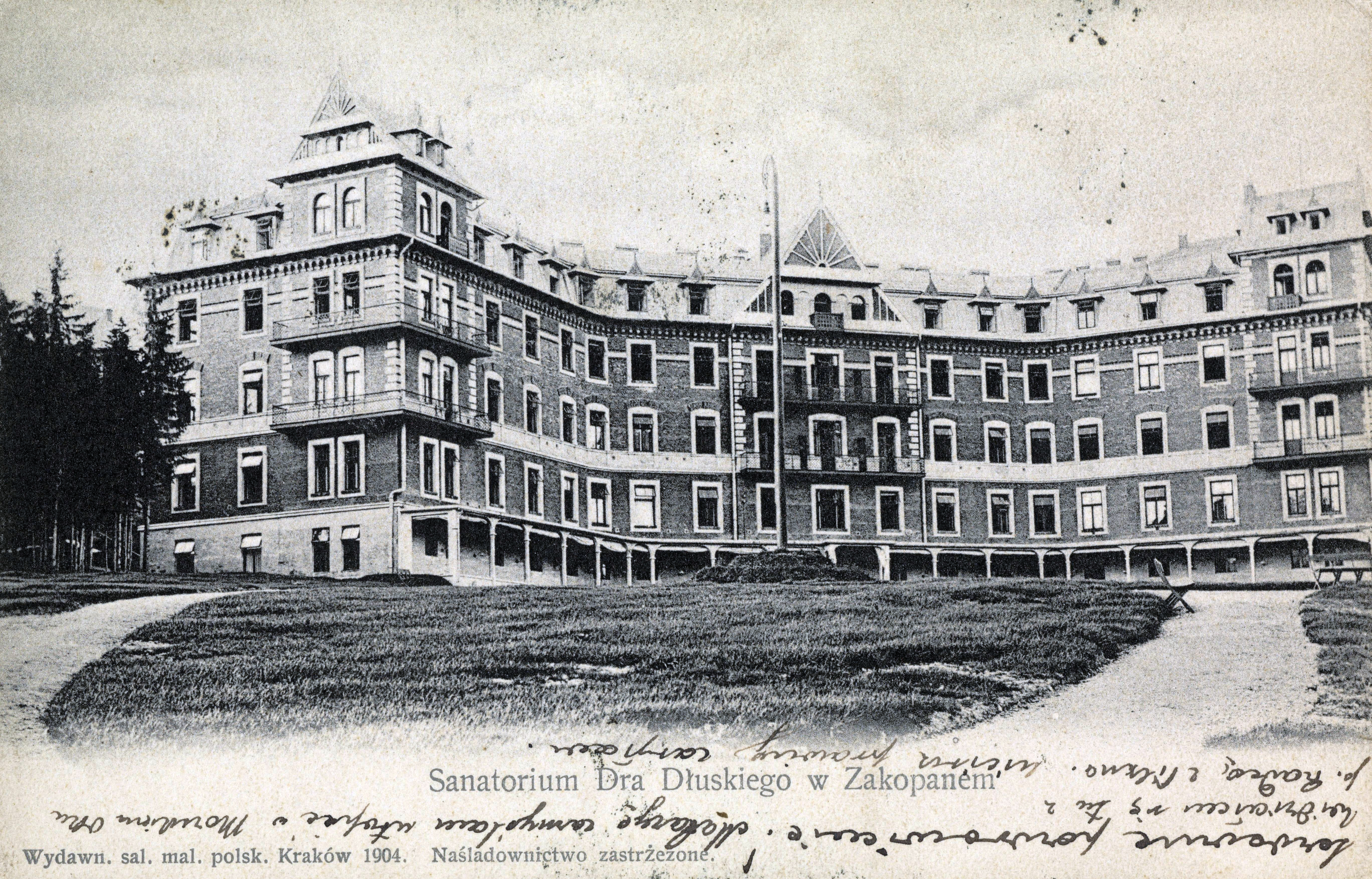
Military Sanatorium in Kościelisko

== Outside the Polish highlands ==
The Zakopane style also gained popularity beyond the Polish highlands. In 1900, the young Kraków-based architect Franciszek Mączyński won an international architectural competition organized by the Paris-based magazine Moniteur des Architectes with a design of a villa in the Zakopane style. There was also the Dom Ludowy in Sosnowiec, the Chata built for author Stefan Żeromski in Nałęczów, a series of villas in Wisła, Konstancin-Jeziorna, Anin and Vilnius, as well as the train station in Saldutiškis, Lithuania.

There were also some attempts to adapt the style to brick construction. Examples include Czeslaw Domaniewski's design for a series of train stations, the townhouses located at 30 Chmielna Street in Warsaw and at 38 Pekarska Street in Lviv as well as a brick tenement by Jan Starowicz dubbed "Beneath the Góral" in Łódź.

Additionally, the Góral diaspora has incorporated the norms and designs of the Zakopane Style of Architecture into homes, chapels and community buildings that serve their community, such as the Polish Highlanders Alliance of North America in Chicago, or the chapel on the grounds of the Polish National Alliance's Youth Camp in Yorkville.

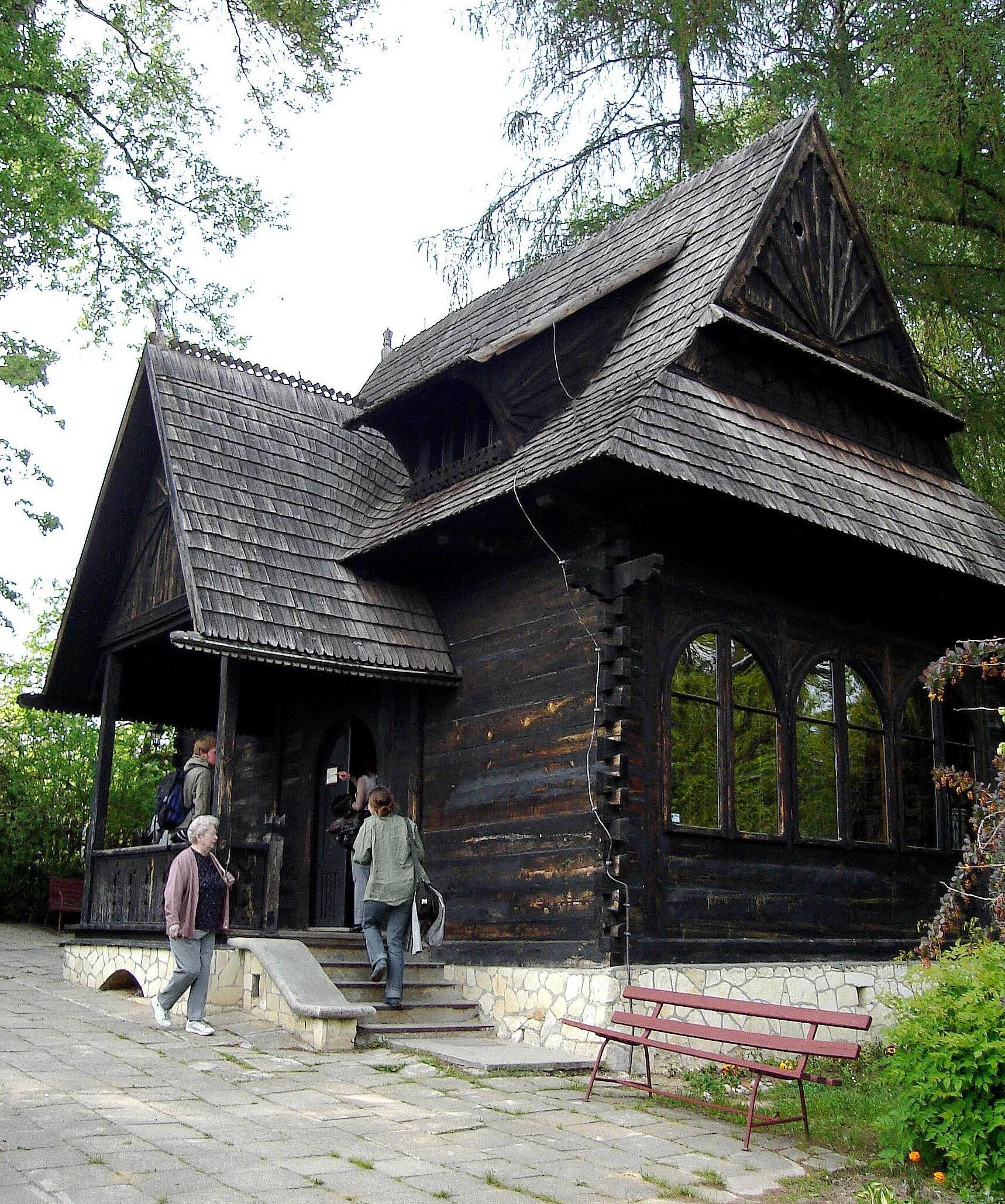
Żeromski's Chata in Nałęczów

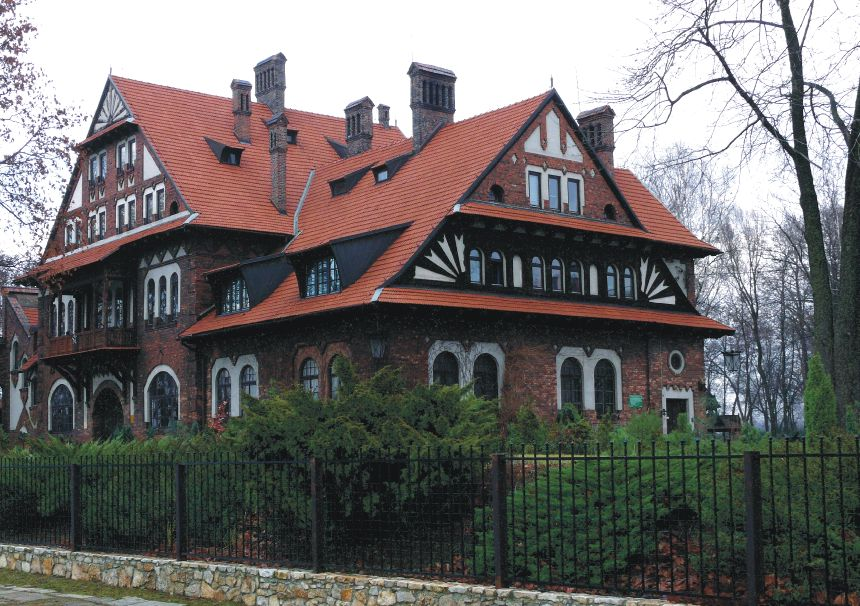
Dom Ludowy in Sosnowiec

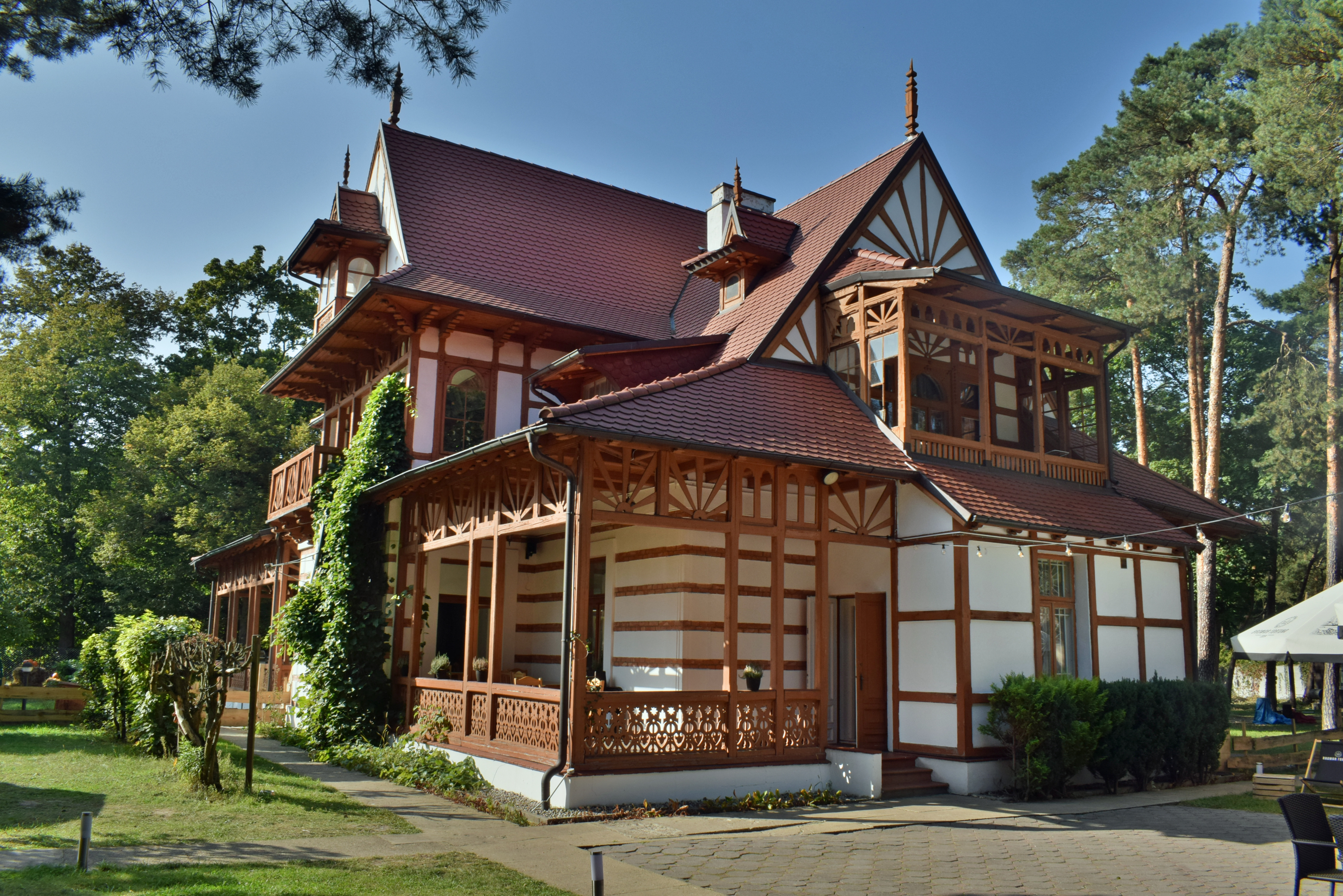
Villa Jutrzenka in Konstancin-Jeziorna

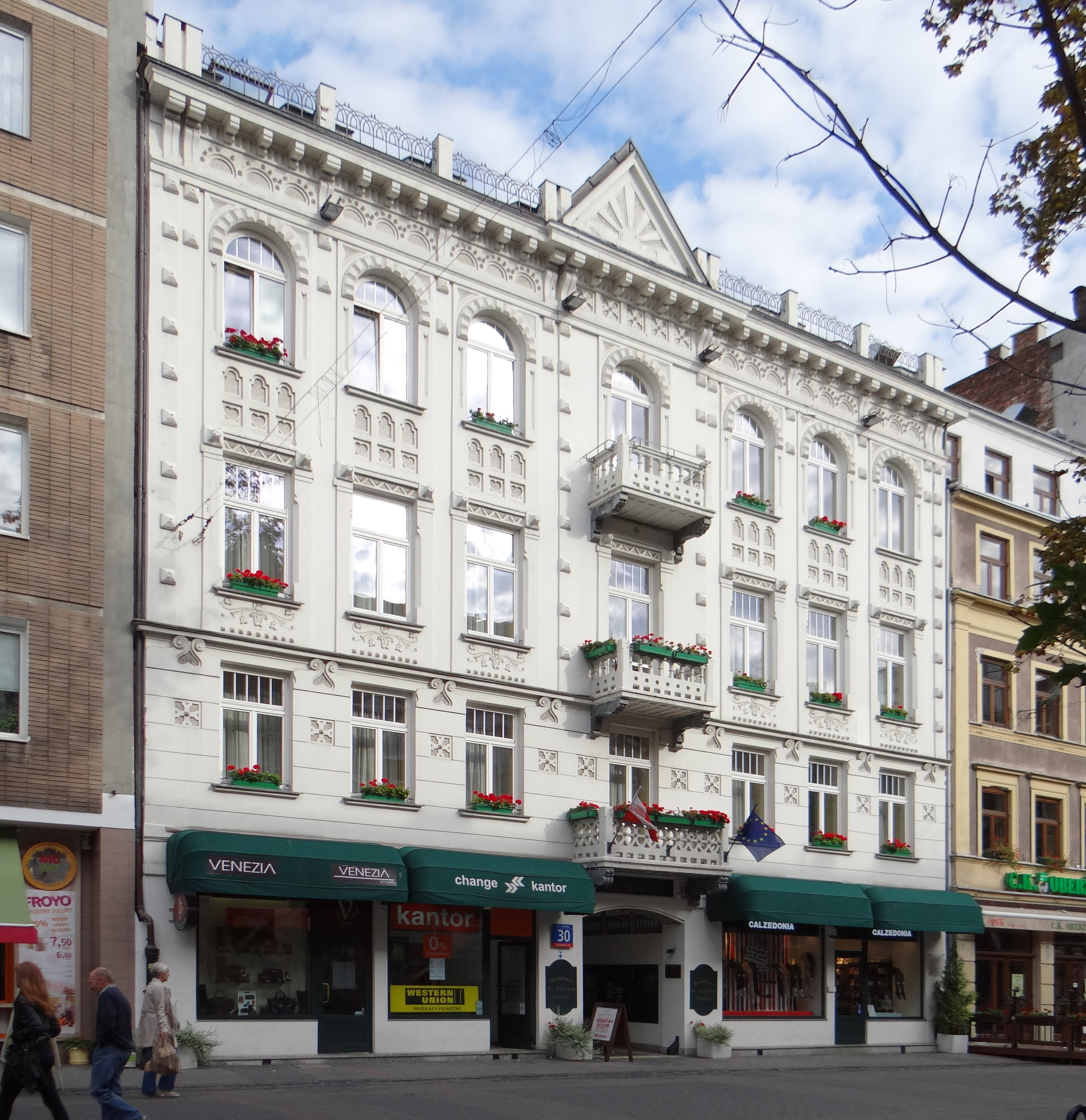
House at 30 Chmielna Street in Warsaw

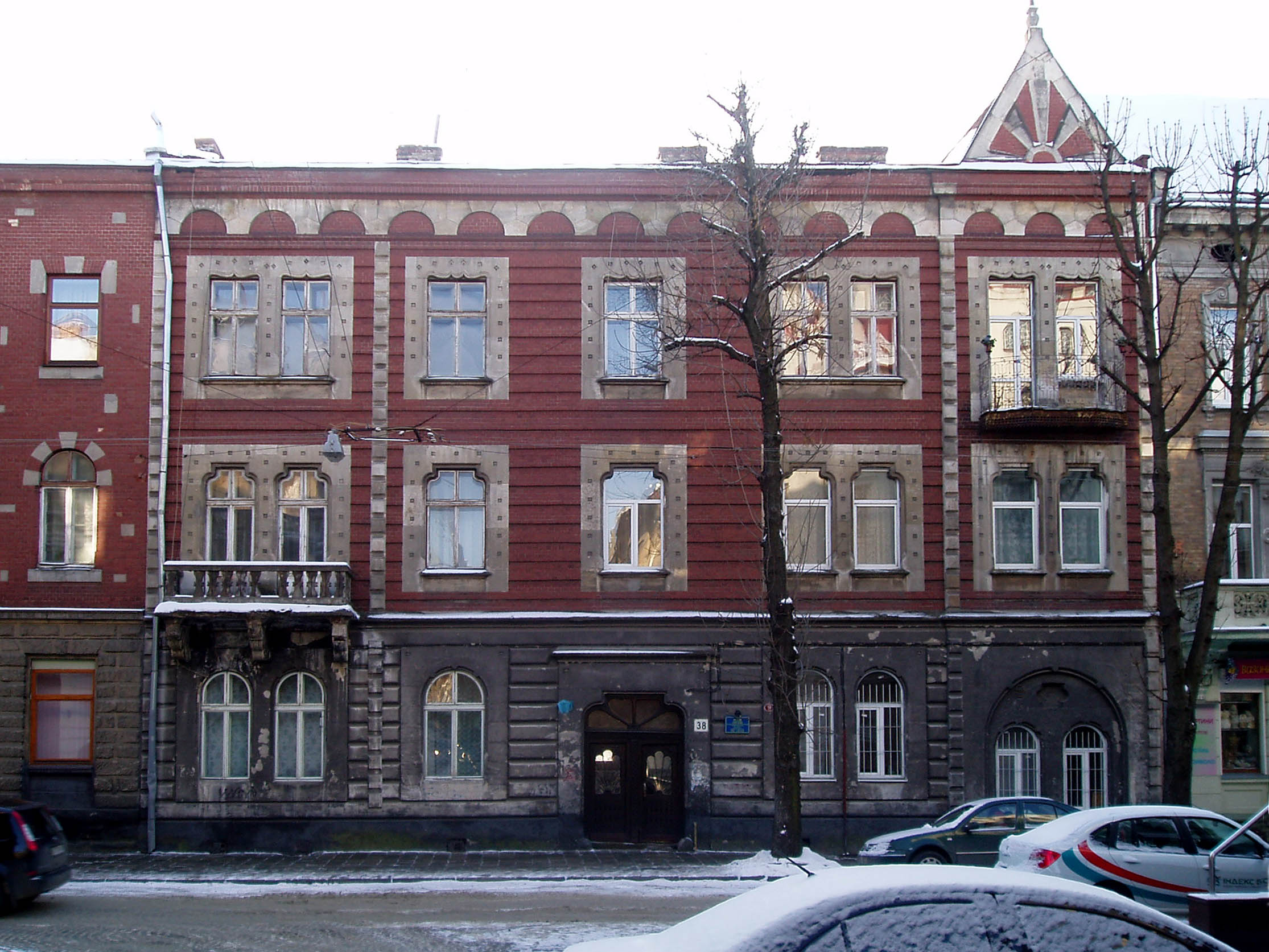
House at 38 Pekarska Street in Lviv

== Today ==
The Zakopane style dominated architecture in the Podhale and other Goral Lands for many years. Although the cutoff date for buildings designed in the Zakopane Style of Architecture is usually held to be 1914, many new pensions, villas and highlander homes are built according to the architectural model devised by Witkiewicz to the present day. Witkiewicz's dream of Zakopane Style spreading throughout the country did not materialize. His effort did, however, inspire the rest of the country to design their own local styles using their own folk ways. There was also a period of Neo-Zakopane Style in the 1950s during the Socialist realism, represented by such constructions like the Tourist hostel Dom Turysty in Zakopane (1949–1952) and several mountain huts, eg. in Dolina Pięciu Stawów Polskich (1947–1953) or in Chochołowska Polana (1951–1953). The museum of the Zakopane Style of Architecture located in the Villa "Koliba" first designed by Witkiewicz provides visitors with information on the Zakopane style.

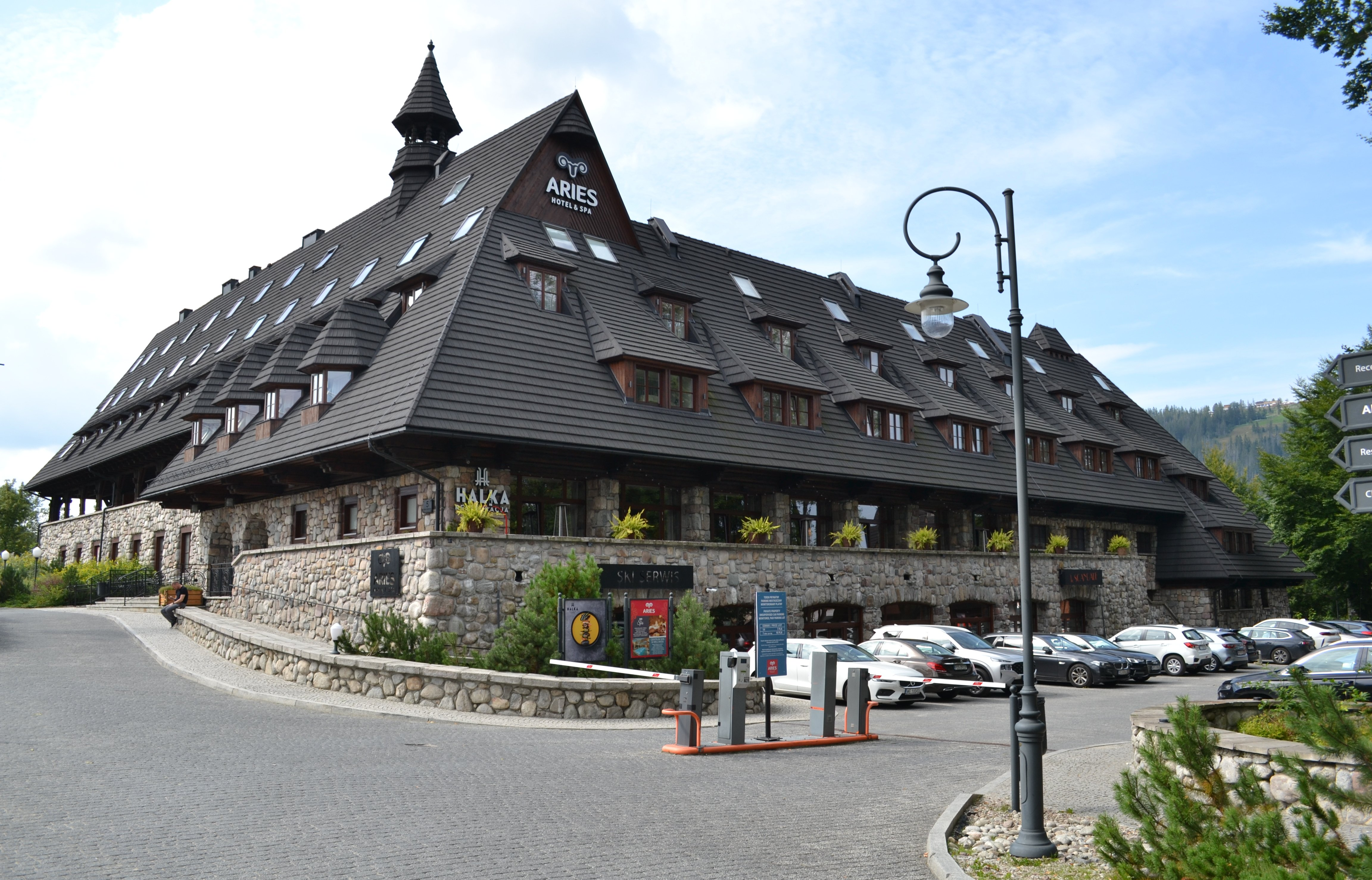
Tourist hostel Dom Turysty in Zakopane

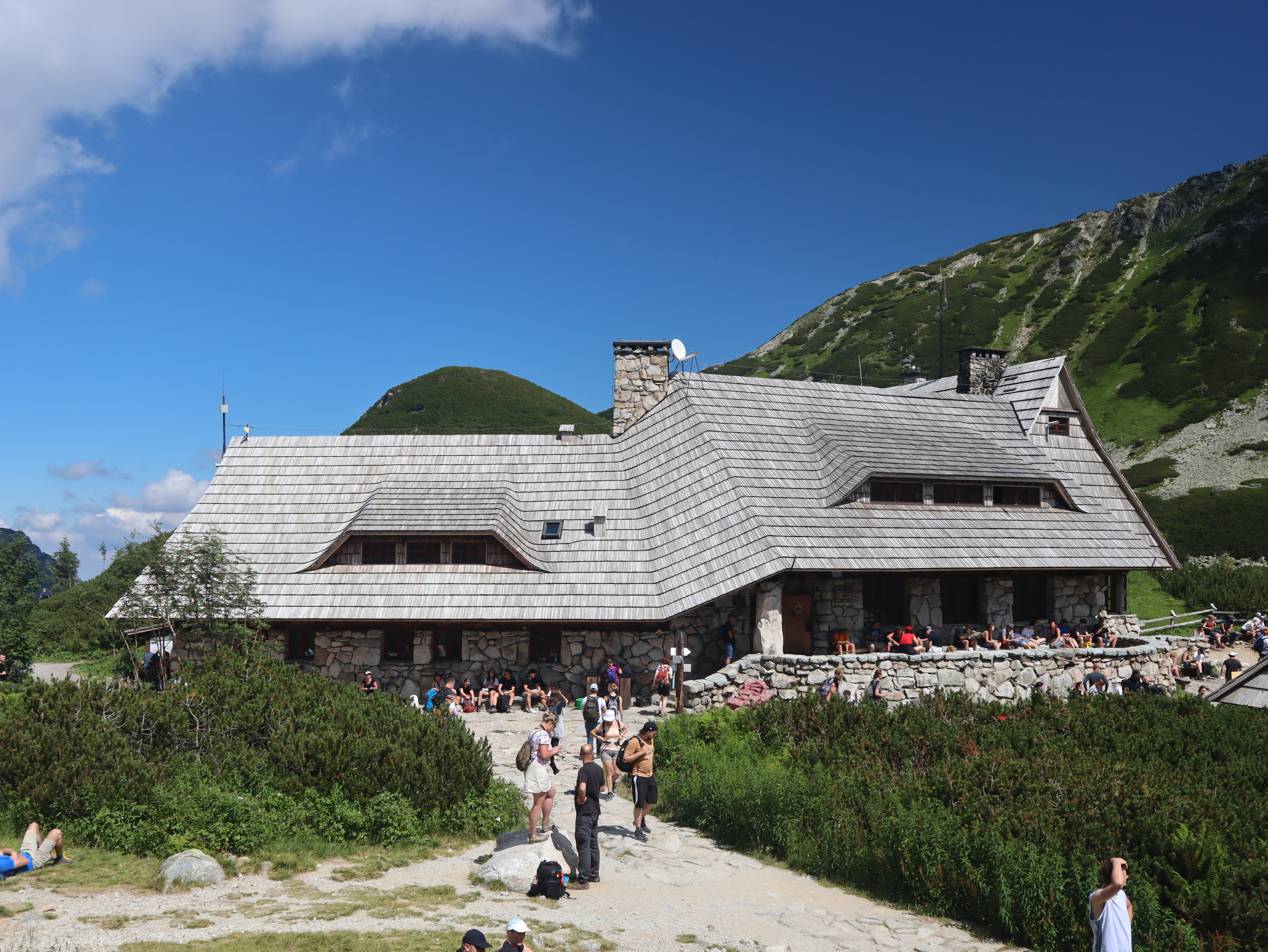
Mountain hut in Dolina Pięciu Stawów Polskich

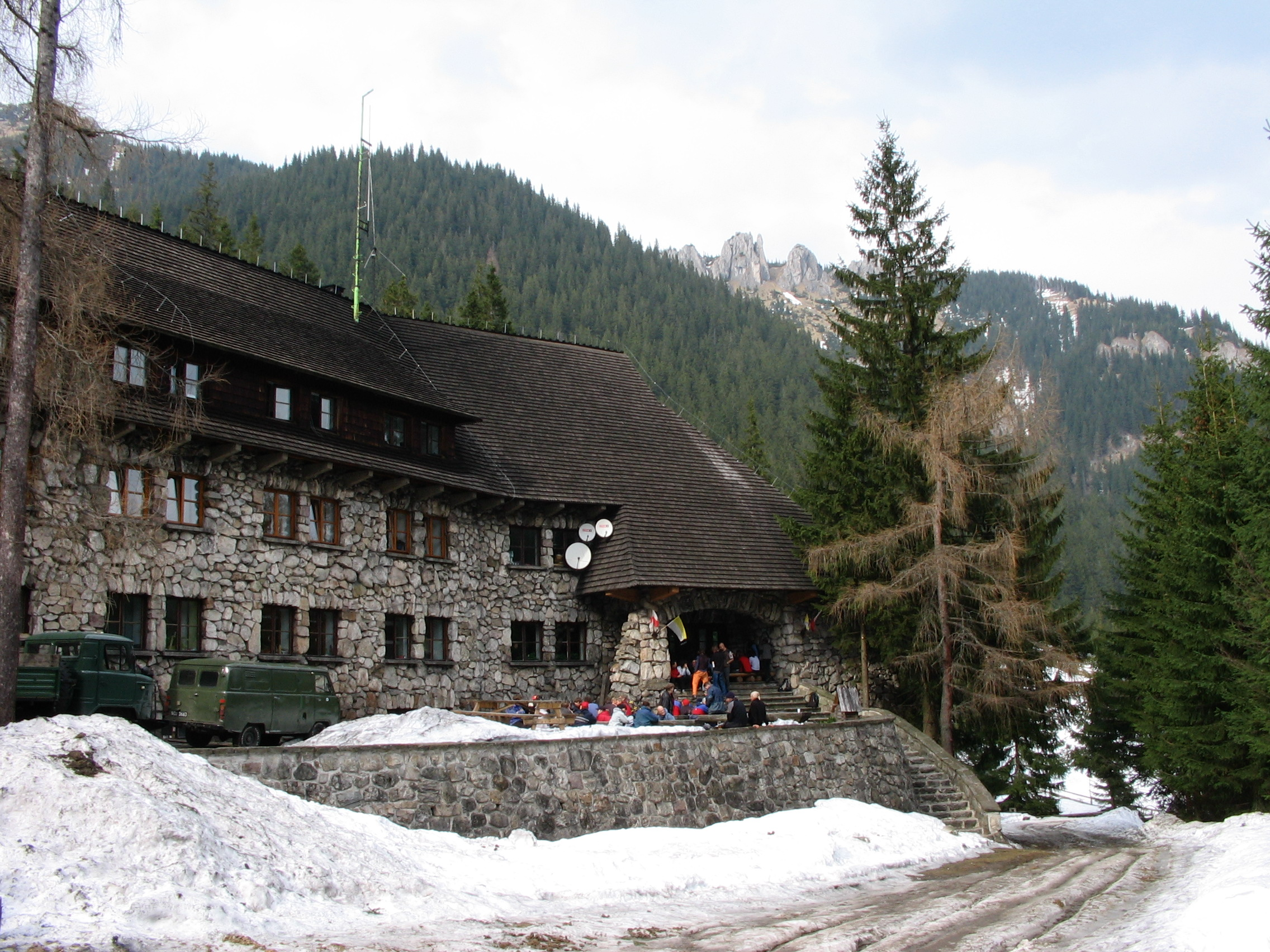
Mountain hut in Chochołowska Polana

== See also ==
- Polish Highlanders Alliance of North America
- Sanctuary of Our Lady of Ludźmierz
