= Museum of Zakopane Style at Villa Koliba =

Museum in Zakopane, Poland

Coordinates: 49.2943°N 19.9429°E

The Museum od Zakopane Style at Villa Koliba
- Muzeum stylu zakopiańskiego w willi "Koliba"
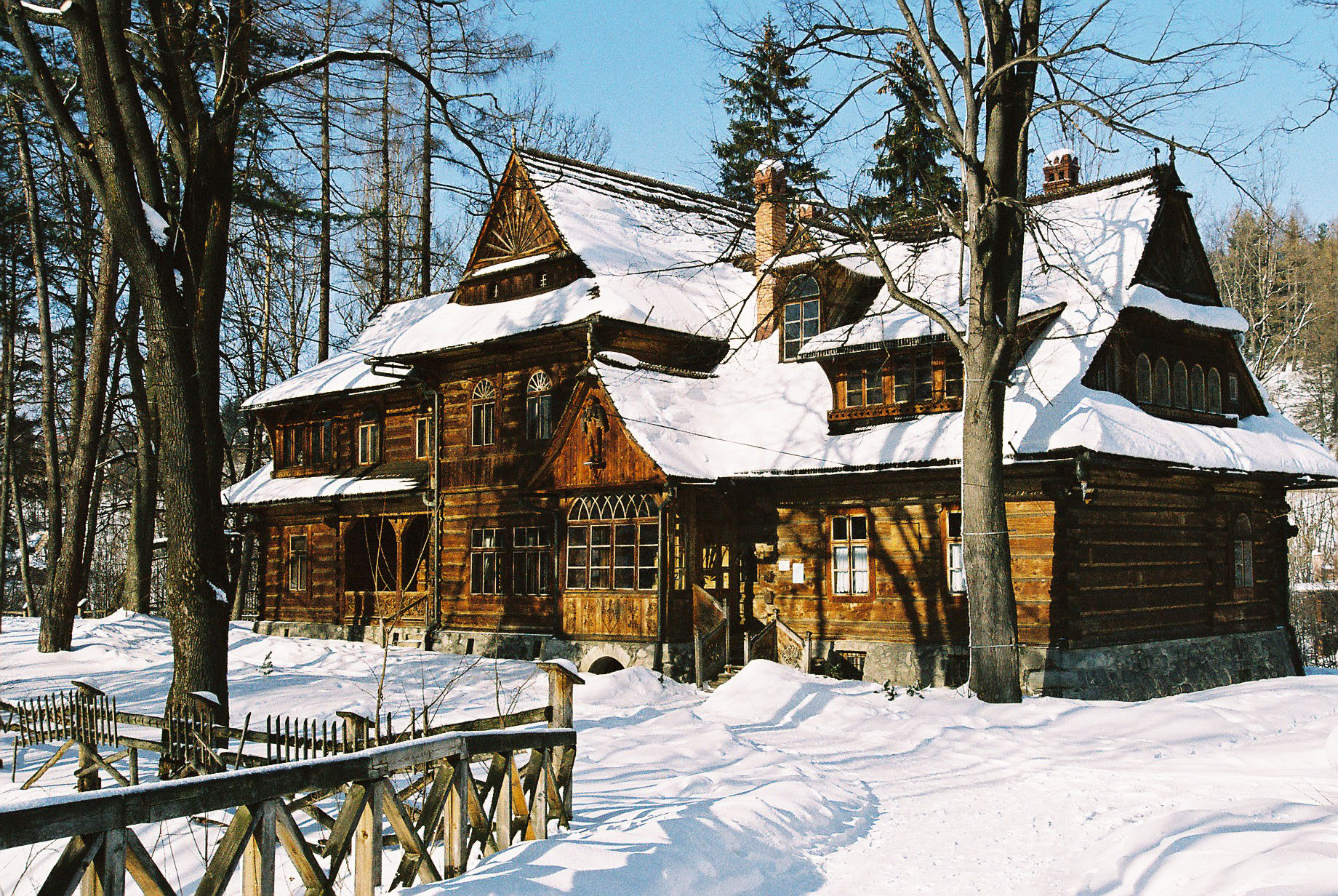
- Established: 1993
- Type: Public museum
- Collections: Ethnography

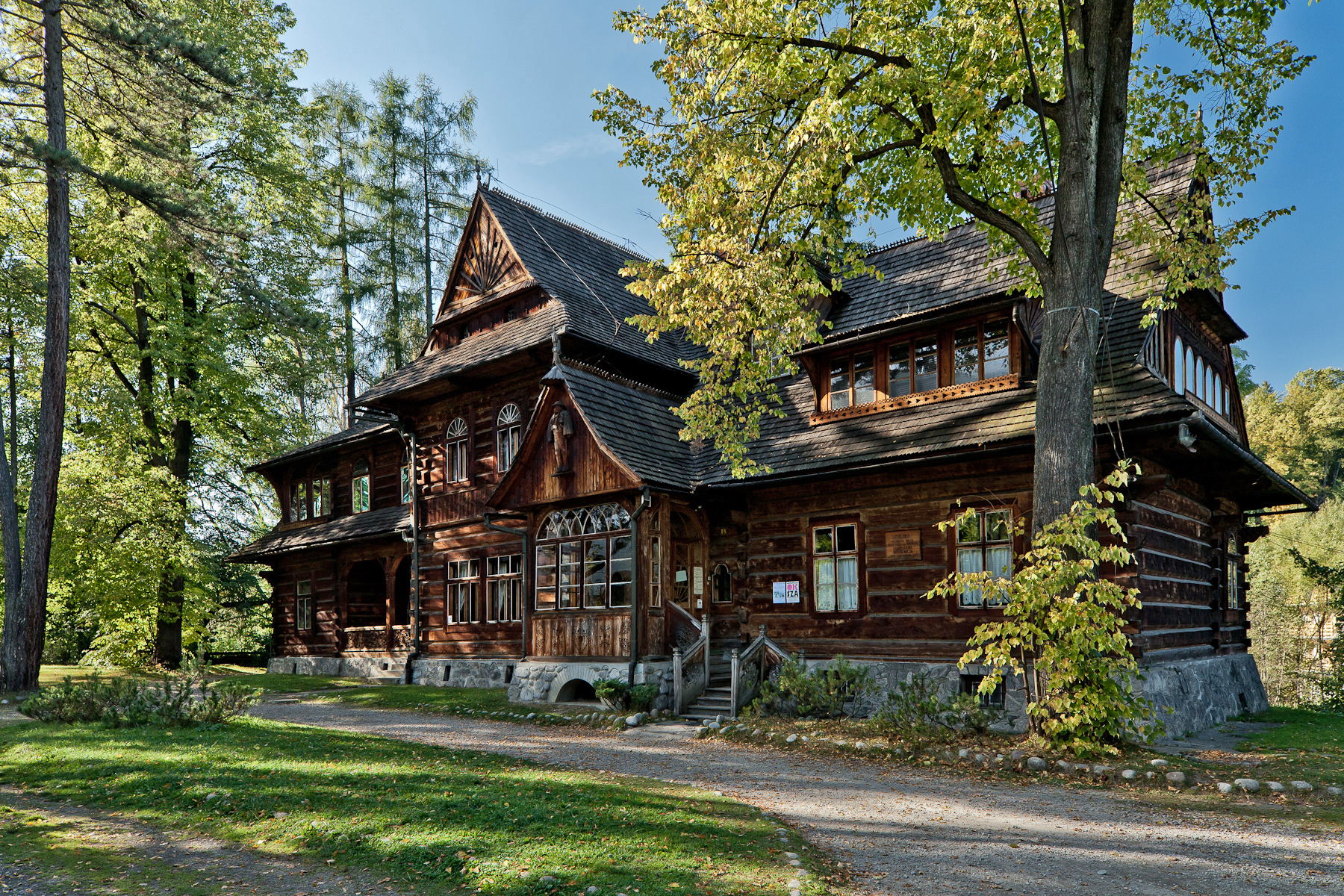
Museum of Zakopane Style at Villa Koliba

The Museum of Zakopane Style at Villa Koliba is a division of the Tatra Museum in Zakopane, and a museum of Zakopane style.

The villa was built between 1892 and 1893 in Zakopane style based on a design by Stanisław Witkiewicz. It was the first building ever erected in Zakopane style. The Koliba Villa is a registered Polish monument since 1983. The name koliba originates from the same word in Polish Goral regional dialect meaning a shepherds' hut.

== History ==
The villa was built for Zygmunt Gnatowski. Gnatowski needed a building where he could store his collection of ethnographic artifacts. Originally he aimed to build a simple hut based on existing Podhale architecture, but was convinced by Stanisław Witkiewicz to instead have a house in the newly emerging Zakopane style built instead. Witkiewicz, already a well-known artist, draughtsman and playwright, was eager to introduce a new local style of architecture to the region when he noticed that wealthy local residents began erecting houses in the Swiss folk style. Witkiewicz was aiming to introduce a national variety of rustic architecture to Poland, and based his sketches on local decorative motifs.

Sketches of Koliba Villa were made in 1891 and it was then built by local workers in 1892–1893 in Zakopane at Kościeliska street.

== Museum of Zakopane style ==
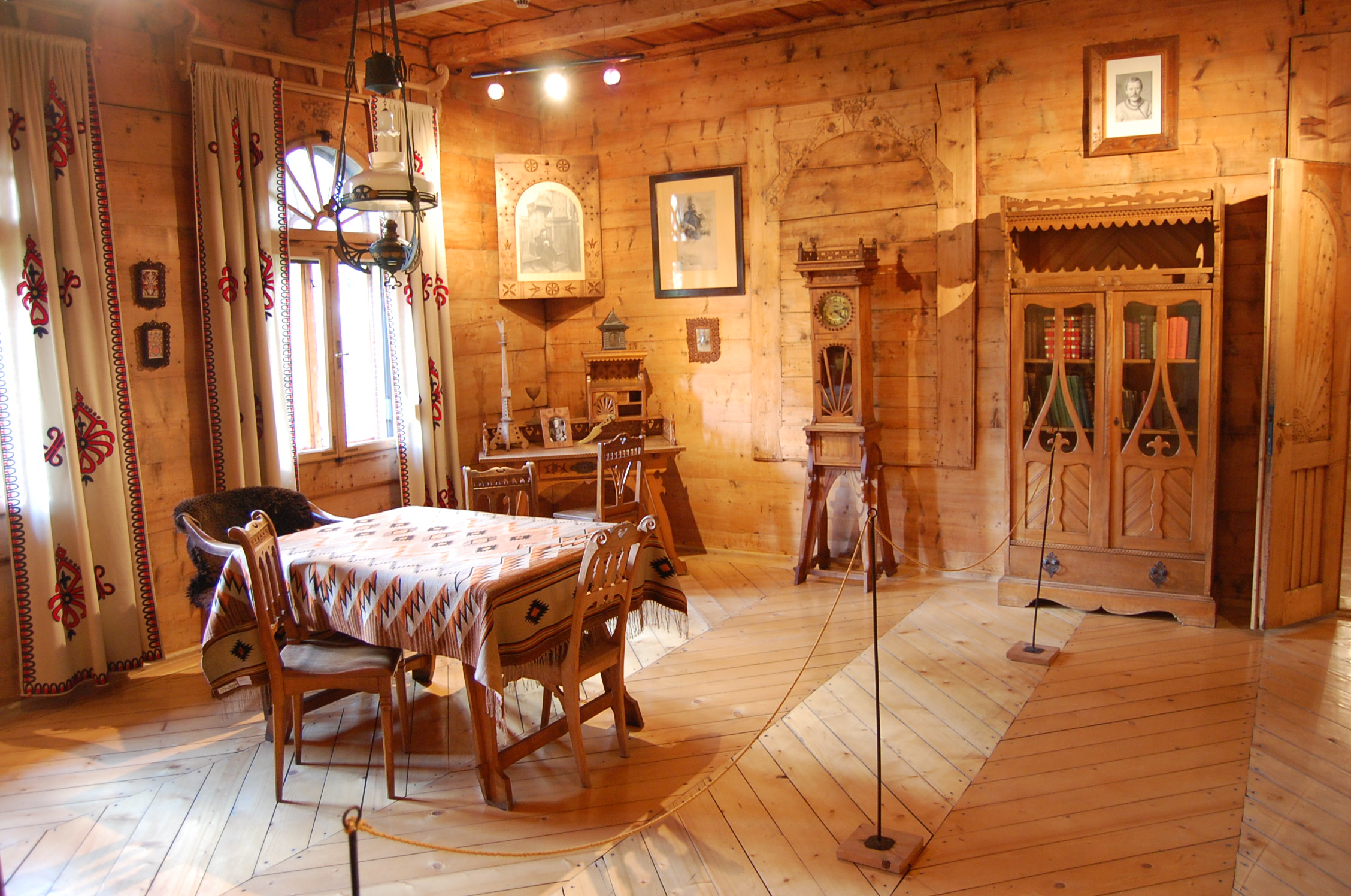
Villa Koliba - interior

The Villa Koliba has been functioning as the Museum of Zakopane Style since December 4, 1993– a branch of the Tatra Museum in Zakopane.

The five rooms in the original part of the building are arranged in accordance with their original function they performed when Gnatowski owned the building. On the ground floor visitors can see the dining room, drawing room and bedroom, and on the top floor – Gnatowski’s room and the servant’s room.

The ethnographic collection assembled by Gnatowski can be seen in the "Tatra highlander’s chamber", which presents furniture, objects, utensils and artisan objects made in Zakopane style at the end of the 19th century and the beginning of the 20th century. Many of these objects were made based on Stanisław Witkiewicz's designs.
