= Stanisław Witkiewicz =

Polish artist, writer and architect

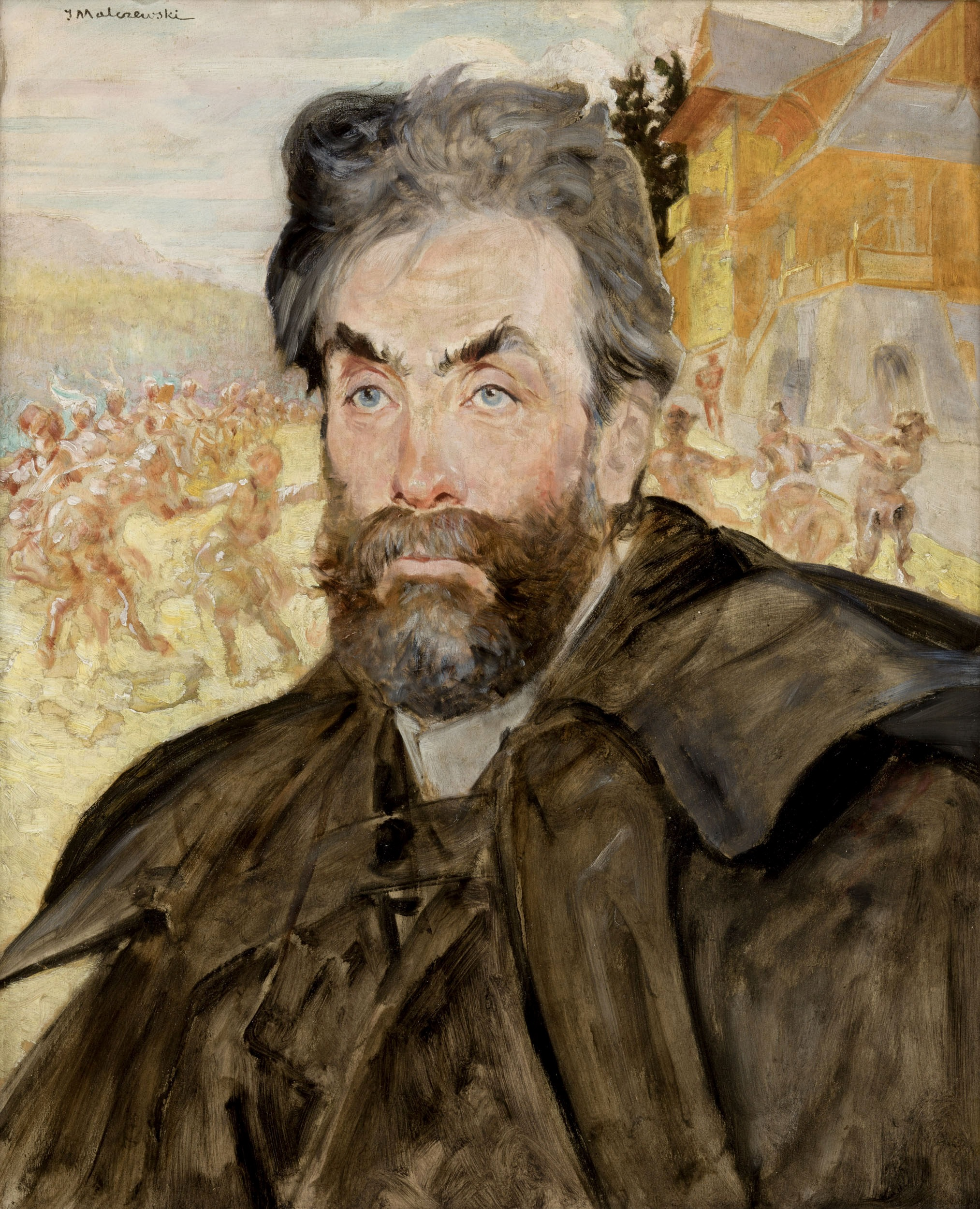
- Stanisław Witkiewicz. Portrait by Jacek Malczewski, 1897, National Museum, Kraków.
- Born: 8 May 1851; Pašiaušė, Russian Empire (present-day Lithuania)
- Died: 5 September 1915 (aged 64); Lovran, Austria-Hungary (present-day Croatia)
- Education: Academy of Arts, St. Petersburg; Academy of Fine Arts, Munich
- Known for: Painting, architecture
- Style: Zakopane Style
- Spouse: Maria Pietrzkiewicz
- Children: Stanisław Ignacy Witkiewicz

Stanisław Witkiewicz (Lithuanian: Stanislovas Vitkevičius; 8 May 1851 – 5 September 1915) was a Polish painter, art theoretician, and amateur architect, known for his creation of "Zakopane Style".

== Life ==
Witkiewicz was born in the Samogitian village of Pašiaušė (Polish: Poszawsze), present-day Lithuania, ruled at the time by the Russian Empire. His parents were Ignacy and Elwira Witkiewicz. Elwira came from a wealthy Szemiot family and grew up in a palace in Diktariškiai.

Ignacy Witkiewicz at the age of 17 was a participant in the November Uprising, and after it ended he settled on the family estate and took up agriculture. The legend of his brother Jan Prosper, sentenced to long-term military service for his patriotic activities at school age, was alive in the family. In the Russian army, he made a career as a researcher of Central Asia and a diplomat, and in the family tradition was considered a “Polish Wallenrod,” seeking to provoke a Russian-British conflict. Elwira's brother was Franciszek Szemiot, a commander in the November Uprising, then traveling the world looking for opportunities to fight for a free Poland, he was friends with Adam Mickiewicz and Juliusz Słowacki, the latter dedicated a poem to him. The memory of heroic family members influenced the patriotic atmosphere of the household.

Ignacy and Elwira had twelve children, the first daughter Elwira was born in 1840, followed by Angelika, Wiktor, Anna, Barbara, Jan, Ignacy, Stanisław, Maria, Aniela and Eugenia, born in 1856. Three daughters, Angelika, Anna and Justyna died in childhood.

The Witkiewicz family, especially Elwira, sought to raise the consciousness of the people, adhering to democratic views similar to those preached by Szymon Konarski's Association of the Polish People. Elwira founded a hospital for peasants in Pašiaušė and a school for their children, where her eldest daughter taught them in Polish and Lithuanian. Lithuanian was also taught to all the Witkiewicz children.

As an adolescent, he spent several years in Siberian Tomsk, where his parents and two older siblings were exiled for their support of the January Uprising. He was a student at the Academy of Fine Arts in Saint Petersburg (1868–1871) and furthered his education in Munich (1872–1875). During his stay in Munich, he befriended painters Aleksander Gierymski, Józef Chełmoński and Henryk Siemiradzki.

In 1875, he moved to Warsaw and set up a painting workshop in the laundry at the Hotel Europejski. In 1884, he married Maria Pietrzkiewicz. The pair had a son, Stanisław Ignacy. The son's godmother was the internationally famous actress Helena Modjeska, whom the elder Witkiewicz in 1876 had nearly accompanied to California in the United States.

In 1884–1887, Witkiewicz worked as the artistic director of "Wędrowiec" weekly, for which he wrote a series of articles concerning the values of a work of art and the role of art critics (published in book form under the title "Painting and criticism among us", Sztuka i krytyka u nas, in 1891 and 1899). In 1887, he held the same position in "Kłosy" magazine.

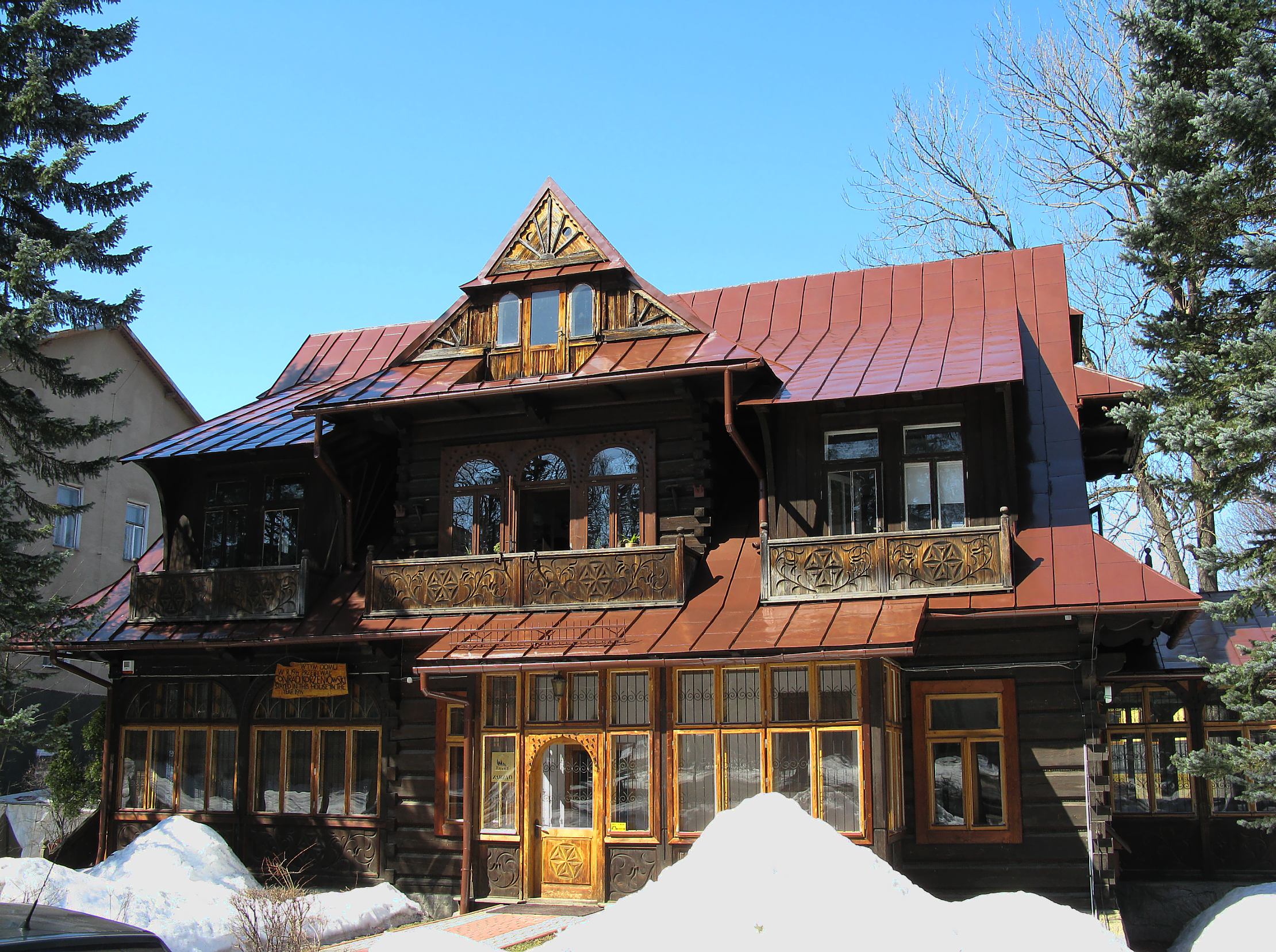
Villa Konstantynówka in Zakopane. Joseph Conrad stayed there in 1914

In 1886, he visited Zakopane for the first time. He developed a fascination with the Tatra Mountains, the Podhale highlanders and their vernacular traditions. His ambition became to create a Polish national style based on the highlanders' art, which he considered quintessentially Polish.

He formulated the Zakopane Style (styl zakopiański) (also known as Witkiewicz Style (styl witkiewiczowski)) in architecture, in which he designed homes and interiors for well-off, artistically-minded Poles including Bronisława Kondratowicz. He was strongly associated with Zakopane and promoted it in the art community.

Witkiewicz had strong views against formal education:

"School is completely at odds with the psychological make-up of human beings".

He applied this principle in his son's upbringing and was disappointed when the 20-year-old Witkacy chose to enroll at the Academy of Fine Arts in Kraków.

In 1908, suffering from tuberculosis, the elder Witkiewicz left his family in Zakopane and relocated to Lovran, a fashionable resort in what was then Austria-Hungary, which today is in Croatia. He died there in 1915.

His first monographic art exhibition was staged in Zachęta Fine Arts Society in 1927. His son, Stanisław Ignacy Witkiewicz, became a famous painter, playwright, novelist and philosopher, also known (from the conflation of his surname and middle name) by the pseudonym "Witkacy."

== Selected publications ==
- Odpowiedź na ankietę Policja a sztuka. Policja a sztuka (Response to the Survey The Police and Art) (1902), Krytyka IV: 275–280
- Chrześcijaństwo i katechizm. O nauce religii w szkołach galicyjskich (Christianity and the Catechism. About the Teaching of Religion in Galician Schools) (1904),
- Wallenrodyzm czy znikczemnienie (Wallenrodism or Becoming Ignoble) (published in Kultura Polski 1917, a fragment of the work Studium o duszy polskiej po 1863 roku (A Study of the Polish Soul after 1863),
- Przełom (Turning Point),
- Życie, etyka i rewolucja (Life, Ethics and Revolution),
- Na przełęczy. Wrażenia i obrazy z Tatr (On the Mountain Pass. Impressions and images from the Tatras) (1891, first published in Tygodnik Illustrowany 1889–1890),
- Po latach (Years Later) (1905),
- Z Tatr (From the Tatras) (1907),
- Monographs: Juliusz Kossak (1900), Aleksander Gierymski (1903), Matejko (1908).

== Selected paintings ==
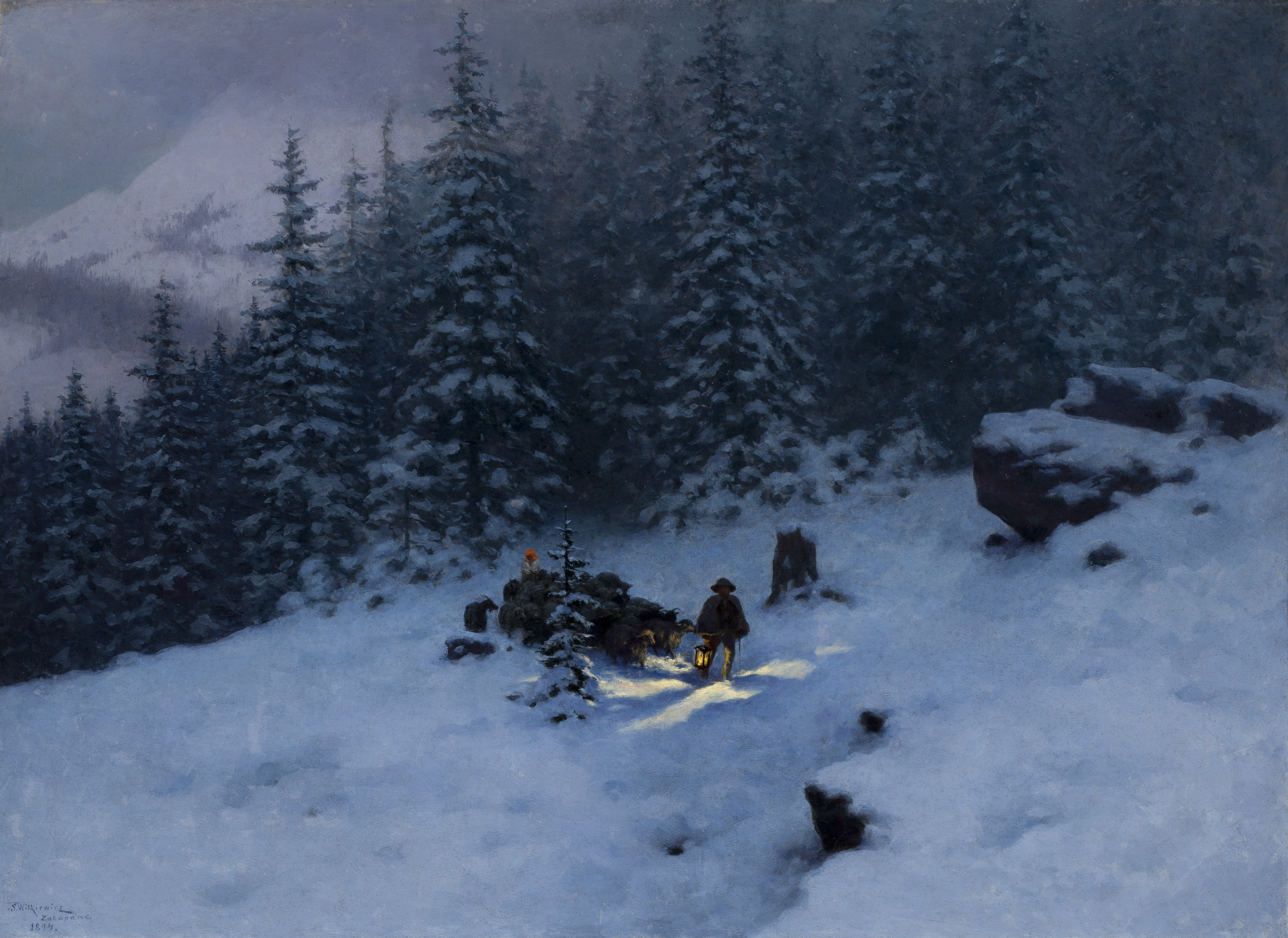
Autumn Pasturage, National Museum, Kraków

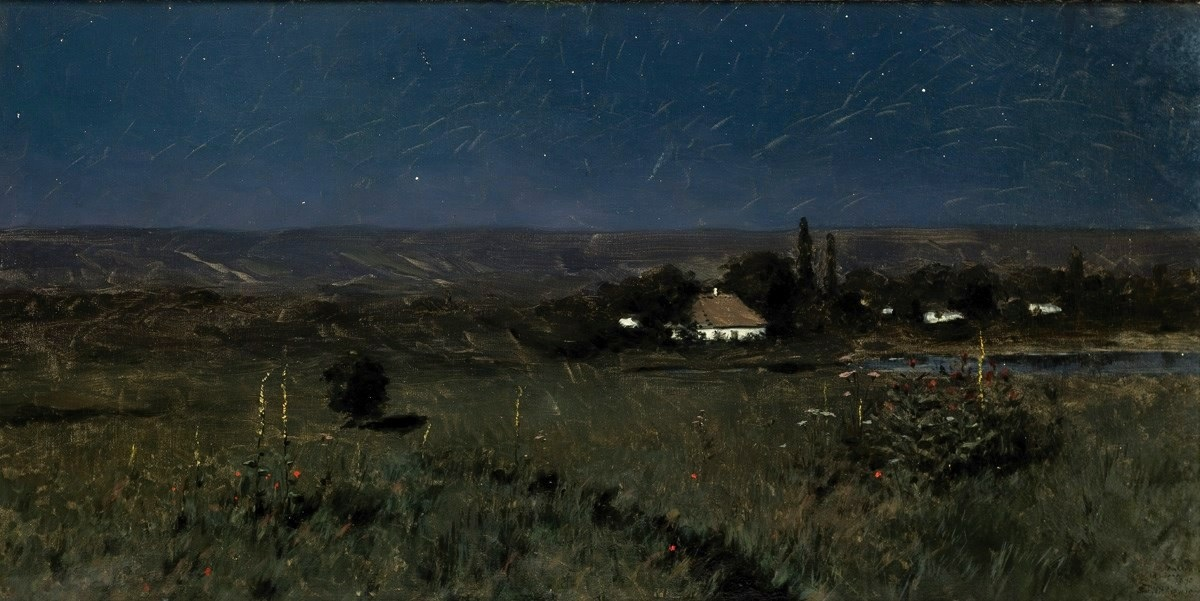
Ukrainian night, National Museum, Kraków

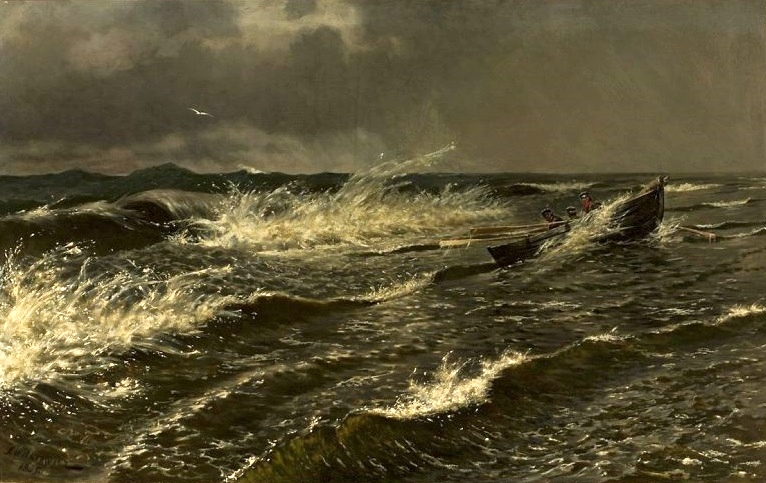
On the Baltic at Palanga, National Museum, Warsaw

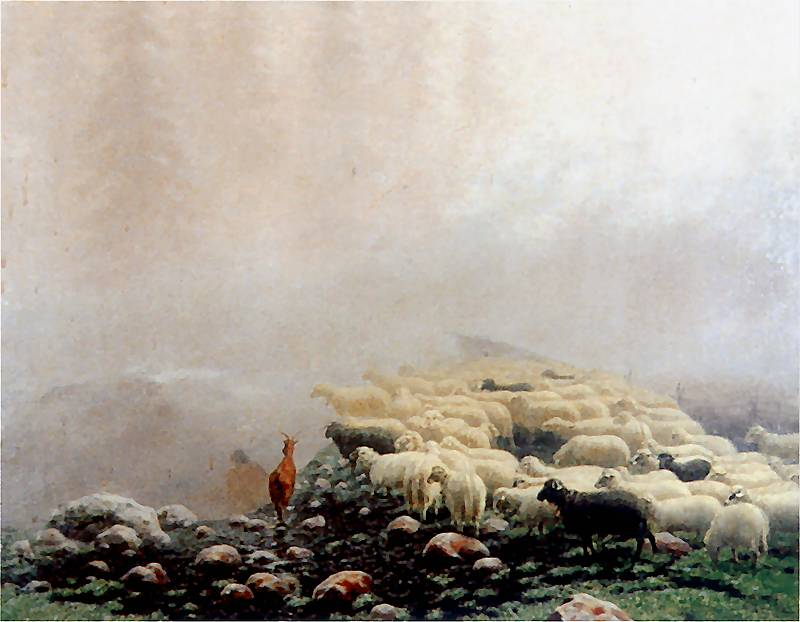
Sheep in the Mist

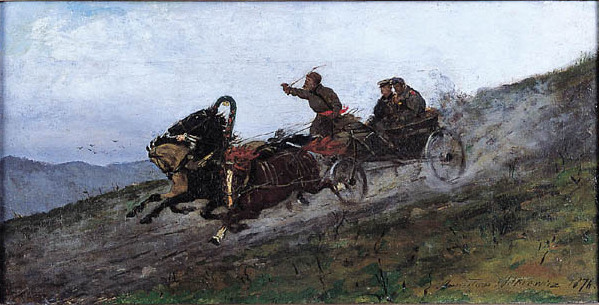
Siberian Troika

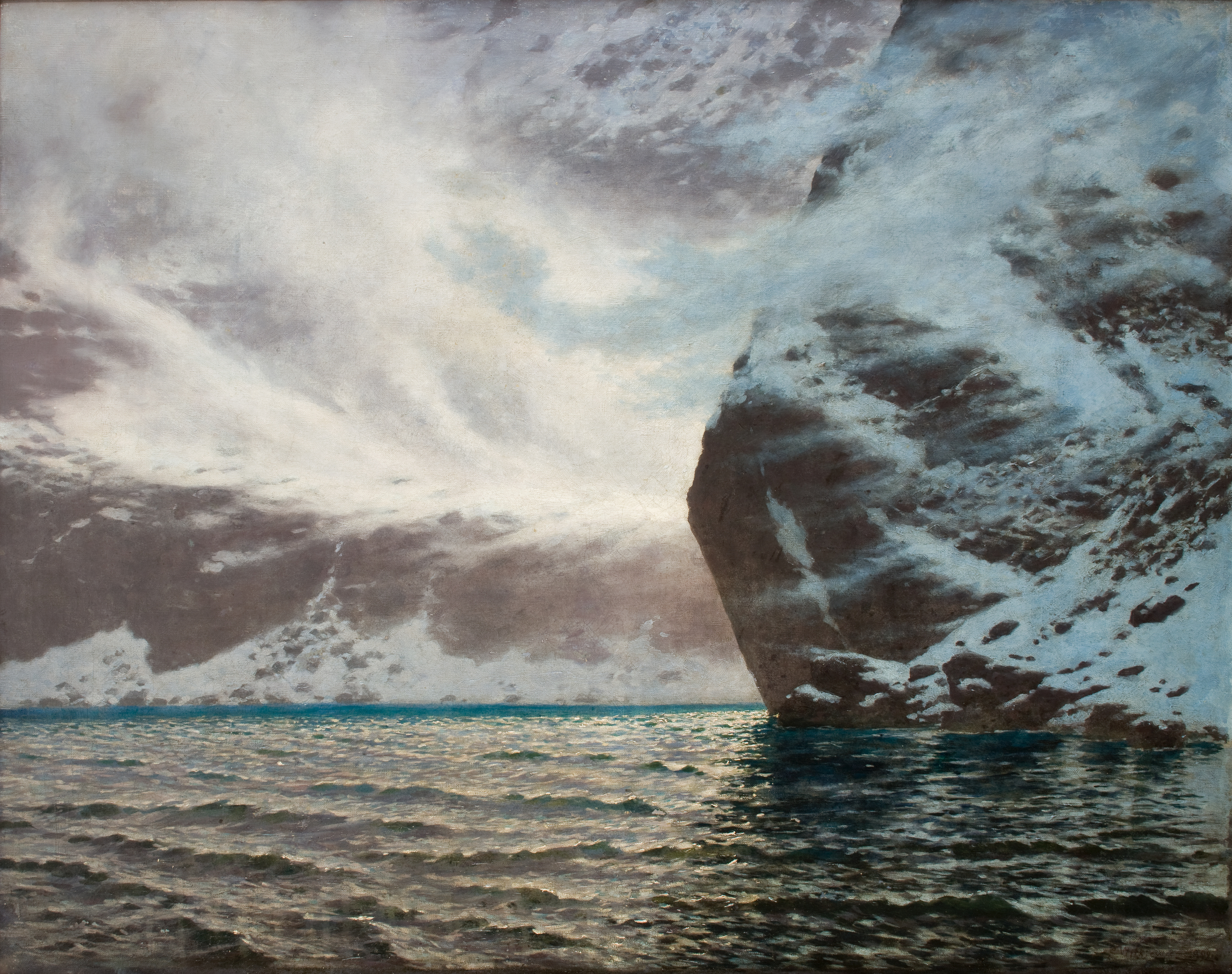
Black Pond

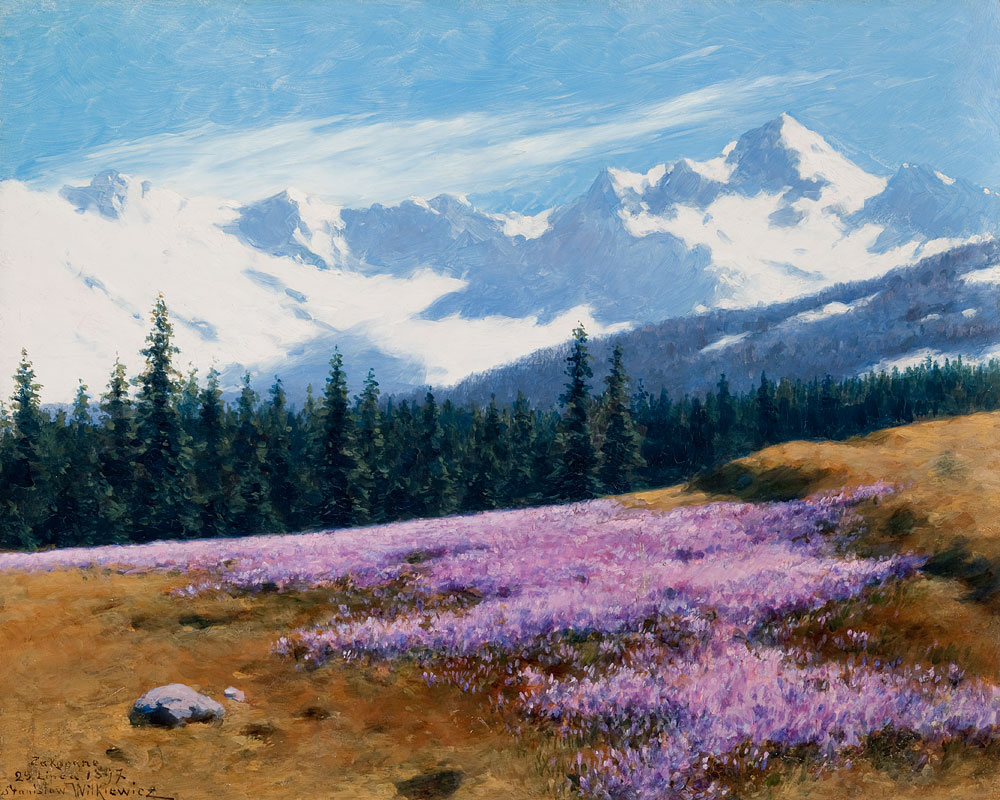
Crocuses with snowy mountains in the background, National Museum, Kraków

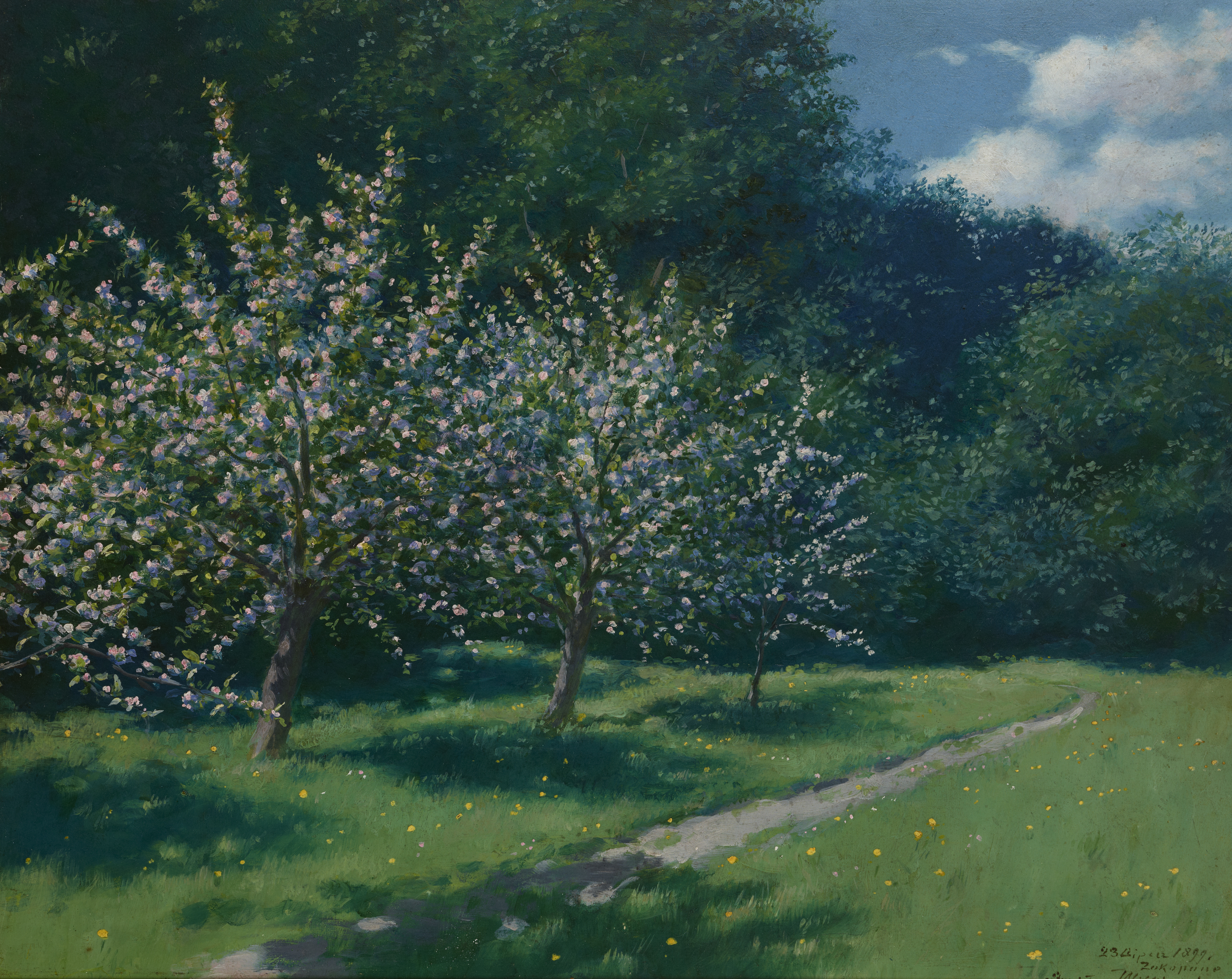
Apple Trees in Bloom, National Museum, Kraków

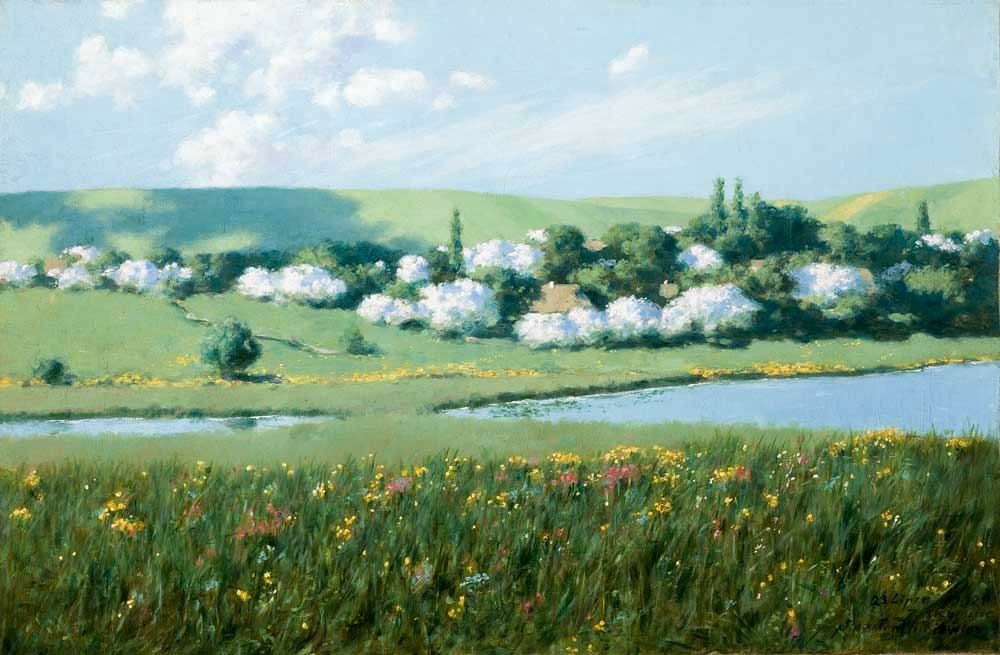
Spring landscape with a pond, National Museum, Kraków

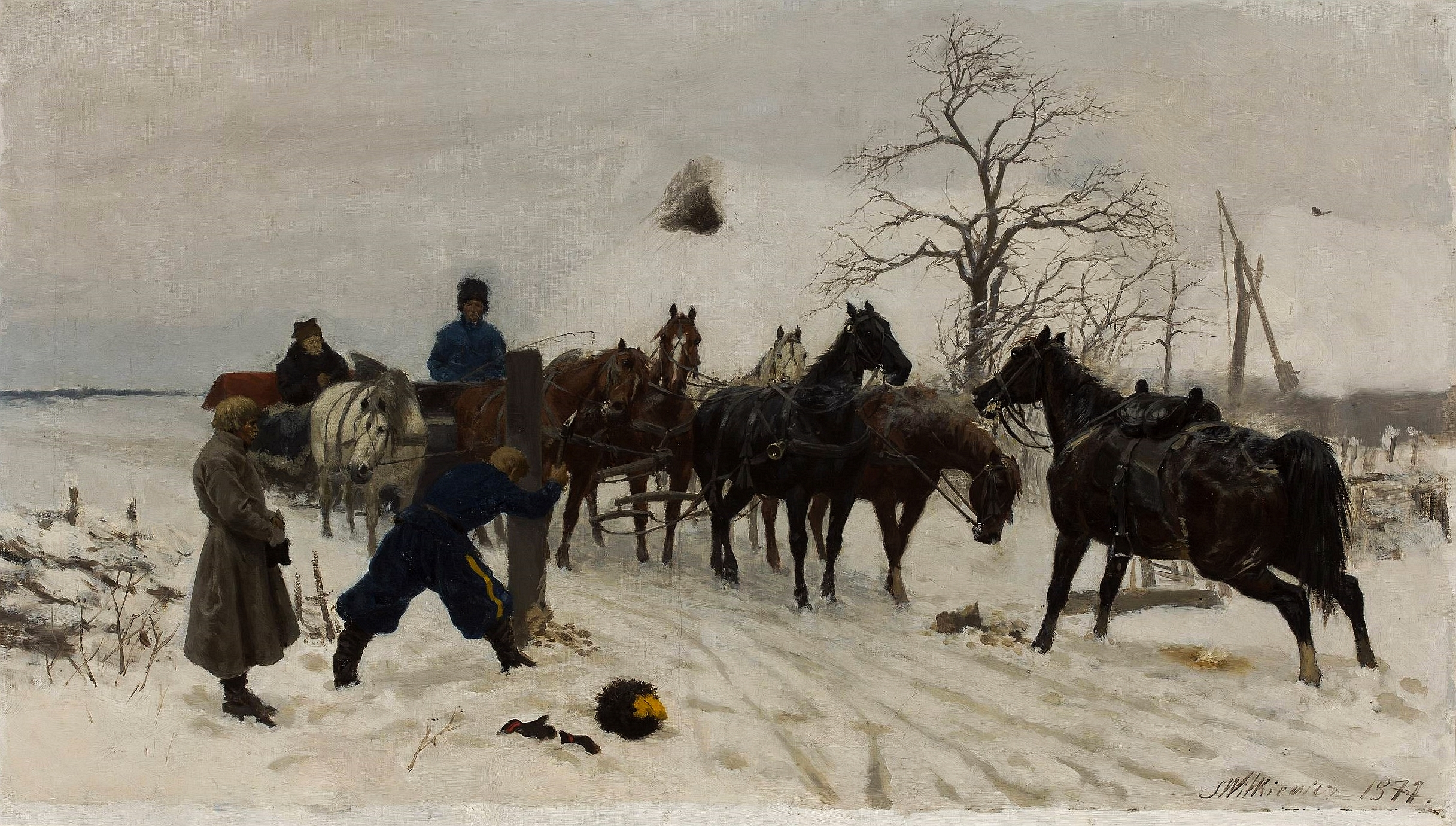
Narrow gate, National Museum, Warsaw

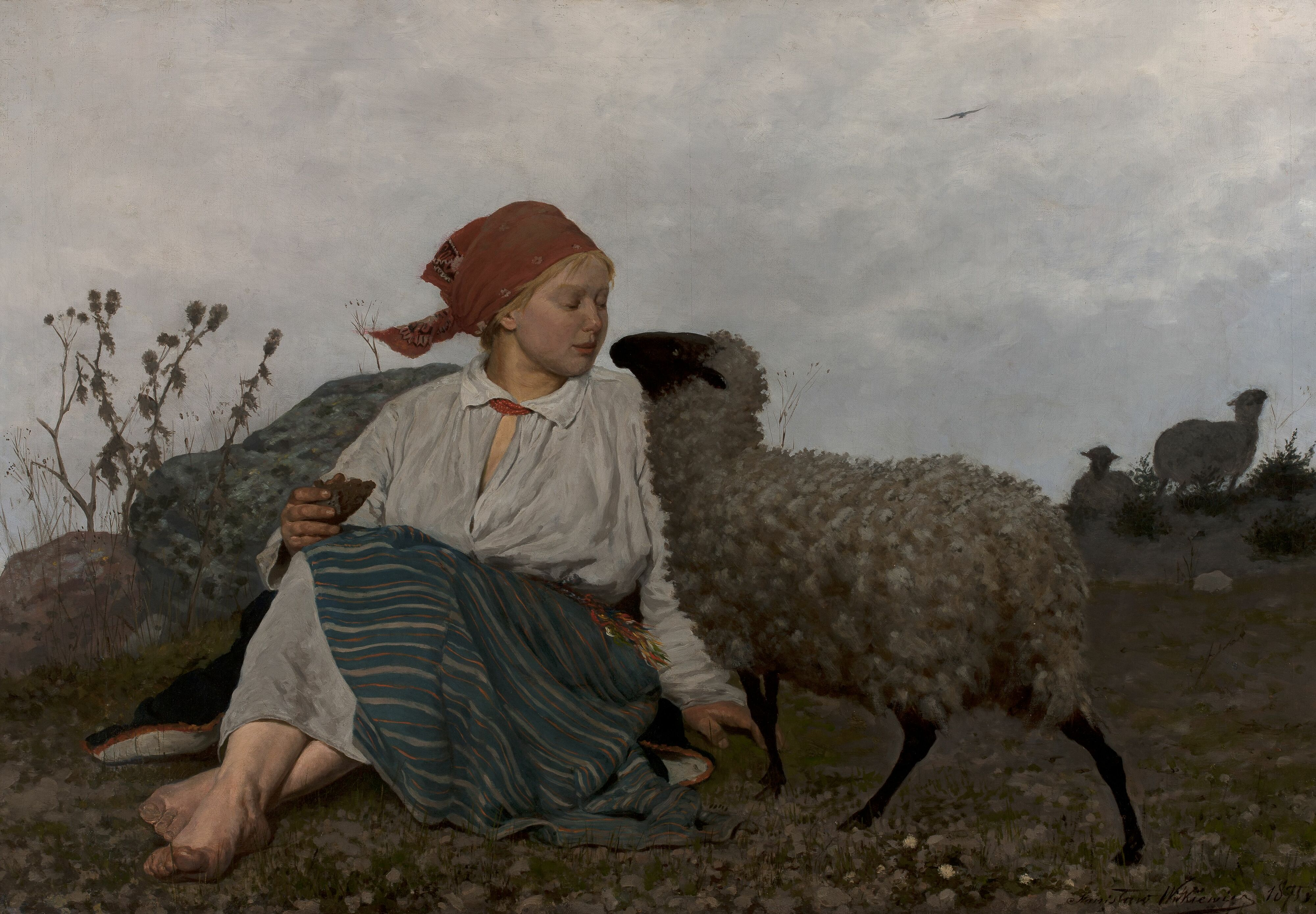
Pasture land, National Museum, Warsaw

== See also ==
- List of Poles
- Bronisław Linke

== Bibliography ==
- Budzyńska, Natalia (2022). Witkiewicz, ojciec Witkacego [Witkiewicz, father of Witkacy] (in Polish). Kraków.
- Piasecki, Zdzisław (1983). Stanisław Witkiewicz. Młodość i wczesny dorobek artysty (in Polish). Warsaw-Wrocław.
- Witkiewicz-Schiele, Elżbieta (2016). Nie tylko Witkiewiczowie (in Polish). Zakopane: Towarzystwo Muzeum Tatrzańskiego im. Dra Tytusa Chałubińskiego w Zakopanem.
