= Jan Czyński =

Polish activist

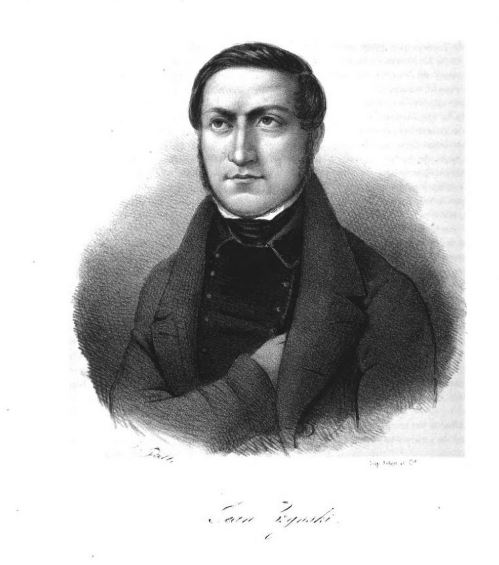
Jan Kazimierz Czyński

Jan Kazimierz Czyński (1801–1867) was a Polish independence activist, lawyer by education, writer and publicist, fighter for the emancipation of the Jews, trade supporter, utopian socialist, and radical democrat. He went into exile after the Russian government issued a bounty for his capture.

Czyński was one of the most vocal supporters of the Uprising and founded the first daily newspaper in Lublin, Kurier Lubelski. In his later life, he moved to Paris, France, where he was an advocate for Polish emigrants. Czyński served on the Polish National Committee. He authored multiple publications and edited several newspapers.

== Biography ==
He was born on 20 January 1801 in Warsaw, Prussian partition of Poland, South Prussia province of the Kingdom of Prussia, in a Polish Jewish family of Frankists (Jews who converted to Roman Catholicism). After finishing his studies at the University of Warsaw, Czyński became a lawyer and activist in Lublin, supporter of Polish Jacobins and member of Patriotic Society (Towarzystwo Patriotyczne). In 1830, he participated in the November Uprising (1830–1831) as an adjutant to the local Polish commander, Col. Wincenty Szeptycki. He became known as one of the most vocal supporters of the Uprising and the founder of the first daily newspaper in Lublin, "Kurier Lubelski". After the Uprising was defeated, the Russian government issued a bounty (1,000 chervonets) for his capture; Czyński went into exile, escaping to Prussia and eventually joining the Great Emigration in France.

In Paris, France, he became one of the important activist of the Polish emigrants, where he successfully merged the Polish independence and pan-European thought (particularly Fourierist utopian socialism). Early coworker of Joachim Lelewel. Member of Polish National Committee. Co-organizer of Polish Democratic Society (Towarzystwo Demokratyczne Polskie). Disagreed with Prince Adam Jerzy Czartoryski, as well as with the messianism of Adam Mickiewicz. Supporter of emancipation of the Jews and eventually of the Polish positivists, with whom he agreed that through education of society Polish independence can be secured. Member of French Institute of History and Literary Society. Author of many publications, editor of several newspapers: editor in chief of "Postęp" and "La Pologne", co-editor of "Północ" with Szymon Konarski, contributor to "Archives Izraelites" and "Gazeta Narodowa", publisher of "La Russie Pittoresque", publisher and editor of "Echa Miast Polskich"". After some time he moved from Paris to London, England, where he died on 30 January 1867.

== Selected publications ==
- Question des Juifs Polonais envisagée comme question européenne (The Question of the Polish Jews, considered as a European question), Paris, 1833
- Le Réveil d'Israel, Paris, 1847
- Le Fils de la Juive, Paris, 1848
- Israel en Pologne, Paris, 1861
