= Jan Prosper Witkiewicz =

Lithuanian explorer and diplomat

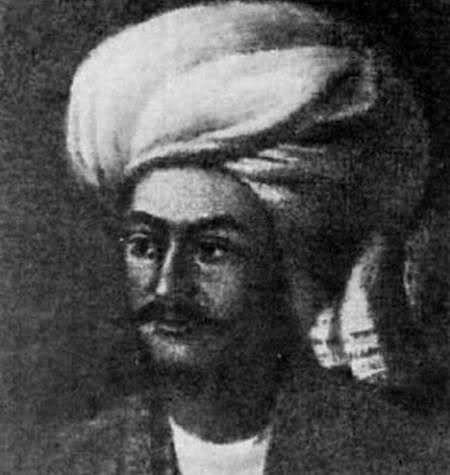
- Born: 24 June 1808; Pašiaušė, Lithuania-Vilnius Governorate, Russian Empire
- Died: 8 May 1839 (aged 30); Saint Petersburg, Russian Empire
- Occupations: Orientalist, explorer and diplomat

Jan Prosper Witkiewicz (Lithuanian: Jonas Prosperas Vitkevičius; Russian: Ян Ви́кторович Витке́вич) (June 24, 1808–May 8, 1839) was a Polish-Lithuanian orientalist, explorer and diplomat serving the Russian Empire. He was a Russian agent in Kabul just before the First Anglo-Afghan War.

Surviving family accounts (supported by Polish literature) suggest that, most probably, he was a double agent who tried to provoke a major conflict between the British and Russian Empire in Central Asia to weaken the latter decisively and thus give his native country a chance to regain sovereignty. Though this is in juxtaposition to all other evidence, and also calls into question the reason for his dedication to success in his Missions. He was also the paternal uncle of Stanisław Witkiewicz.

== Early life ==
He was born into an old and distinguished family of Samogitian nobility in the Lithuanian village of Pašiaušė, at the time under Russian occupation. His father, Wiktoryn Witkiewicz, was the vice-marshal of the Šiauliai County appointed by Napoleon during the French invasion of Russia, and his mother was Justyna Aniela née Mikucka.

== Imprisonment and exile ==
In 1817, Jan began studying at Kražiai College. While still at the college, he had helped found a secret society called the Black Brothers, an underground revolutionary-national resistance movement. Students initiated the movement to fight the Russian occupation and distributed banned books, supported anti-Russian sentiments and wrote independence-oriented manifestos.

However, in 1823, the Black Brothers movement was exposed after they began posting revolutionary slogans and verses on prominent public buildings, and started sending anti-Tsarist letters, poems and patriotic appeals to the principal and students of the Vilnius University. In early 1824, Witkiewicz, together with five other youngsters, was arrested, brought to the prison of the former Basilian Monastery in Vilnius and interrogated. In an attempt to prevent any potential uprisings among other students, three of them were sentenced to death by the Russian authorities, and the remaining three were to be flogged and then exiled to Southern Ural.

In a fortunate course of events and thanks to the involvement of the Konstantin Pavlovich, Grand Duke of Russia, the de facto viceroy of the Congress Poland, the death sentences were changed with life imprisonment with hard labour in the Babruysk fortress. Deprived of his nobility and forbidden all further contact with his family for ten years, Witkiewicz was later taken to serve as a common soldier at the Orsk fortress by the Ural River overlooking the Kazakh steppe.

The poet Adam Mickiewicz retells in his poem Dziady how the Black Brothers from Kražiai were the first among the Polish-Lithuanian youth to be prosecuted in the Russian Empire. In the poem, there is also a scene where Mickiewicz describes how the young adolescents, handcuffed and chained, were bid farewell at the Gate of Dawn in Vilnius.

Małe chłopcy, znędzniałe, wszyscy jak rekruci
Z golonymi głowami; — na nogach okuci.
Biedne chłopcy — najmłodszy, dziesięć lat, niebożę,
Skarżył się, że łańcucha podźwignąć nie może;
I pokazywał nogę skrwawioną i nagą.
Policmejster przejeżdża, pyta, czego żądał;
Policmejster człek ludzki, sam łańcuch oglądał:
«Dziesięć funtów, zgadza się z przepisaną wagą». —
Wywiedli Janczewskiego; — poznałem, oszpetniał,
Sczerniał, schudł, ale jakoś dziwnie wyszlachetniał.
Ten przed rokiem swawolny, ładny chłopczyk mały,
Dziś poglądał z kibitki, jak z odludnej skały
Ów Cesarz! — okiem dumnym, suchym i pogodnym;
To zdawał się pocieszać spólników niewoli,
To lud żegnał uśmiechem, gorzkim, lecz łagodnym,
Jak gdyby im chciał mówić: nie bardzo mię boli.
[…]

On postrzegł, że lud płacze patrząc na łańcuchy,
Wstrząsł nogą łańcuch, na znak, że mu niezbyt ciężył. —
A wtem zacięto konia, — kibitka runęła —
On zdjął z głowy kapelusz, wstał i głos natężył,
I trzykroć krzyknął: «Jeszcze Polska nie zginęła». —
[...]
I zostaną w mej myśli, — i w drodze żywota
Jak kompas pokażą mi, powiodą, gdzie cnota:
Jeśli zapomnę o nich, Ty, Boże na niebie,
Zapomnij o mnie. —

— Adam Mickiewicz, Dziady część III (1832)
Translation:

Poor starving boys, their heads like convicts' shaved,
Neglected, and their feet with chains entraved.
Poor lads ! I heard the youngest one complain
A ten-year-old-he could not bear the ohain,
And showed his naked leg with blood a-spatter.
Up rides the Chief, and asks, What is the matter?
Humane, in person he'll investigate :
"Ten pounds," he says, "the regulation weight."
Then came Janczewski, uglier through trouble,
Darker, thinner, and yet strangely noble.
Last year a small boy frolicsome and fair,
Now like that Emperor, with sombre air,
Yet dry, serene, from Saint Helena's cliff,
So looks he from his gaol-cart, proud and stiff.
Thus did he seem his fellows to beguile
And bid the big folk farewell with bitter smile
Yet gentle. "It hurts not much," he seemed to say.
[...]
He saw them looking at his chains and sobbing
Then rattled them, as if to say: "They're nothing!"
They started up the horse-the kibitka moved
He raised his hat, called loudly to the host
Three glorious times : "Still Poland is not lost! "
[...]
And will be in my thoughts-there they will show
Where virtue is, and whither I should go!
If I forget them, God in Heaven, Thou
Forget me too!

— trans. Count Potocki of Montalk (1968)

== Later life ==
An extremely capable, brave and charismatic man, Witkiewicz was fluent in Polish, English, French, German and Russian. In exile, he learned Persian, Pashto, Kazakh and several Turkic languages. According to Aušrinė Slavinskienė, Witkiewicz knew 19 languages from both Europe and Asia. Reconciled to Russian rule, Witkiewicz entered Russian service. Until the late 19th century, Russian nationalism was not defined in lingual or ethnic terms, but in terms of loyalty to the House of Romanov, so insofar as Witkiewicz was loyal to it, he was considered a "Russian". In 1829, he became an interpreter for Alexander von Humboldt. At Humboldt's suggestion he was promoted to sergeant. In 1832 he was promoted to ensign and was on the Orenburg border commission. He was sent deep into the Kazakh Steppe where he engaged in diplomacy and intelligence, collected geographic and ethnographic information and had several run-ins with bandits. General Vasily Perovsky, the Orenburg commander, said that he knew more about the region than any other officer, past or present.

In November 1835, he joined a caravan at Orsk and in January 1836 reached Bukhara where he collected political intelligence and discussed trade and diplomacy with the Emir's officials. The visit's purpose was to find out if the Emir of Bukhara would remain neutral if Russia attacked the Khanate of Khiva, which they did in 1839. At Bukhara, he met Hussein Ali, a man who had been sent by Dost Mohammad Khan of Kabul to visit the tsar. He accompanied Hussein Ali to Orenburg and Saint Petersburg which they reached in July 1836. He served as an interpreter in Afghan-Russian discussions, which went on until May 1837.

In 1837, on instructions of Count Karl Nesselrode, the Russian Foreign Minister, he was sent on a return diplomatic mission to Kabul. Reaching Tehran from Tbilisi, he met the Russian minister in Tehran, Count Ivan Simonich. Continuing east with a Cossack escort, he accidentally encountered Lieutenant Henry Rawlinson. Speaking in Turcoman, he claimed to be carrying gifts from the Tsar Nicholas I to the Shah Mohammad Qajar who at this time was marching east to capture Herat. Rawlinson reached the Shah's camp that night. The Shah told him that the story was nonsense and that he had personally given Witkiewicz permission to cross his territory to Kabul. A bit later, Witkiewicz appeared in camp. Now speaking perfect French, he apologized to Rawlinson for his necessary carefulness in the dangerous country. Rawlinson reported his meeting to McNeill in Tehran on 1 November, and the news soon reached Calcutta and London. Since the British already knew that Simonich, and possibly the Tsar, had encouraged the Persian attack on Herat, their determination to do something about Afghanistan increased.

Witkiewicz reached Kabul on Christmas Eve 1837 and had Christmas dinner with the British representative Sir Alexander Burnes, the American adventurer Josiah Harlan, and the Emir of Afghanistan, Dost Mohammad Khan. Burnes described Witkiewicz:

He was a gentlemanly and agreeable man, of about thirty years of age, spoke French, Turkish and Persian fluently, and wore the uniform of an officer of the Cossacks.

At first, Dost Mohammad favoured the British since they were nearby, but on receiving Lord Auckland's ultimatum he turned to Witkiewicz. In Kabul, Witkiewicz presented himself as a messenger from Emperor Nicholas I. Still, Dost Mohammad noted that the letter that Witkewicz had brought with him purportedly from Nicholas himself had no signature. Witkewicz's letter had as its seal the Russian imperial double-headed eagle, which Burnes made a copy of. Burnes showed his copy to Charles Masson, who recalled:

Captain Burnes pointed out to me the large exterior seal on the envelope. I sent for a loaf of Russian sugar from the bazaar, at the bottom of which we found precisely the same seal.

Meanwhile, in London, Palmerston called in the Russian ambassador Count Carlo Andrea Pozzo di Borgo and complained about Russian activities in Afghanistan. Seeing that the British were in an aggressive mood, the Russians recalled both Simonich and Witkiewicz while making some pretence that both had exceeded their instructions. For the rest, see First Anglo-Afghan War.

Witkiewicz reached Saint Petersburg on 1 May 1839. What went on between him and Minister Nesselrode is disputed:

According to one account, Nesselrode refused to see him, saying he

knew of no Captain Vikevitch, except an adventurer of that name who, it was reported, had been lately engaged in some unauthorised intrigues in Caubul [Kabul].

A week after reaching St. Petersburg, he was found shot dead in his hotel room. A pistol was by his side and a pile of burnt papers was in the room. Witkiewicz had committed suicide as Nesselrode had disallowed him, claiming his visit to Kabul was not on his orders. With his dream of a diplomatic career in ruins, Witkiewicz had decided to take his own life.

Imperial Russian accounts disagree, stating that he was honoured and was even granted an audience with the Tsar the next day. They hint at a British-backed assassination to prevent Witkeiwicz from sharing the valuable intelligence that he had collected on Afghanistan and that the assassins probably burned his papers.

There is also an explanation that he committed suicide after a visit from an old Polish friend the same day, in which he was severely criticized for having been a traitor to the ideals of his youth (independence from Russia) and for his service in the ranks of his country's Russian enemy.

== Family ==
Witkiewicz was the uncle of the renowned Polish painter, architect, writer and art theoretician Stanisław Witkiewicz, who in turn was the father of Stanisław Ignacy Witkiewicz.

== Cultural references ==
Jan Witkiewicz and his life inspired Russian writers; Yulian Semyonov based his book The Diplomatic Agent (Diplomaticheskiy agent; 1958) on Witkiewicz's life story. Incidentally, this work is regarded as the first noticeable book by Semyonov. Mikhail Gus made Witkiewicz the main character of his book Duel' w Kabulie (A Duel in Kabul). Witkiewicz is the main character of Valentin Pikul's historical miniature Opasnaja doroga w Kabul (A dangerous Way to Kabul). He is also mentioned in Tadeusz Miciński's Nietota, one of the earliest examples of literary concepts giving gradual rise to magical realism.

Witkiewicz is the prototype of the main hero in the feature film Sluzhba otiechestvu (Service to the Homeland; 1981) by Uzbek film director Latif Fayziyev). The adventures of Russian officer Aleksey Nalymov are inspired by Witkiewicz's fate.

Jan Witkiewicz inspired the Lithuanian author Regimantas Dima to write his book Vilniaus Plovas (Vilniaus Pilaf, 2015).
