= Szymon Konarski =

Polish-Lithuanian politician

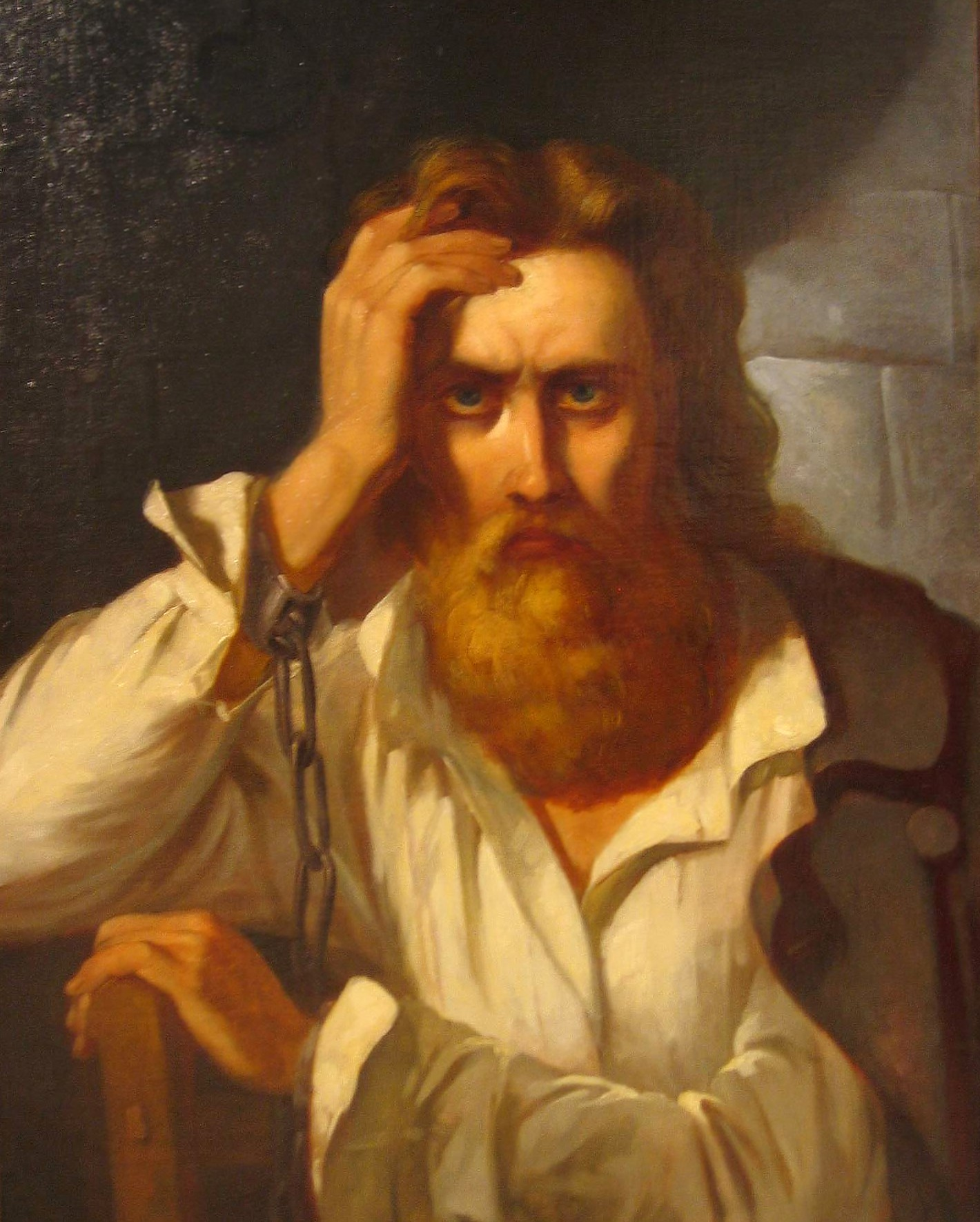
Szymon Konarski

Szymon Konarski (Lithuanian: Simonas Konarskis; 1808–1839) was a 19th-century Polish-Lithuanian radical democratic politician and revolutionary, one of the leaders of the November Uprising of 1831. As a politician, he supported the radical idea of social and economic equality for all men, as well as the right of political and national liberty and self-governance. Konarski supported the idea of land reform in the form of parceling out aristocratic estates among the poor peasants, and opposed the clergy.

== Life ==
Szymon Konarski was born on 5 March 1808 in the village of Dapkiškės (Dobkiszki), Duchy of Warsaw, to a Calvinist landowning family. The Konarskis originated from Konary in southern Poland and traced their lineage to the House of Griffin. His grandfather, Jerzy, was an officer in the Polish Crown Army and a justice of the peace in Kalwaria Zebrzydowska. His father, Jerzy Stanisław, was a justice of the peace, the owner of Dobkiszki and Buchnicki starosta. He served as a colonel in the Polish Army and was a veteran of the War in Defense of the Constitution and the Kościuszko Uprising. He died when Szymon was a child. Konarski's mother, Paulina née Wiszniewska was also active in the struggle for independence for the former Polish–Lithuanian Commonwealth and took part in the Lithuanian Highest National Council (RNNL). At the age of 9 Szymon joined a local Calvinist school in Sejny and then a trade school in Łomża.

Upon graduating, on 22 March 1826 he joined the army of the Kingdom of Poland. Serving in the foot rifle regiment, Konarski quickly advanced through its ranks and the following year he rose from the rank of Private to NCO. During the November Uprising against Imperial Russia Konarski's regiment took part in some of the fiercest battles of the war, including those of Okuniew, Wawer, Grochów and Liw. Promoted to the rank of podporucznik (2nd Lieutenant), Konarski also took part in Gen. Dezydery Chłapowski's raid into Lithuania, which resulted in his internment in East Prussia.

Released, in March 1832 Konarski arrived in Besançon, France, where he took up clock making as a trade. At the same time he studied the French republican thought and came in touch with the works of some of the classics of the French Revolution. Fascinated with radical democracy and republicanism, Konarski also joined a masonic lodge and became active among the Great Emigration movement, notably in the circle of Joachim Lelewel. He became involved in the preparations for the ousting of Louis-Philippe of France, proposed by radical republicans. The plan was for the revolution to then spread to other countries, including Germany, Italy and Poland. The concept was soon accepted by the Polish emigrants who started preparations for Józef Zaliwski's raid into Poland and another national uprising. Thus Konarski became the representative of the revolutionaries for the areas of Kalvarija and Marijampolė.

Konarski, pursued by the Russians, reached Poland clandestinely in early 1833 and commenced preparations. However, the society was tired of constant warfare, the last uprising having ended only two years before. Konarski's activities met with little support and he was forced to yet again flee to Prussia. Arrested by the Prussians, he was allowed to pass on to Belgium. He spent some time in Brussels, but in late 1833 he was appointed to Bienn in Switzerland. There he came into contact with yet another radical wing of Polish emigration, allied with the Young Italy movement. Konarski then joined a Polish military unit which was to start a fight alongside the Italians against King Charles Albert of Sardinia. However, soon after the start of the campaign, the corps of Gen. Antonio Girolamo Ramorino was utterly defeated.

Not discouraged by the defeat, Konarski allied himself with Young Poland, a Polish faction of Young Europe movement. Conflicted with Prince Adam Jerzy Czartoryski, he was alienated within generally less radical Polish emigrants. He openly criticized the aristocratic faction and became involved in the creation of Union of Children of the Polish People, under heavy influence of the Pavel Pestel's Russian Decembrists. In 1835, together with several radical democrats, among them Jan Czyński, Leon Zaleski and Adam Sperczyński, Konarski started to publish a democratic bi-weekly "Północ". They were to yet again move to Poland and start preparations for a revolution, but were arrested by the French police and deported to the United Kingdom, possibly due to Czartoryski's intrigue. Konarski then moved back to Brussels, where he came in touch with Joachim Lelewel. On the latter's instructions, in July 1835 Konarski reached the Free City of Kraków under yet another false name, Burhardt Sievers.

There he joined the Association of the Polish People, yet another revolutionary union of all sorts of Polish radicals. Konarski became one of its representatives of the Russian partition of Poland and was to promote revolutionary ideas. He crossed the border under a false name of Janusz Hejbowicz and settled in Ołyka in Volhynia (modern Olyka). Instead of direct agitation, Konarski began to unite all of the secret societies and political parties in Russian-held parts of Poland into the Union of the Polish People. The organization quickly grew and included Polish secret societies in other parts of Russia as well, most notably the students of the university of St. Petersburg. However, the organization, with its French supporters, were infiltrated by the French and Russian secret police (Ochrana).

=== Arrest and death ===
Louis-Philippe's secret agents passed the information of Konarski's true identity to the Russians and he was arrested on 27 May 1838 near Vilna (modern Vilnius). Imprisoned in the former Basilian monastery, Konarski could do little but to watch most of his comrades arrested in the following months, as Prince Alexey Trubetskoy was able to force some of Konarski's men to inform on the other members of the Union. Tried for high treason, Konarski tried to blame all on himself and portrayed his comrades as either manipulated or insane. He came into contact with one of the guards, a former Decembrist Lt. Aglay Kuzmin-Karavayev (Russian: Аглай Константинович Кузьмин-Караваев), who planned Konarski's escape, however Kuzmin-Karavayev was himself arrested (together with other some 30 helpers and sympathizers) after the betrayal of the escape. Finally Konarski was sentenced to death by firing squad and was executed in Vilna on 27 February 1839. His grave was then trampled with horses and was never found.

On the night before his execution he wrote: "I do not want Heaven, I spit into Heaven, so long as my countrymen are enslaved!" [...] "O Lord, save Poland, O Lord, redeem Poland!".

== See also ==
- Józef Mianowski
- Ludwik Trynkowski

== Bibliography ==
- Alina Barszczewska-Krupa (1976). Szymon Konarski. Warsaw: Wiedza Powszechna. p. 270.
- Henryk Mościcki (1949). Szymon Konarski.
