= Ludwik Trynkowski =

Ludwik Trynkowski (born 1805, d. 1849 in Irkutsk) was a Polish Roman Catholic priest and religious writer.

He studied at Vilnius University. He was accused of connections with Szymon Konarski, detained by the czarist authorities and deported to Siberia. He died, suffering from mental illness.

He was the author of articles about philosophy (Widnokrąg naukowy. Rzut oka na filozoficzność współczesną, "Piśmiennictwo Krajowe", 1841, nr 15-16; Wpływ filozofii współczesnej na literaturę w ogólności, "Przegląd Naukowy", 1842, nr 3). Trynkowski postulated a creation of Polish Christian philosophy.
