= Leon Zaleski =

Polish activist

Leon Zaleski (c. 1810 in Poland–February 1841 in Lwów) was a Polish patriotic activist. Zaleski was a member of the Towarzystwo Demokratyczne Polskie, co-organiser of Józef Zaliwski guerrilla warfare (1833), co-founder of the Stowarzyszenie Ludu Polskiego (1835) and member of its Zbór Główny, co-founder of the Konfederacja Powszechna Narodu Polskiego (1837).
