= Bronisław Linke =

Polish painter (1906–1962)

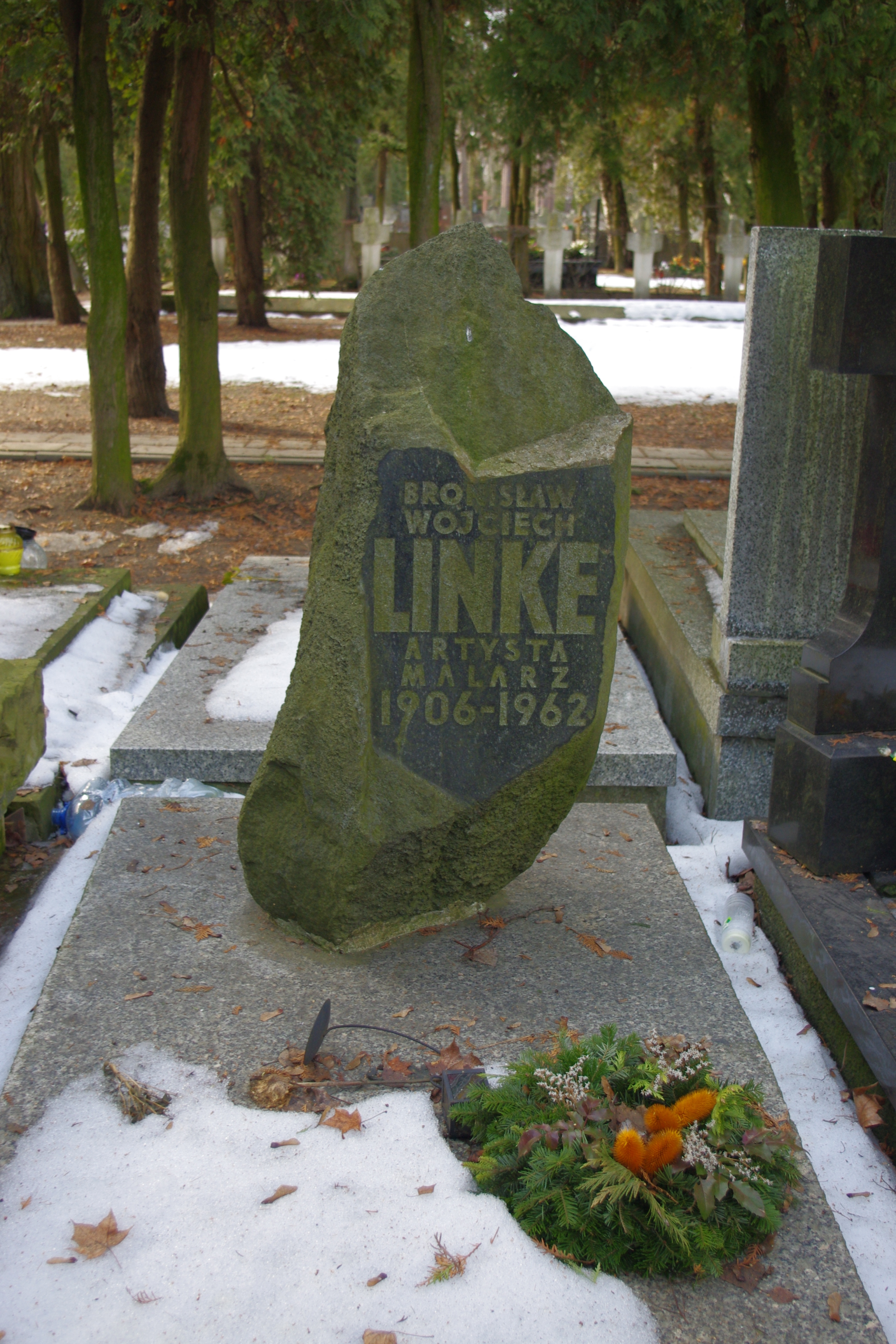
- Linke's grave in Warsaw
- Born: Bronisław Wojciech Linke; 23 April 1906; Tartu, Estonia
- Died: 6 October 1962 (aged 56); Warsaw, Poland
- Education: Warsaw Academy of Art
- Known for: Painting, graphic art, cartoons
- Notable work: The Bus
- Movement: Powiśle

Bronisław Wojciech Linke (23 April 1906, Tartu, Estonia – 6 October 1962, Warsaw, Poland) was a Polish painter and graphic artist noted for his metaphorical realism in his depiction of human destructiveness.

== Early life ==
He was born into the Polish community in Estonia, the son of a notary, Juliusz Ferdynand Linke and Maria, née Starorypińska. In 1919 the family were 'repatriated' to Poland and settled in Kalisz, a town destroyed in 1914.

He began his art studies in the Bydgoszcz School of Industrial Art 1922–1923. He spent the next two years in the Kraków Art School, followed by five years at the Warsaw Academy of Art 'ASP', under the direction of Tadeusz Pruszkowski. He joined the 'Wolnomalarska Lodge' (a painterly pun in Polish on freemasonry) and was a member of the „Powiśle” group before and after the Second World War.

== Career ==
His début as a graphic artist was in the columns of the satirical review, Szpilki in 1936. He contributed illustrations to such publications as Dziennik Ludowy, Nowe Życie, Sygnały, Tygodnik Robotnika, and after the war to Polityka and Trybuna Ludu.

As an artist, he worked in thematic periods. His earliest such period of drawings took the title, War (1931–1932), followed by a series called Miasto, 'the City' (1931–1935).

He was a friend of Stanisław Witkiewicz with whom he made a trip to Silesia. The result was a series of 30 drawings under the heading of Śląsk. In May 1938 an exhibition of these latest works in the Instytut Propagandy Sztuki (Institute for the Propagation of Art) was shut down on account of its potentially 'pernicious social effects'.

After the outbreak of World War II, he was forced to flee with his wife and they went to Lwów, for fear of Nazi reprisals for his cartoons of Adolf Hitler that had appeared in the press. In 1942 he was exiled to Orsk in the Ural Federal District. Only in 1946 was he able to return to Poland from there.

On his return to Warsaw he painted his most celebrated Screaming Stones series (1946–56). It was a terrifying vision of the capital in ruins. The work was eponymously published in 1959 with an introduction by Maria Dąbrowska. After the war he exhibited rarely as his work did not cohere with the then prevailing political climate. He was widowed and remarried before the war. There were no children. Linke died of cancer and is buried in Powązki Military Cemetery in Warsaw.

== His work assessed ==
Linke's creativity is often characterized as metaphorical realism. His art is based on visualisations, as it were depictions of literary metaphor. Both the composition of individual works and the structure of his series rest on an evident narrative approach. Most of his work is on paper with the use of Water colour, Gouache, Crayon, pencil or Indian ink. He often scraped the surface of the paper and applied Collage. One of his most famous and late works is the Bus, a palpable reference to Stanisław Wyspiański's play, Wesele, The Wedding. As in the drama, so the figures on the Bus can be seen as slaves who stand in the way of their own liberation. A song, Czerwony autobus was inspired by the painting. In 1981 the poet Jacek Kaczmarski was further inspired by the same painting to write a poem Kanapka z człowiekiem. Another noted Linke work is "Modlitwa zamordowanych”, Prayer of the Murdered from 1942.

In 1991 Grzegorz Dubowski directed a documentary film entitled, Bronisława Linkego opisywanie świata, 'The World as described by Bronisław Linke'.

== See also ==
- Hieronymus Bosch
- List of Poles
