= Józef Mianowski =

Polish researcher and academic

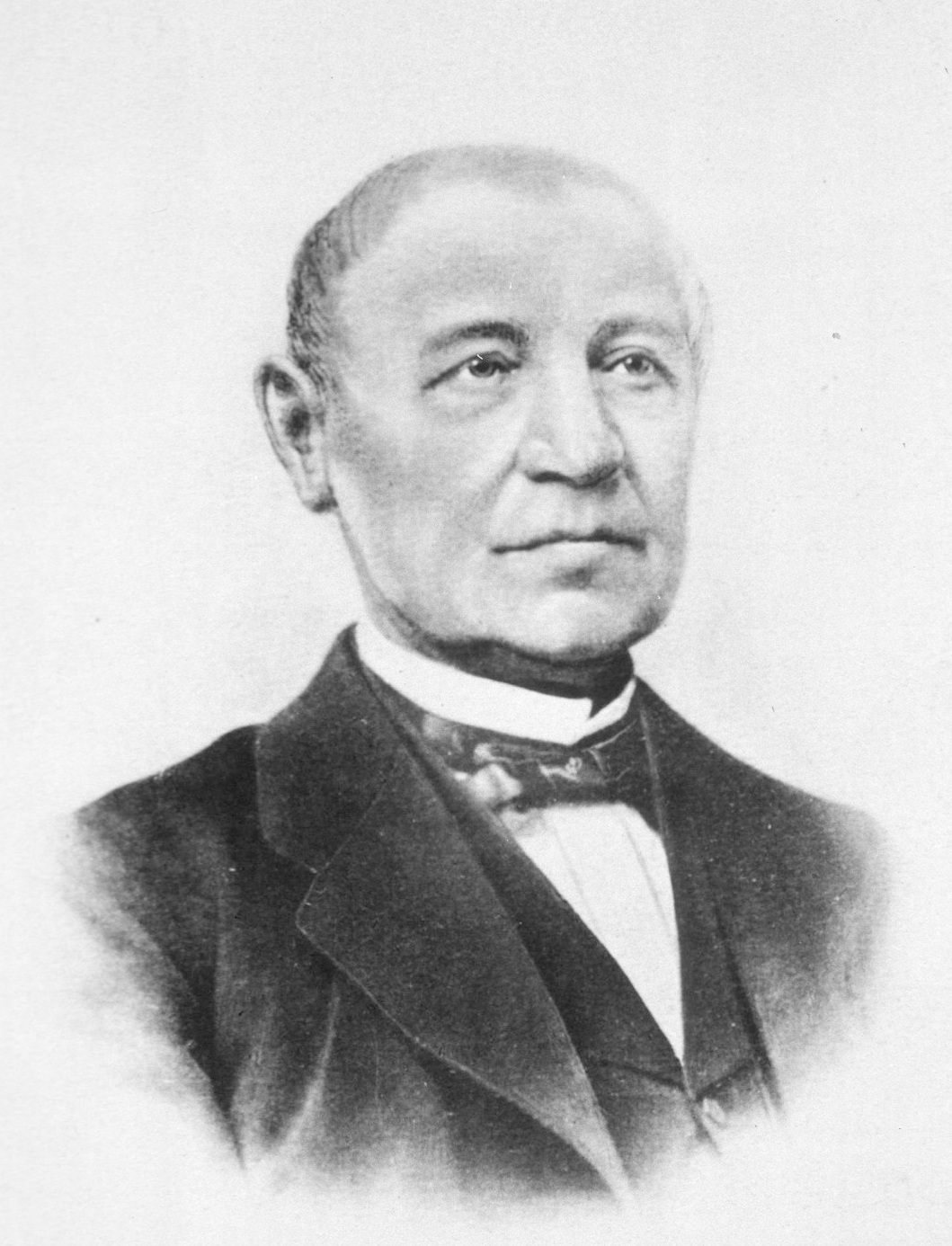
Józef Mianowski

Józef Mianowski (1804–1879) was a Polish medical researcher and practitioner, academic, social and political activist, and rector of the "Main School" incarnation (1862–69) of Warsaw University.

In honor of Mianowski, after his death, in 1881, a foundation was inaugurated to support scientific and scholarly research, named Kasa imienia Józefa Mianowskiego — "the Józef Mianowski Fund" or, more simply, "the Mianowski Fund."

== Life ==
In his youth, Mianowski graduated from Wilno University. He served as a clinical assistant to Jędrzej Śniadecki, was a friend of Polish Romantic poet Juliusz Słowacki, and in 1831 married (his wife died only a year later, in childbirth).

A rising star in medicine, in 1838 Mianowski became an assistant professor at the Wilno Medical-Surgical Academy (a school detached from Wilno University, which had been closed in the aftermath of the November 1830 Uprising. A lecturer in animal and human physiology and general therapeutics in 1839–42, he thrice received a prestigious "diamond ring" from the Russian Tsar.

In 1840, as physician to Polish independence activist Szymon Konarski, Mianowski was arrested and harshly interrogated, but half a year later he was declared innocent and rehabilitated. He accepted a position at the Saint Petersburg Medical-Surgical Academy, where he oversaw the gynecology and pediatrics wards. He worked at the Academy from 1842 to 1860. In 1848 he was appointed personal physician to the Tsar's daughter, Grand Duchess Maria Nikolaievna, Duchess of Leuchtenberg. He was also chief physician at the Second Hospital of Land Forces. In 1860 he retired, but remained physician to the Grand Duchess and had extensive contacts at the Russian Imperial court.

In 1862 Mianowski became rector of the Warsaw Main School (Szkoła Główna Warszawska), then the only institution of higher learning in Russian Poland (all others having been closed after the November 1830 Uprising). The Main School was a reincarnation of the closed University of Warsaw. Mianowski gained popularity among students and faculty for his liberal views; his inaugural speech stressed the links between Polish and western cultures.

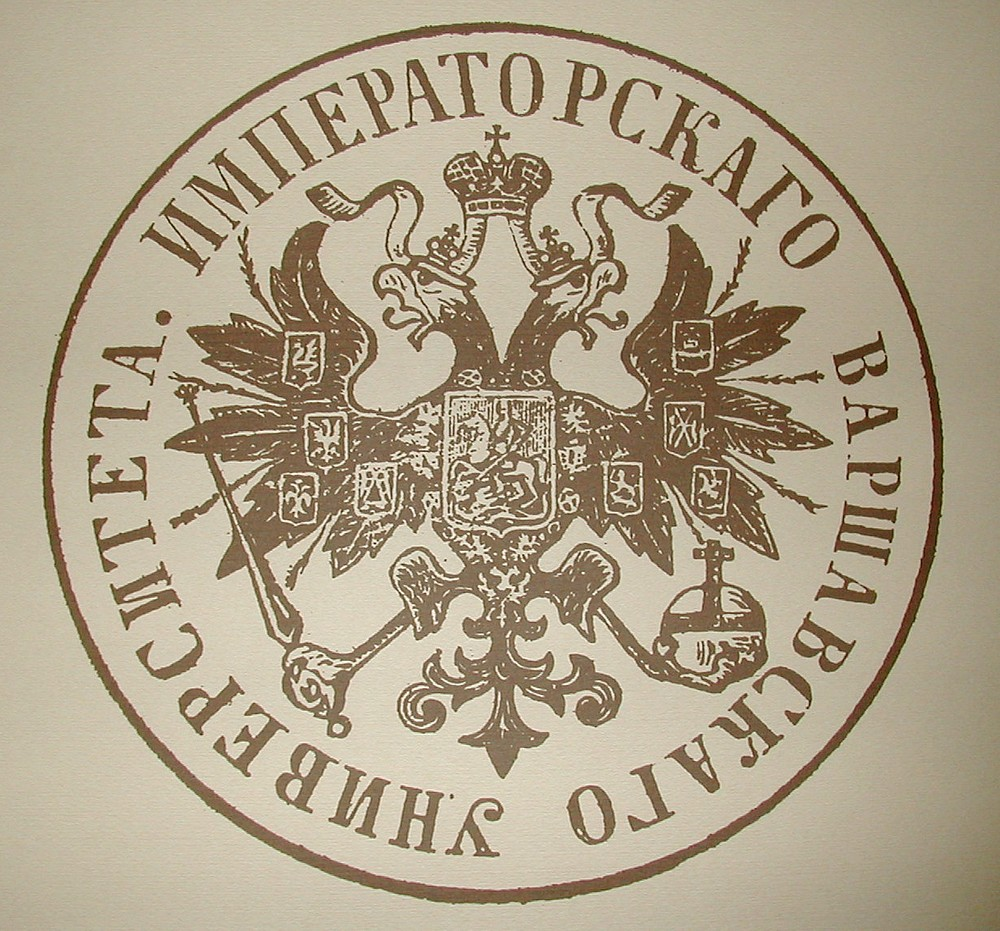
Seal of the Imperial University of Warsaw

During the January 1863 Uprising, Mianowski lent clandestine support to the insurgents. In later stages of the uprising, he participated in the falsification of academic records to provide alibis of attendance to many students who took part in the uprising. He also supported enrollment of others for purposes of alibi. Thanks to his connections at the Saint Petersburg court, these efforts succeeded, and the Main School became a refuge for many insurgents.

In 1868 Mianowski won another victory, albeit a Pyrrhic one: the Main School was enlarged and regained the name "Warsaw University" — however, it was russified (its full name was now "Imperial University of Warsaw" — Императорский Варшавский Университет).

Mianowski, disappointed with this turn of events, emigrated to Italy, where he lived out the remainder of his life.

== Mianowski Fund ==
In 1881, alumni of the Main School established a foundation, named after Józef Mianowski, to support scholarly activity in the sciences and humanities. The foundation was known as Kasa imienia Józefa Mianowskiego ("the Józef Mianowski Fund" or, more simply, "the Mianowski Fund").

This institution became, in the late 19th century, the major Polish organization that sponsored research and publication of scholarly works, and (renamed the "Institute for the Promotion of Science") it continued its activities after Poland regained independence in 1918.

Liquidated in the post World War 2 People's Republic of Poland, the Mianowski Fund was re-established after the fall of communism in 1991.

== See also ==
- Staszic Palace
