= Pašiaušė =

- Village
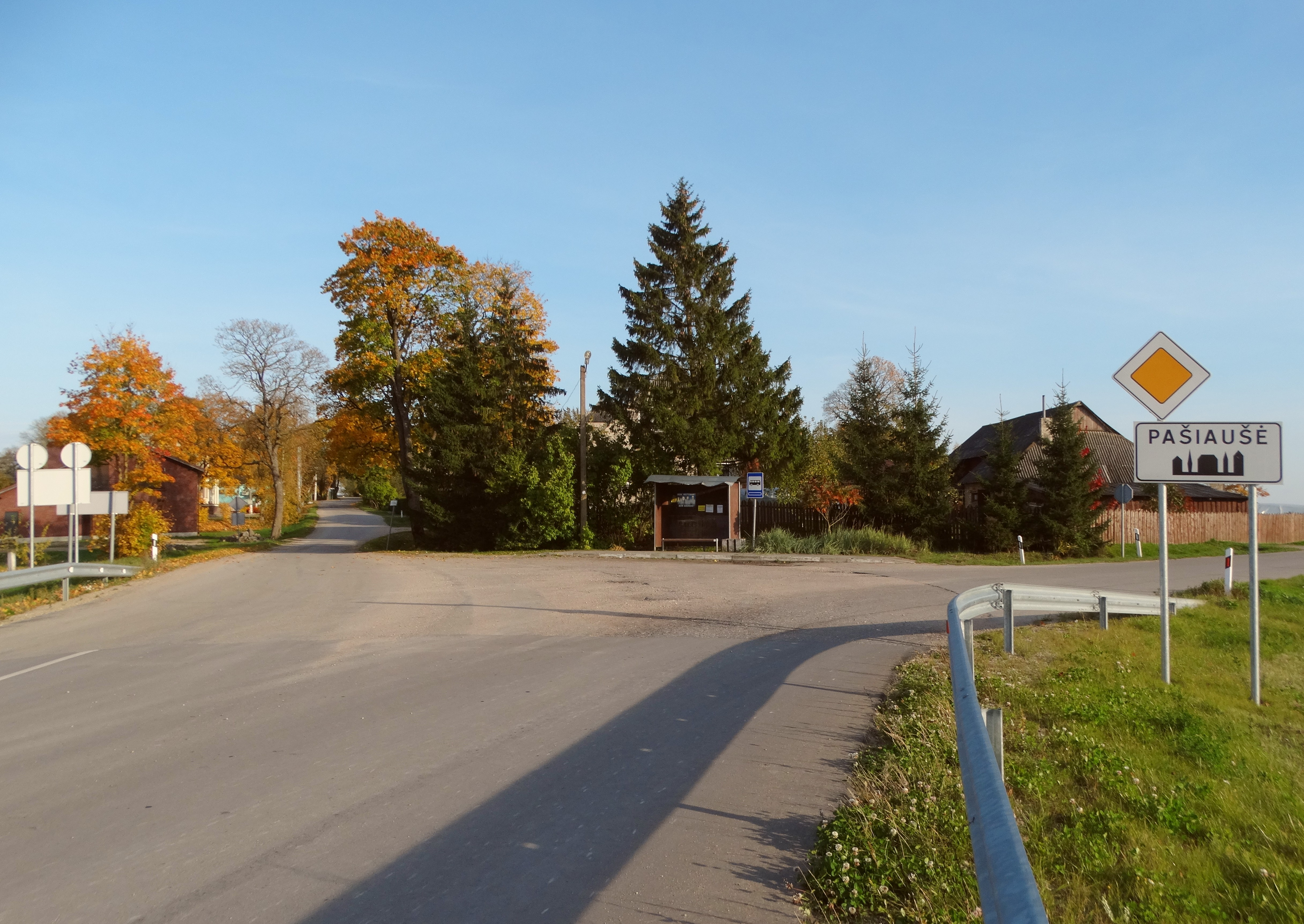

- Location of Pašiaušė
- Coordinates: 55°31′N 23°29′E
- Country: Lithuania
- County: Šiauliai County
- Municipality: Kelmė district municipality
- Eldership: Tytuvėnai eldership

Population (2011)
  - Total: 191
- Time zone: UTC+2 (EET)
  - Summer (DST): UTC+3 (EEST)

Pašiaušė is a village in Lithuania, between Šiauliai and Tytuvėnai. According to census of 2001, it had 191 residents.

== Notable people ==
- Jan Prosper Witkiewicz - a 19th-century Polish–Lithuanian orientalist, explorer and diplomat in Russian service in Central Asia.
