= Association of the Polish People =

Association of the Polish People (Polish: Stowarzyszenie Ludu Polskiego) was a clandestine association founded in 1835 with the aim of establishing an independent Polish republic. The group's revolutionary nature involved various Polish radicals as members and partners, some of whom were actively operating until 1848.

The group was supported by Polish Democratic Society in France.

Notable members include Szymon Konarski (1808–1839) who was involved in the group's founding. The group established cells in Kraków and Lviv In 1841, a faction was established in the region that is present-day Moldova. The leader of the Warsaw cell was Aleksander Wężyk. The group was linked to the Southern Legion of the Republic of Poland which had, at its peak, around 600 soldiers. The military unit survived until 1848 and some of its soldiers crossed the border to join the Hungarian Revolution of 1848.
