= Polish Democratic Society =

Polish émigré society

Polish Democratic Society Towarzystwo Demokratyczne Polskie
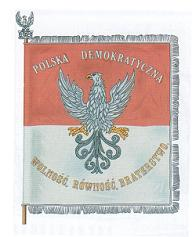
- Banner of the TDP
- Abbreviation: TDP
- Leader: Joachim Lelewel; Jan Nepomucen Janowski; Wiktor Heltman
- Founded: March 17, 1832
- Dissolved: 1862
- Preceded by: Polish National Committee
- Succeeded by: Polish Socialist Party
- Headquarters: Paris, July Monarchy
- Ideology: Utopian socialism Pro-independence; Pro-democracy; Classical radicalism Emancipation of peasants without compensation to landowners
- Political position: Centre-left to Left-wing

The Polish Democratic Society (Polish: Towarzystwo Demokratyczne Polskie or TDP) was a radical constitutionalist political organization established in Paris by émigrés from the Kingdom of Poland in 1832. While not explicitly socialist with respect to their political program, the Democratic Society nonetheless was influenced by French Utopian socialist thinking of the era and advocated the right of citizens to own land or other means of production.

The Polish Democratic Society continued in existence into the decade of the 1840s, when it was a leading voice for revolution in Galicia. It is recognized as a forerunner of the Polish socialist movement which culminated in the establishment of the Polish Socialist Party.

== Organizational history ==
=== Establishment ===
The Polish Democratic Society (TDP) was established in the Kingdom of Poland in March 1832. The first program of the TDP, a so-called "Small Manifesto," was adopted on March 17, 1832, in Paris by a pair of the group's founders, Tadeusz Krępowiecki and Aleksandr Puławski. These individuals traced their organizational roots to earlier activity in the Polish National Committee established in 1831.

=== Program ===
The TDP argued for the need of drastic reforms in reconstituted Poland and published an official newspaper, Demokrata Polski (The Polish Democrat). The group gained support for its cause through its official slogan, "Everything by the People and for the People."

In 1846, some members of the Polish Democratic Society participated in the Kraków uprising. Other notable activists included Stanisław Worcell and Ludwik Mierosławski.

=== Termination ===
The TDP was eventually disbanded in 1862.

== See also ==
- Association of the Polish People
