= Kalwaria Zebrzydowska Lanckorona railway station =

Railway station in Kalwaria Zebrzydowska, Poland

Kalwaria Zebrzydowska Lanckorona
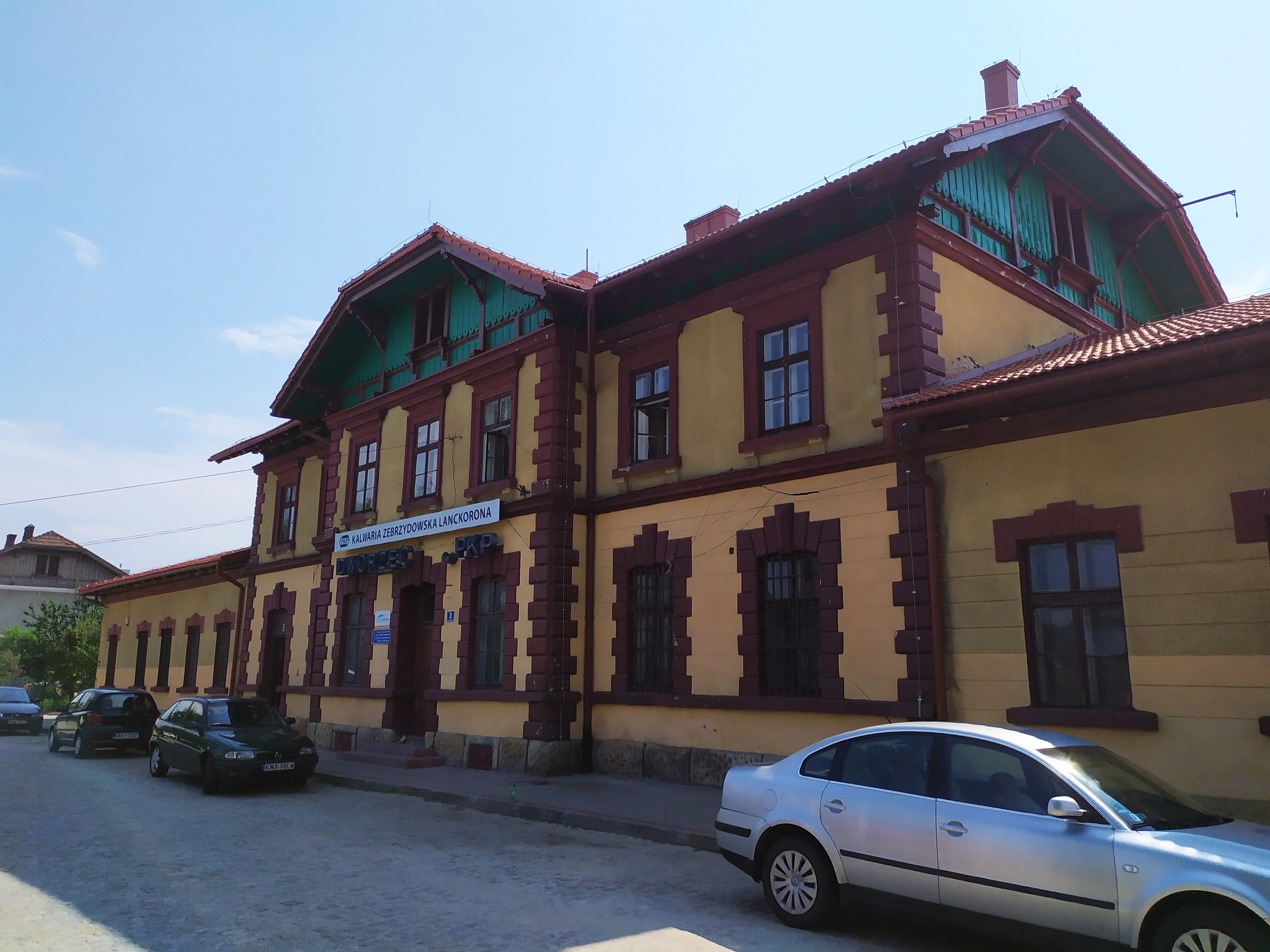
- Kalwaria Zebrzydowska Lanckorona railway station

General information
- Location: Kalwaria Zebrzydowska, Lesser Poland Voivodeship; Poland
- System: Railway Station
- Operator: PKP; Polregio
- Lines: 97: Skawina–Żywiec railway 117: Kalwaria Zebrzydowska–Bielsko-Biała railway
- Platforms: 3
- Tracks: 6
Location
- Location within Poland

Kalwaria Zebrzydowska Lanckorona railway station is a railway station in the town of Kalwaria Zebrzydowska, in the Lesser Poland Voivodeship, Poland. The station is located on the Skawina–Żywiec railway and Kalwaria Zebrzydowska–Bielsko-Biała railway. The train services are operated by PKP and Polregio.

The name Kalwaria Zebrzydowska Lanckorona is the longest name of a rail station in Poland.

== Train services ==
The station is served by the following services:

- Intercity services (IC) Warsaw - Kraków - Zakopane
- Intercity services (IC) Gdynia - Gdańsk - Bydgoszcz - Łódź - Czestochowa — Krakow — Zakopane
- Intercity services (IC) Bydgoszcz - Poznań - Leszno - Wrocław - Opole - Rybnik - Bielsko-Biała - Zakopane
- Intercity services (IC) Szczecin - Białogard - Szczecinek - Piła - Poznań - Ostrów Wielkopolski - Katowice - Zakopane
- Intercity services (TLK) Gdynia Główna — Zakopane
- Regional services (PR) K5 Kraków Główny — Skawina — Sucha Beskidzka — Chabówka — Nowy Targ — Zakopane

Route K52 services served this station until the opening of line 621 in 2022, allowing these services to bypass the station and the direction change required.

Preceding station	PKP Intercity	Following station
Kraków Główny towards Warszawa Wschodnia	IC	Maków Podhalański towards Zakopane
Kraków Główny towards Gdynia Główna	IC	Maków Podhalański towards Zakopane
Katowice towards Szczecin Główny	IC	Maków Podhalański towards Zakopane
Kraków Główny towards Gdynia Główna	TLK	Maków Podhalański towards Zakopane
Preceding station	Polregio	Following station
Przytkowice towards Kraków Główny	K5	Stronie towards Sucha Beskidzka, Chabówka or Zakopane
