= Nowy Targ railway station =

Railway station in Lesser Poland, Poland

Nowy Targ
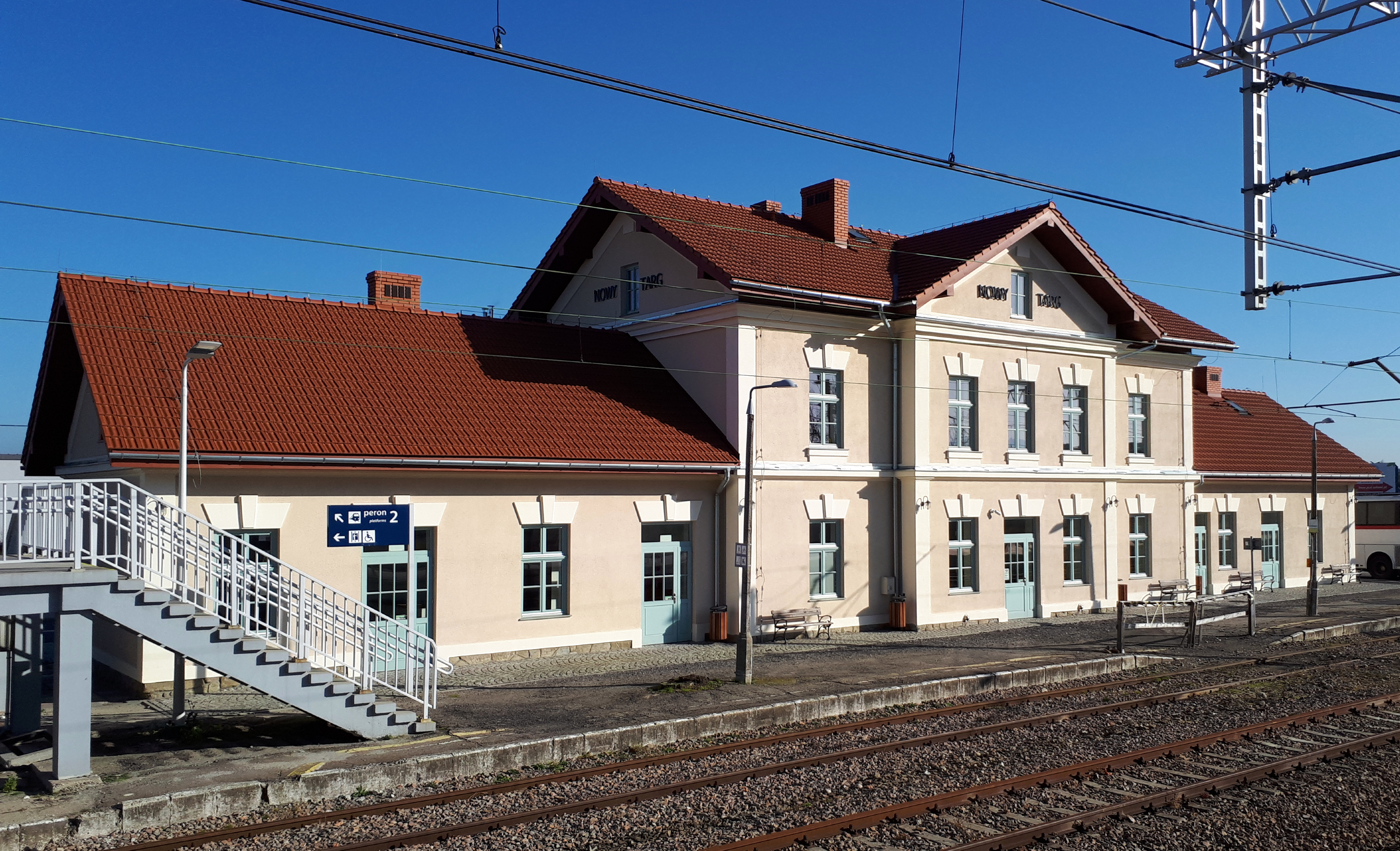

General information
- Location: Nowy Targ, Lesser Poland; Poland
- Coordinates: 49.4735229°N 20.0110169°E
- Owner: Polskie Koleje Państwowe S.A.
- Line: 99 Chabówka – Zakopane
- Platforms: 2
- Tracks: 3

Construction
- Structure type: Building: Yes

History
- Opened: 1899
Location

Nowy Targ railway station is a railway station in Nowy Targ (Lesser Poland), Poland. As of 2022, it is served by Silesian Railways (Silesian Voivodeship Railways), Polregio, and PKP Intercity (EIP, InterCity, and TLK services).

== Train services ==
The station is served by the following services:

- Express Intercity services (EIC) Warsaw - Kraków - Zakopane
- Intercity services (IC) Warsaw - Kraków - Zakopane
- Intercity services (IC) Gdynia - Gdańsk - Bydgoszcz - Łódź - Czestochowa — Krakow — Zakopane
- Intercity services (IC) Bydgoszcz - Poznań - Leszno - Wrocław - Opole - Rybnik - Bielsko-Biała - Zakopane
- Intercity services (IC) Szczecin - Białogard - Szczecinek - Piła - Poznań - Ostrów Wielkopolski - Katowice - Zakopane
- Intercity services (TLK) Gdynia Główna — Zakopane
- Regional Train of Podhale Region (Podhalańska Kolej Regionalna) (PKR) Zakopane - Nowy Targ
- Regional services (PR) K5 Kraków Główny — Skawina — Sucha Beskidzka — Chabówka — Nowy Targ — Zakopane
- Regional services (KŚ) S51 Katowice - Pszczyna - Bielsko-Biała Gł - Żywiec - Nowy Targ - Zakopane

K5 services operating between Chabówka or Nowy Targ and Zakopane only are branded as Podhalańska Kolej Regionalna (Podhale Regional Railway).

Preceding station	PKP Intercity	Following station
Chabówka towards Warszawa Wschodnia	EIC	Zakopane Terminus
Chabówka towards Warszawa Wschodnia	IC	Poronin towards Zakopane
Chabówka towards Gdynia Główna	IC	Poronin towards Zakopane
Chabówka towards Bydgoszcz Główna	IC	Poronin towards Zakopane
Chabówka towards Szczecin Główny	IC	Poronin towards Zakopane
Chabówka towards Gdynia Główna	TLK	Poronin towards Zakopane
Preceding station	Polregio	Following station
Lasek towards Kraków Główny, Sucha Beskidzka or Chabówka	K5	Szaflary towards Zakopane
Preceding station	KŚ	Following station
Pyzówka towards Częstochowa	S51	Biały Dunajec towards Zakopane
