= Poronin railway station =

Railway station in Lesser Poland, Poland

Poronin
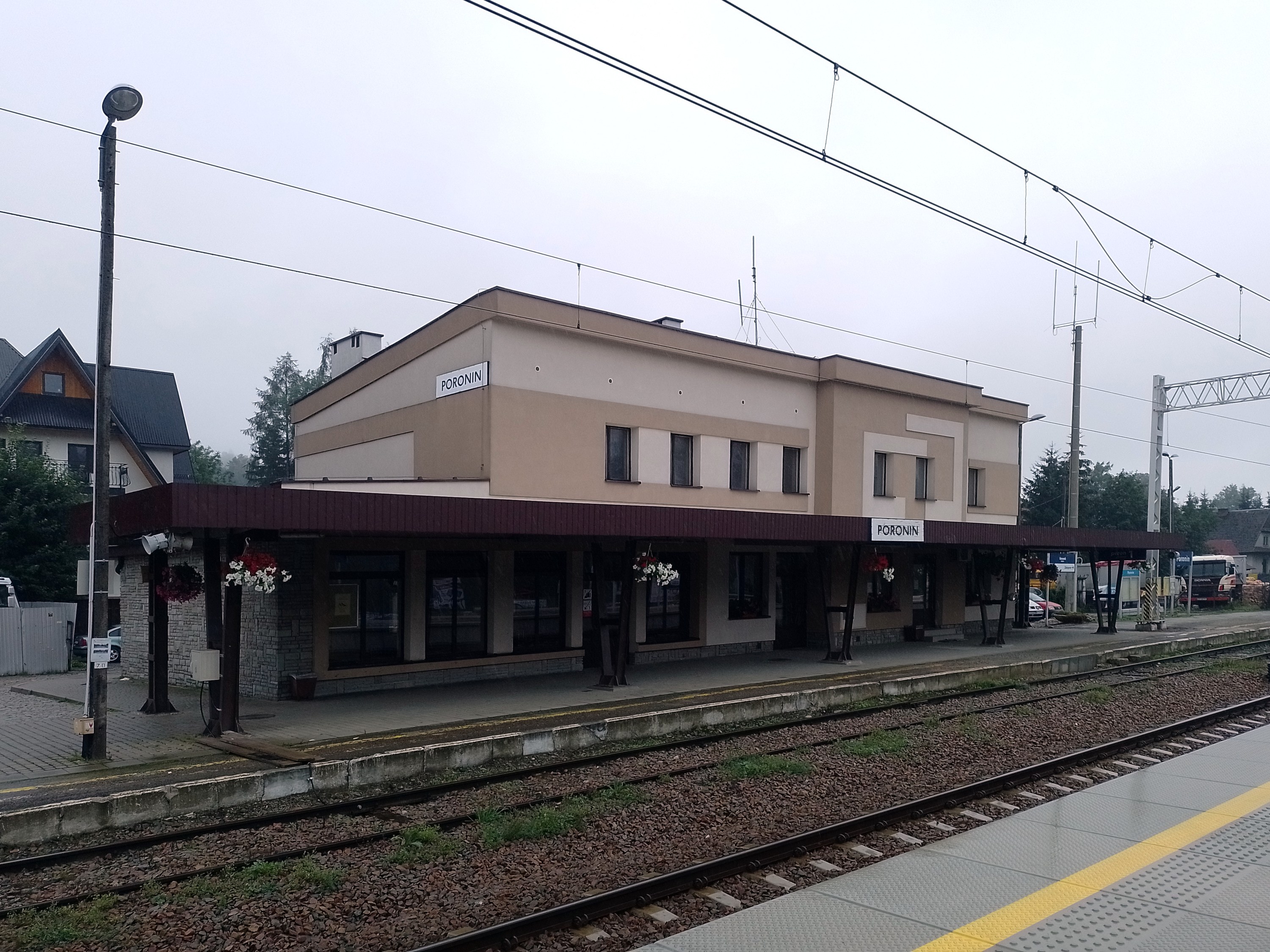
- Poronin railway station building, August 2022

General information
- Location: Poronin, Lesser Poland; Poland
- Coordinates: 49.3437401°N 20.0016458°E
- Owner: Polskie Koleje Państwowe S.A.
- Line: 99 Chabówka – Zakopane
- Platforms: 2
- Tracks: 3

Construction
- Structure type: Building: Yes

History
- Opened: 1899
Location

Poronin railway station is a railway station in Poronin (Lesser Poland), Poland. As of 2022, it is served by Silesian Railways (Silesian Voivodeship Railways), Polregio, and PKP Intercity (EIP, InterCity, and TLK services).

== Train services ==
The station is served by the following services:

- Intercity services (IC) Warsaw - Kraków - Zakopane
- Intercity services (IC) Gdynia - Gdańsk - Bydgoszcz - Łódź - Czestochowa — Krakow — Zakopane
- Intercity services (IC) Bydgoszcz - Poznań - Leszno - Wrocław - Opole - Rybnik - Bielsko-Biała - Zakopane
- Intercity services (IC) Szczecin - Białogard - Szczecinek - Piła - Poznań - Ostrów Wielkopolski - Katowice - Zakopane
- Intercity services (TLK) Gdynia Główna — Zakopane
- Regional services (PR) K5 Kraków Główny — Skawina — Sucha Beskidzka — Chabówka — Nowy Targ — Zakopane
- Regional services (KŚ) S51 Katowice - Pszczyna - Bielsko-Biała Gł - Żywiec - Nowy Targ - Zakopane

| Preceding station | PKP Intercity | Following station |
|---|---|---|
| Nowy Targ towards Warszawa Wschodnia | IC | Zakopane Terminus |
| Nowy Targ towards Gdynia Główna | IC | Zakopane Terminus |
| Nowy Targ towards Bydgoszcz Główna | IC | Zakopane Terminus |
| Nowy Targ towards Szczecin Główny | IC | Zakopane Terminus |
| Nowy Targ towards Gdynia Główna | TLK | Zakopane Terminus |
| Preceding station | Polregio | Following station |
| Biały Dunajec towards Kraków Główny, Sucha Beskidzka, Chabówka or Nowy Targ | K5 | Poronin Misiagi towards Zakopane |
| Preceding station | KŚ | Following station |
| Biały Dunajec towards Częstochowa | S51 | Zakopane Terminus |
