= Maków Podhalański railway station =

Railway station in Lesser Poland, Poland

Maków Podhalański
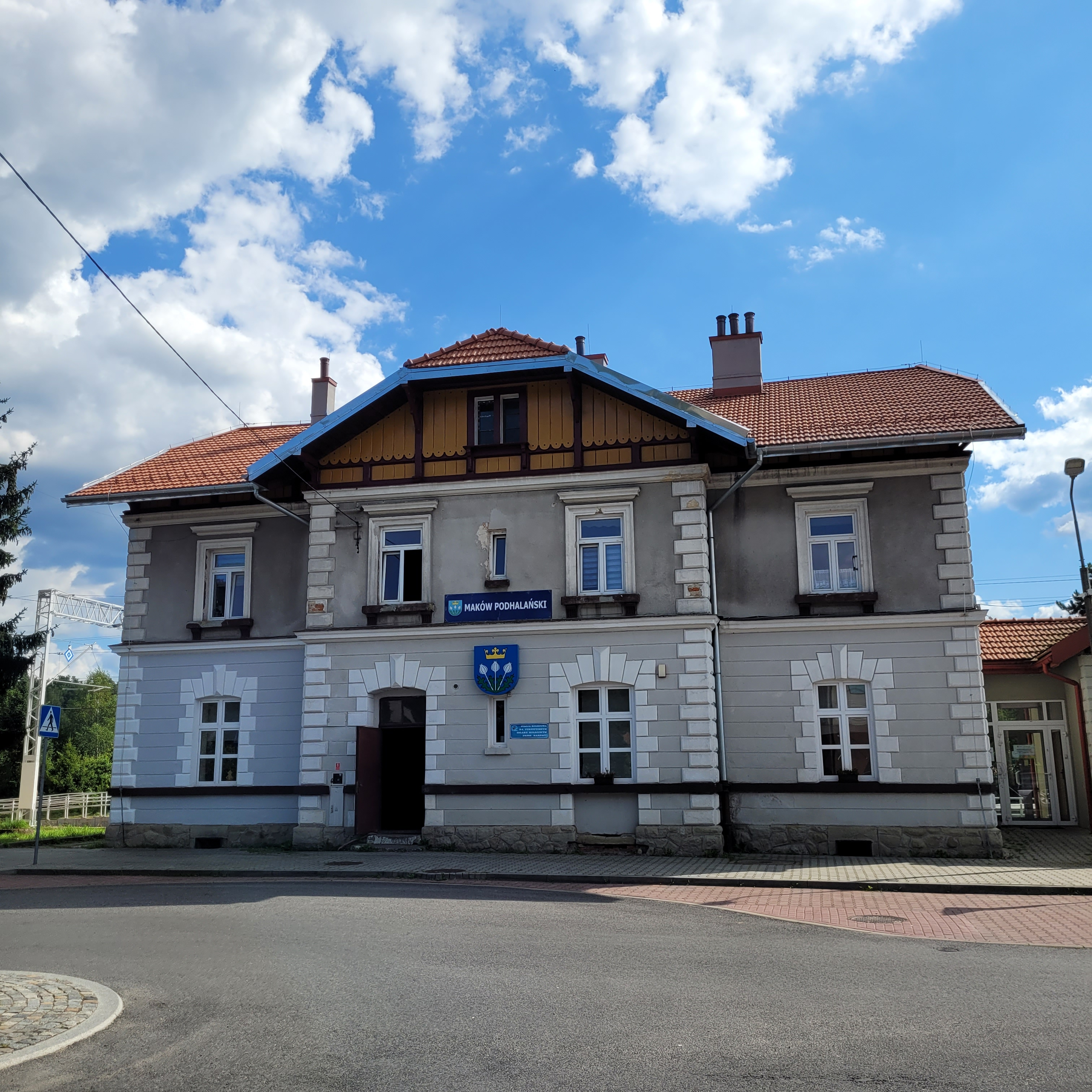

General information
- Location: Maków Podhalański, Lesser Poland; Poland
- Coordinates: 49.7268822°N 19.6762679°E
- Owner: Polskie Koleje Państwowe S.A.
- Line: 98: Sucha Beskidzka – Chabówka
- Platforms: 1
- Tracks: 2

Construction
- Structure type: Building: Yes

History
- Opened: 1884
Location

Maków Podhalański railway station is a railway station in Maków Podhalański (Lesser Poland), Poland. As of 2022, it is served by Silesian Railways (Silesian Voivodeship Railways), Polregio, and PKP Intercity (EIP, InterCity, and TLK services).

== Train services ==
The station is served by the following services:

- Intercity services (IC) Warsaw - Kraków - Zakopane
- Intercity services (IC) Gdynia - Gdańsk - Bydgoszcz - Łódź - Czestochowa — Krakow — Zakopane
- Intercity services (IC) Bydgoszcz - Poznań - Leszno - Wrocław - Opole - Rybnik - Bielsko-Biała - Zakopane
- Intercity services (IC) Szczecin - Białogard - Szczecinek - Piła - Poznań - Ostrów Wielkopolski - Katowice - Zakopane
- Intercity services (TLK) Gdynia Główna — Zakopane
- Regional services (PR) K5 Kraków Główny — Skawina — Sucha Beskidzka — Chabówka — Nowy Targ — Zakopane
- Regional services (KŚ) S51 Katowice - Pszczyna - Bielsko-Biała Gł - Żywiec - Nowy Targ - Zakopane

Preceding station	PKP Intercity	Following station
Sucha Beskidzka Zamek towards Warszawa Wschodnia	IC	Chabówka towards Zakopane
Sucha Beskidzka Zamek towards Gdynia Główna	IC	Chabówka towards Zakopane
Sucha Beskidzka towards Bydgoszcz Główna	IC	Chabówka towards Zakopane
Sucha Beskidzka Zamek towards Szczecin Główny	IC	Chabówka towards Zakopane
Sucha Beskidzka Zamek towards Gdynia Główna	TLK	Chabówka towards Zakopane
Preceding station	Polregio	Following station
Sucha Beskidzka towards Kraków Główny or Sucha Beskidzka	K5	Juszczyn towards Chabówka or Zakopane
Preceding station	KŚ	Following station
Sucha Beskidzka towards Katowice	S51	Kojszówka towards Zakopane
