= Sucha Beskidzka Zamek railway station =

Railway station in Lesser Poland, Poland

Sucha Beskidzka Zamek
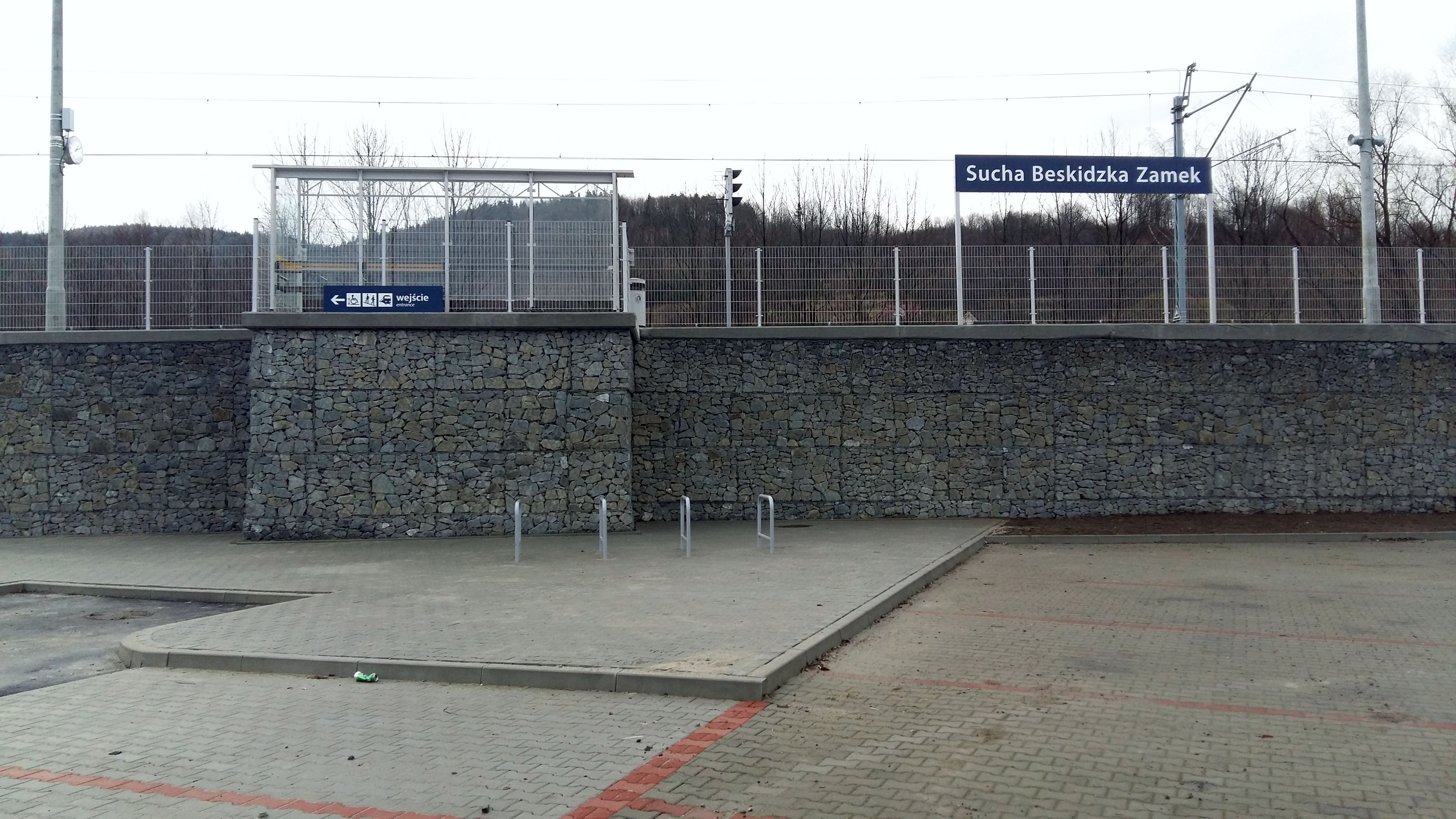

General information
- Location: Sucha Beskidzka, Lesser Poland; Poland
- Coordinates: 49.7440116°N 19.600891°E
- Owner: Polskie Koleje Państwowe S.A.
- Line: 625: Sucha Beskidzka Północ – Sucha Beskidzka Południe
- Platforms: 1
- Tracks: 1

Construction
- Structure type: Building: Yes

History
- Opened: 2017
Location

Sucha Beskidzka Zamek railway station is a railway station in Sucha Beskidzka (Lesser Poland), Poland. As of 2022, it is served by PKP Intercity (EIP, InterCity, and TLK services). This station is located about 2 km East of the town's principal railway station (Sucha Beskidzka railway station). This station is named after the nearby Sucha Beskidzka Castle, as the word Zamek means castle.

== Train services ==
The station is served by the following services:

- Intercity services (IC) Warsaw - Kraków - Zakopane
- Intercity services (IC) Gdynia - Gdańsk - Bydgoszcz - Łódź - Czestochowa — Krakow — Zakopane
- Intercity services (IC) Bydgoszcz - Poznań - Leszno - Wrocław - Opole - Rybnik - Bielsko-Biała - Zakopane
- Intercity services (IC) Szczecin - Białogard - Szczecinek - Piła - Poznań - Ostrów Wielkopolski - Katowice - Zakopane
- Intercity services (TLK) Gdynia Główna — Zakopane

Preceding station	PKP Intercity	Following station
Kalwaria Zebrzydowska Lanckorona towards Warszawa Wschodnia	IC	Maków Podhalański towards Zakopane
Kalwaria Zebrzydowska Lanckorona towards Gdynia Główna	IC	Maków Podhalański towards Zakopane
Kalwaria Zebrzydowska Lanckorona towards Szczecin Główny	IC	Maków Podhalański towards Zakopane
Kalwaria Zebrzydowska Lanckorona towards Gdynia Główna	TLK	Maków Podhalański towards Zakopane
