= Rabka-Zdrój railway station =

Railway station in Rabka-Zdrój, Poland

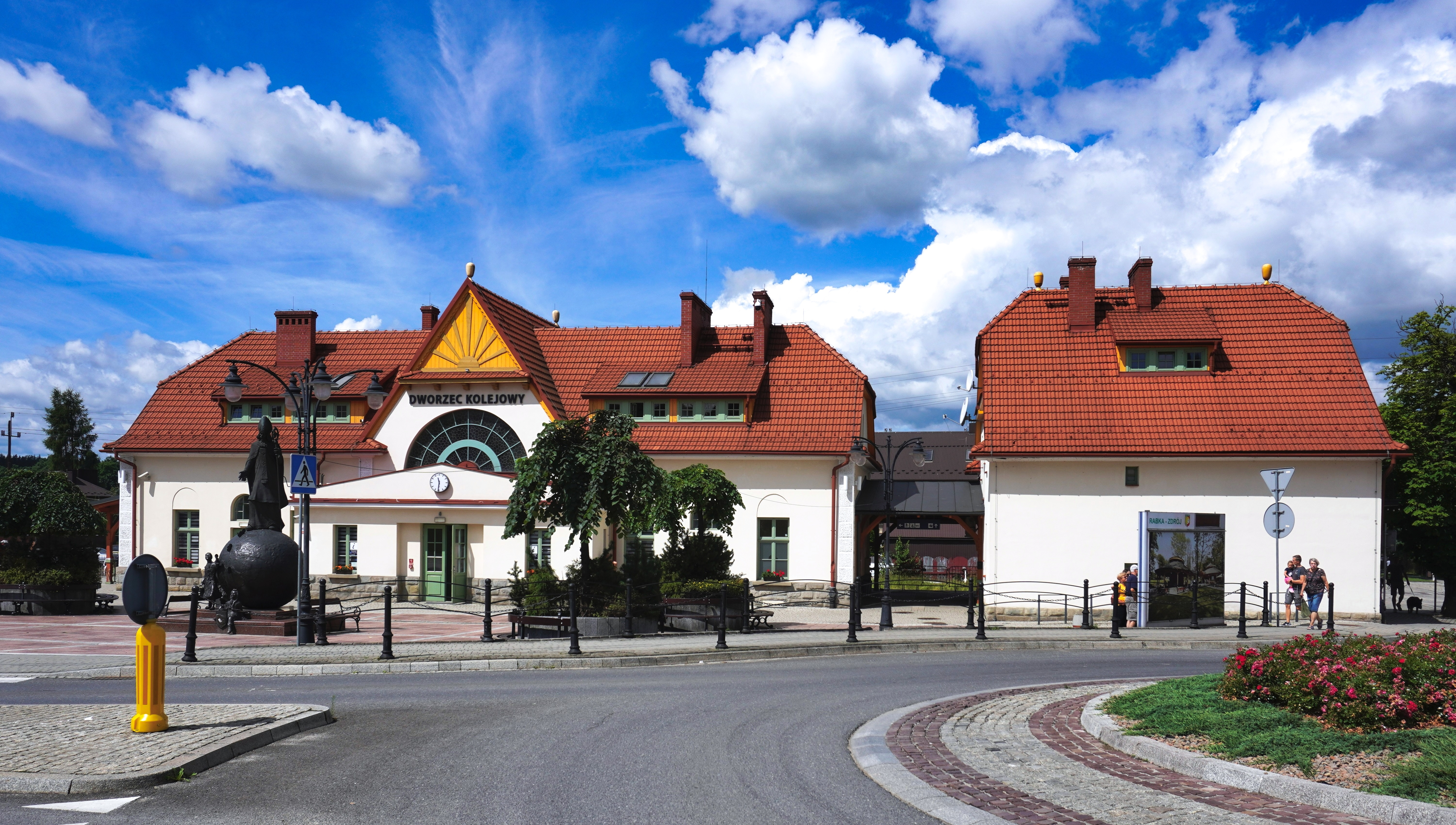
- Station building, view from Zakopiańska Street

General information
- Location: 27 Orkana Street, Rabka-Zdrój, Lesser Poland Voivodeship; Poland
- Coordinates: 49°36′37″N 19°57′08″E
- Operator: Polish State Railways, PKP Polskie Linie Kolejowe
- Line: Chabówka–Nowy Sącz railway
- Platforms: 1

History
- Opened: 1884
- Former names: Rabka (1884–1926); Rabka Zdrój (1927–1939); Rabka Zdroj (1939–1945)
Location
- Location within Poland

Rabka-Zdrój is a railway station in Rabka-Zdrój, Lesser Poland Voivodeship, Poland. According to the Polish State Railways' classification, it is categorized as a tourist station.

== Passenger traffic ==
Year	Daily passenger exchange
2017	100–149
2022	150–199

The station was opened in 1884 as part of the Galician Transversal Railway. In 1993, the station complex was listed as a heritage site. From 1927 to 1939 and 1945 to 1952, it was classified as a railway station.

== Location ==
The railway station is located in the western part of Rabka-Zdrój at 27 Orkana Street. Nearby are two bus stations, Rabka-Zdrój St. Nicholas Square and Rabka-Zdrój Orkana Street, as well as a parking lot.

== History ==
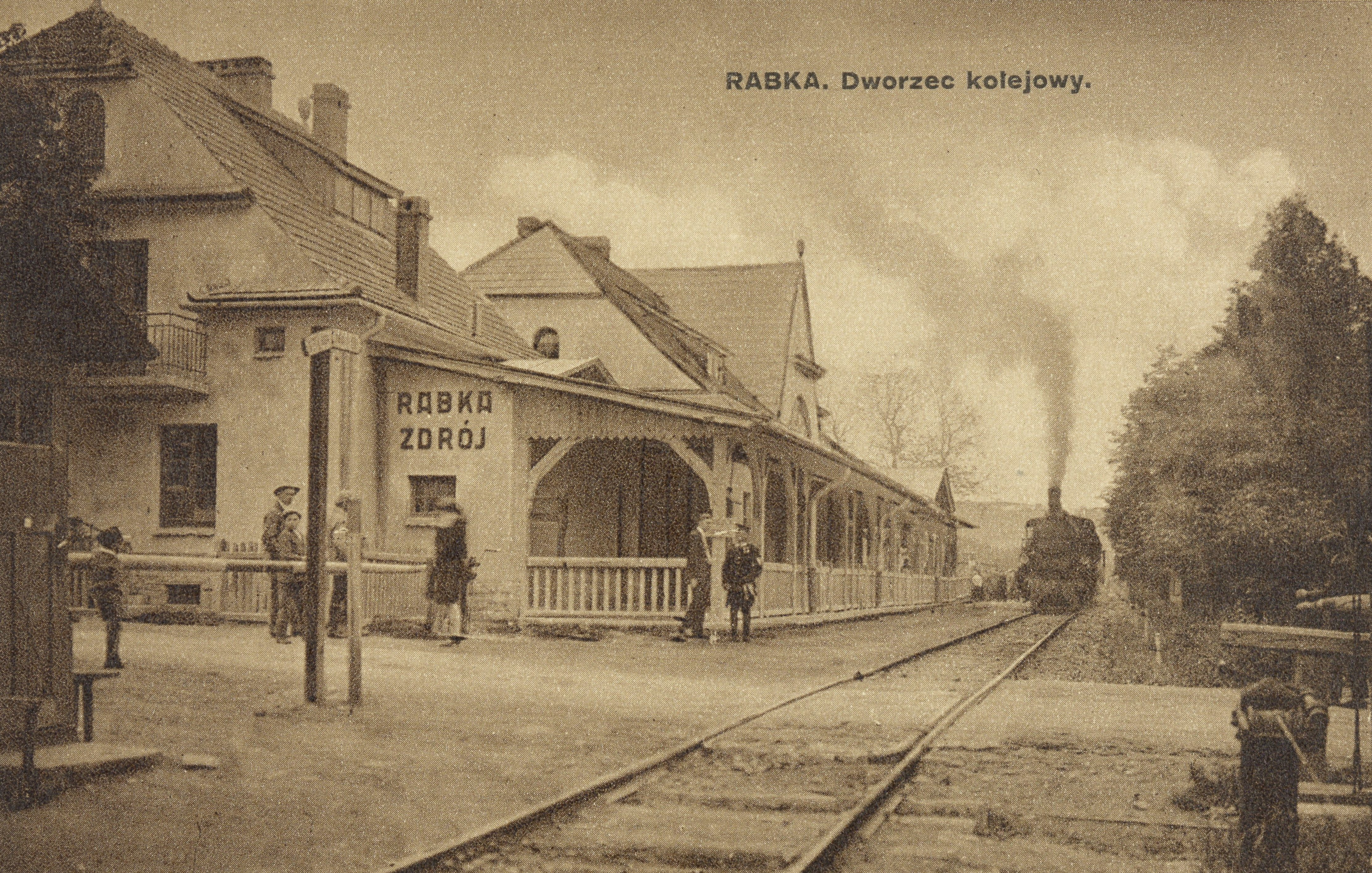
Railway station around 1931

In the 1850s, Galicia had only one railway connection to Austria via the Emperor Ferdinand Northern Railway (Vienna to Kraków) and the Galician Railway of Archduke Charles Louis (east from Kraków). The Austrian government showed little interest in expanding the rail network. During the Austro-Prussian War of 1866, the Oświęcim railway station was briefly occupied, and several bridges were destroyed, disrupting the rail link between the empire and Galicia. By 1868, various proposals for new rail connections were presented, but progress was slow.

On 5 April 1881, a bill was proposed for the construction of a transversal railway, connecting existing routes into a unified network from Żywiec to Husiatyn near the Russian border. The project was later expanded to include a section from Żywiec to the Hungarian border at Zwardoń, from Podgórze to Oświęcim and Skawina to Sucha Beskidzka. Construction of the Żywiec–Nowy Sącz section began on 17 October 1882. By late 1884, all lines of the Galician Transversal Railway, totaling 555 km, were opened, including the station at Rabka.

In 1925, a station building was constructed. On 17 December 1993, the station complex (station building, residential house, and gatekeeper's hut) was added to the heritage register.

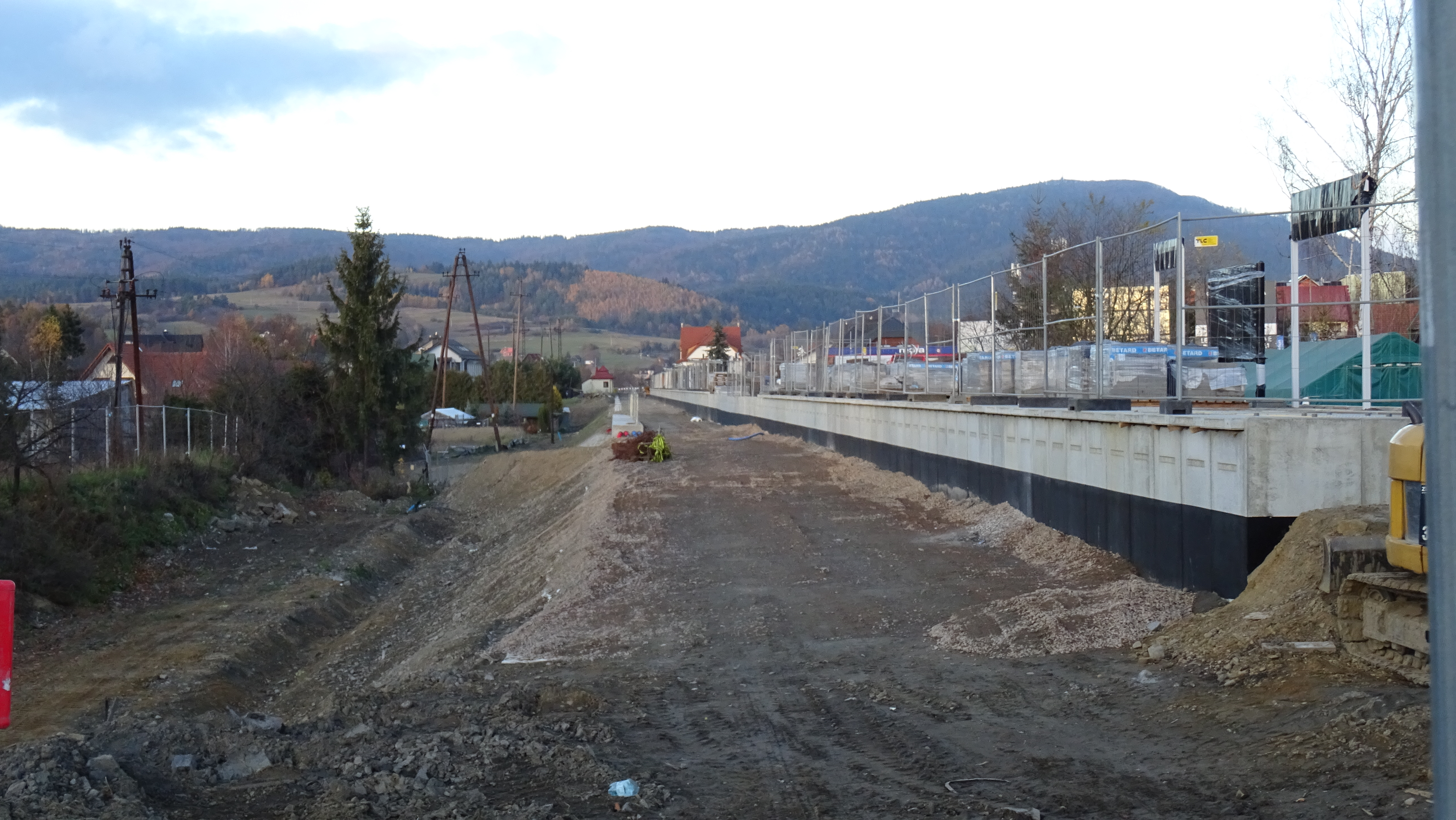
Station platform during modernization, view toward Chabówka

Passenger service toward Nowy Sącz was suspended on 22 March 2004.

In September 2010, the ticket office and waiting room were closed.

In May 2013, the Profes company began renovating the station. The building was thoroughly refurbished inside and out, with a waiting area, ticket office, and restrooms designated for passengers on the ground floor. The former waiting room, ticket office, parts of the ground floor, and the entire upper floor were converted for use by the public library. The renovated station reopened on 11 December 2014, with the Municipal Public Library relocating to the building in March 2015 and a Tourist Information Point opening in May 2015.

== Railways ==
The station is located on the single-track Chabówka–Nowy Sącz railway, which is electrified on the Chabówka–Rabka-Zdrój section.

== Infrastructure ==
The station features one single-edge platform, 200 m long and 24 cm above the rail head. The platform is covered and equipped with benches and loudspeakers for train announcements.

== Train services ==
The station serves Regio trains operated by Polregio, running between Kraków Główny and Zakopane. Trains change direction at Rabka-Zdrój, arriving from and returning toward Chabówka railway station, due to the track layout at Chabówka. This direction change is only possible for trains with control cabs at both ends, as the track layout does not allow locomotives with carriages to reverse. The turnaround time at Rabka is approximately 6 minutes.

Until 21 March 2004, passenger trains also operated toward Nowy Sącz.

In addition to regular passenger services, occasional retro trains operated by the Chabówka Rolling Stock Heritage Park at Rabka-Zdrój.

== Gallery ==
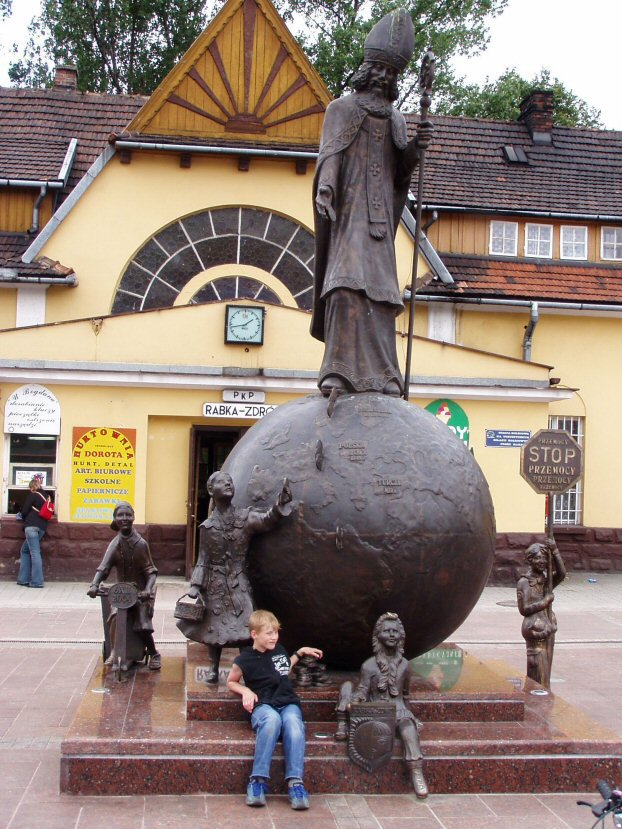
St. Nicholas Monument

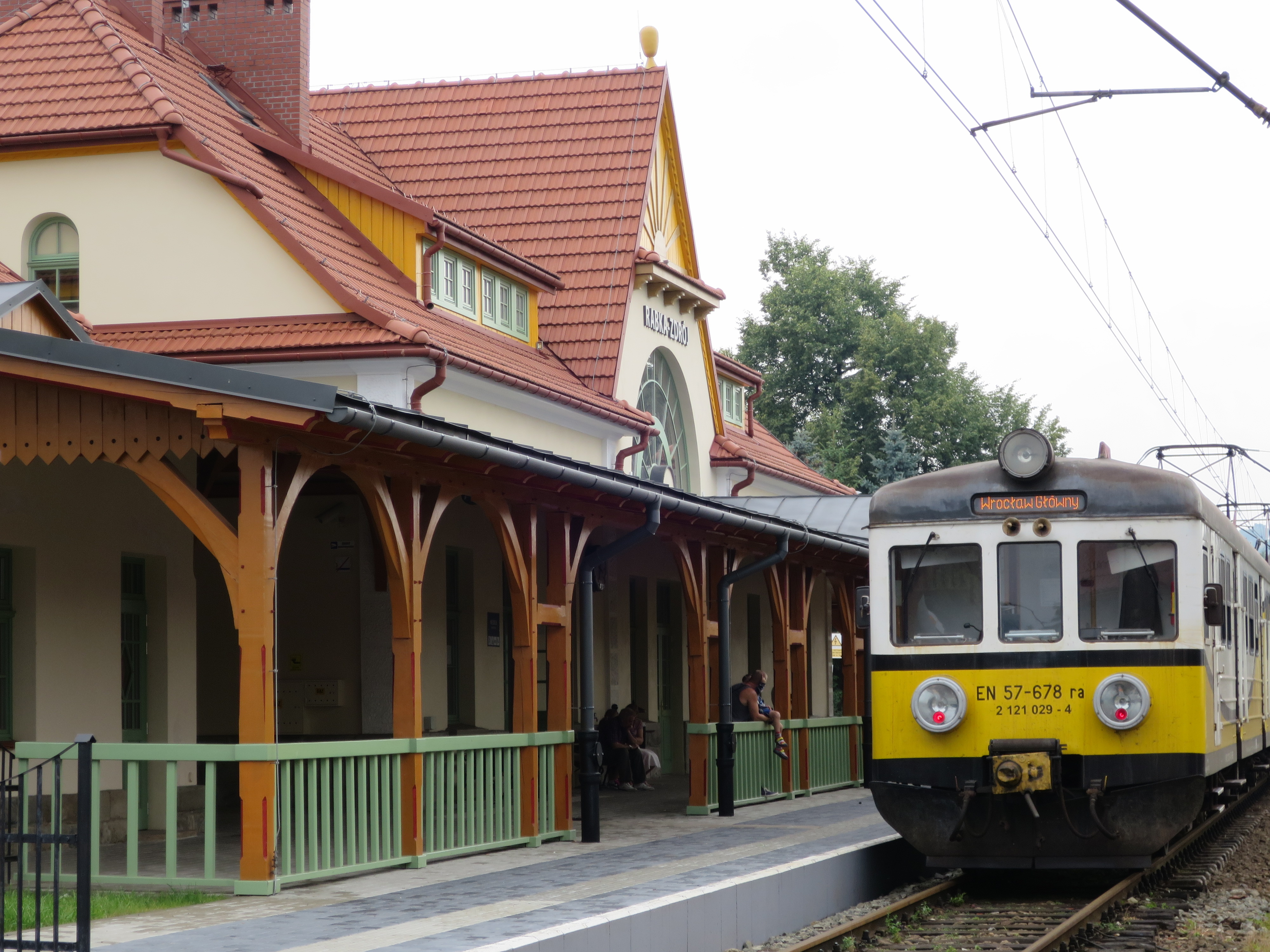
EN57 at the platform

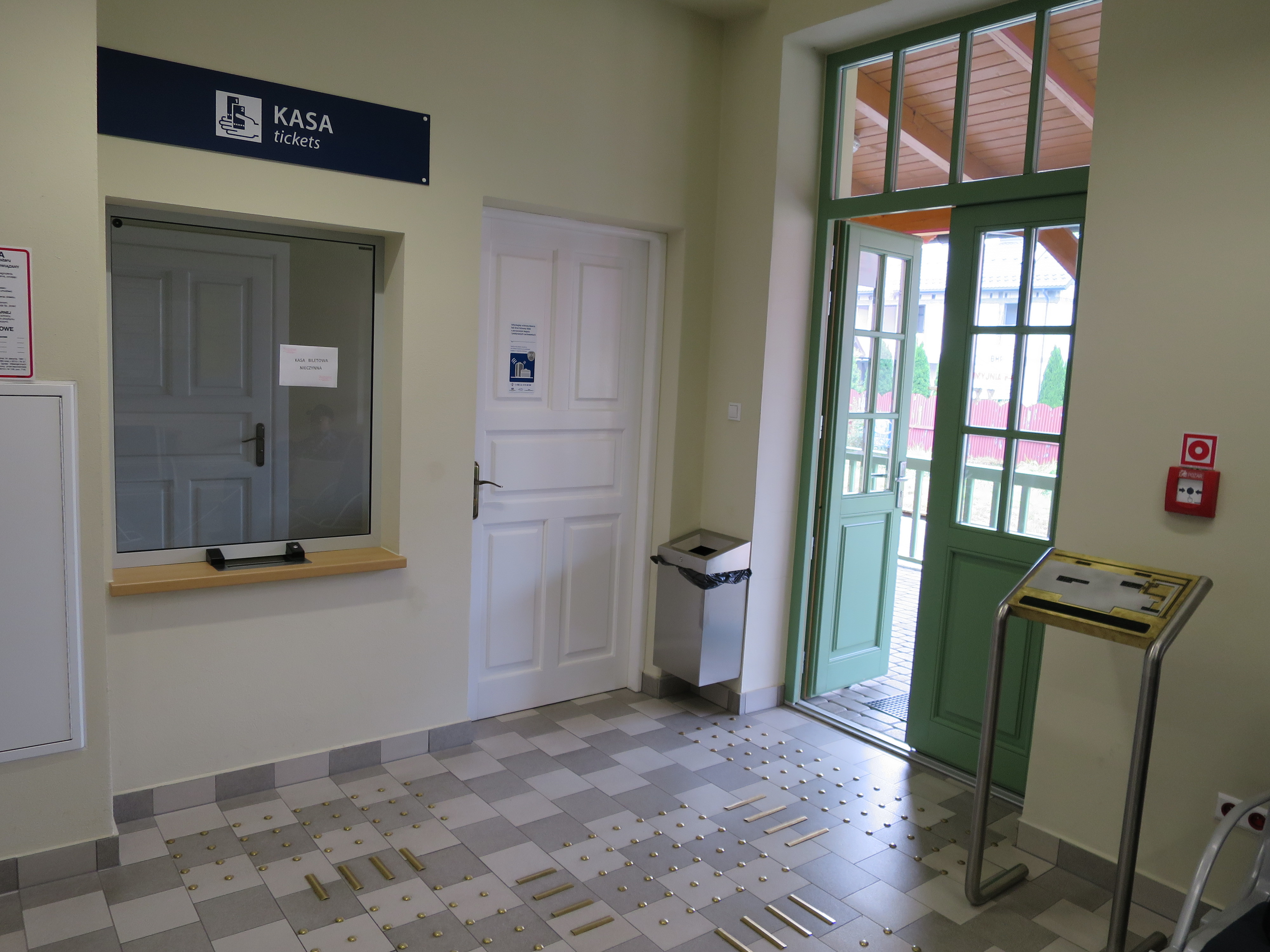
Closed ticket office

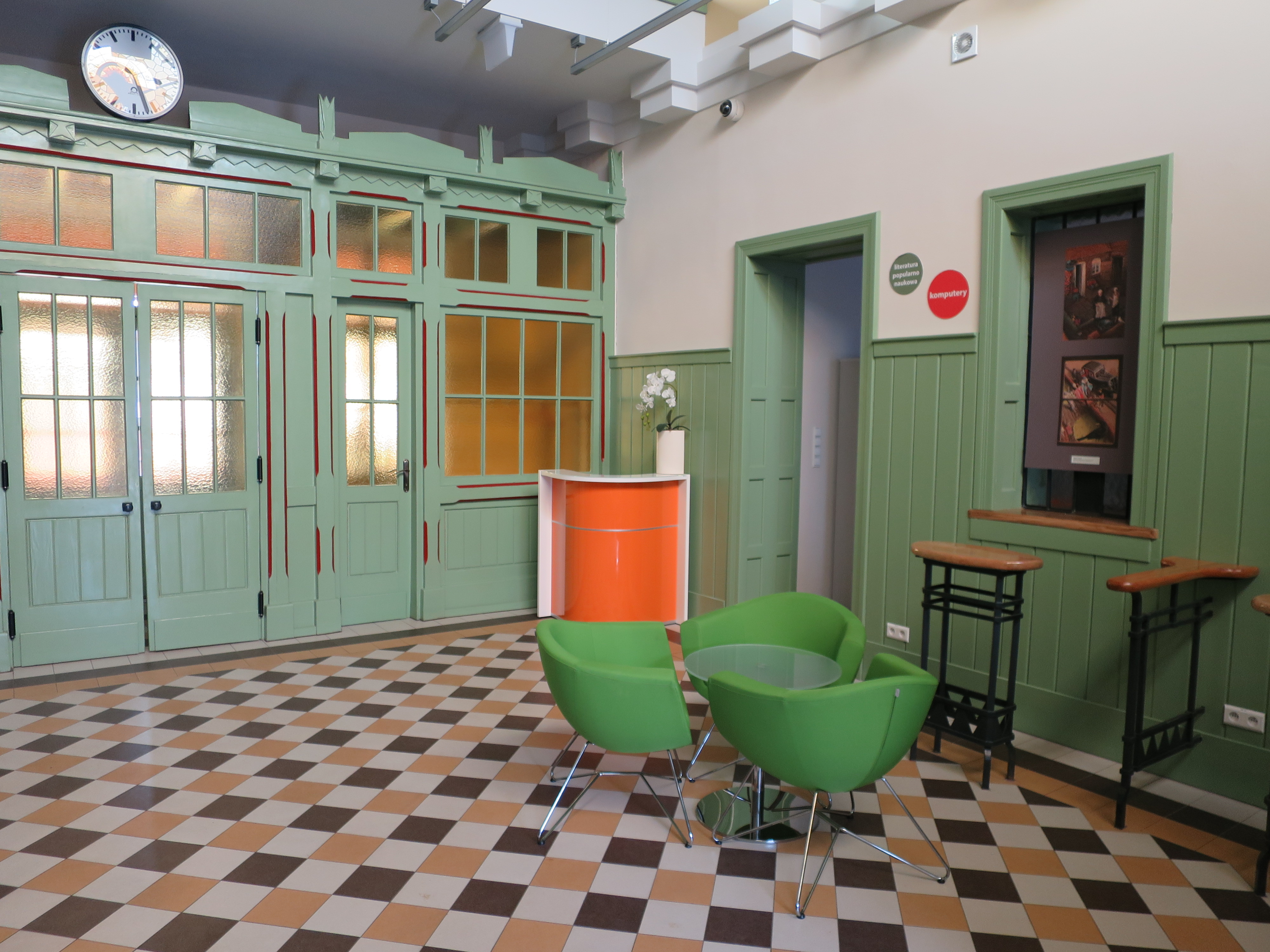
Station interior

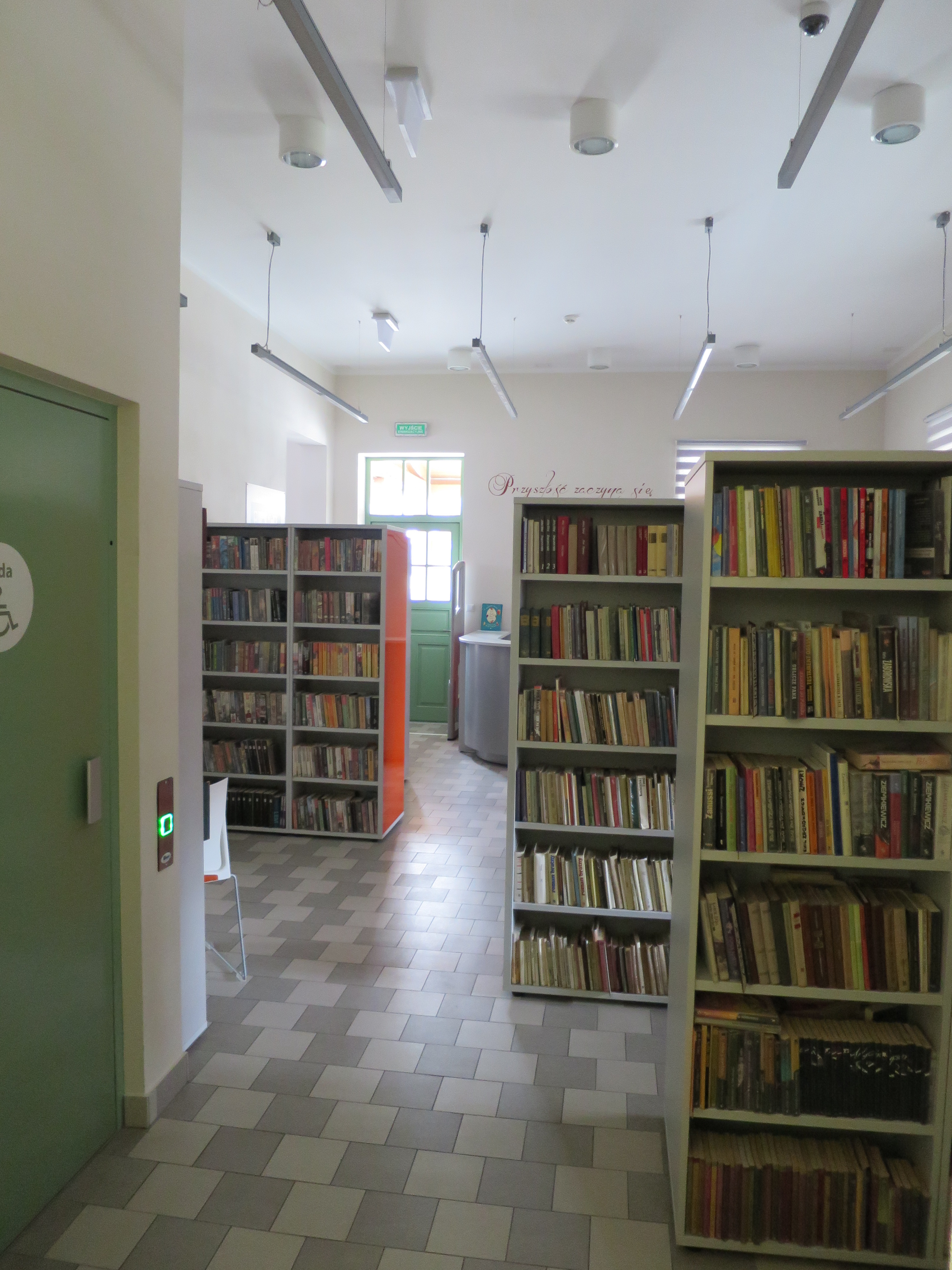
Library
