= Market Square, Nowy Targ =

Square in Nowy Targ, Poland

Market Square
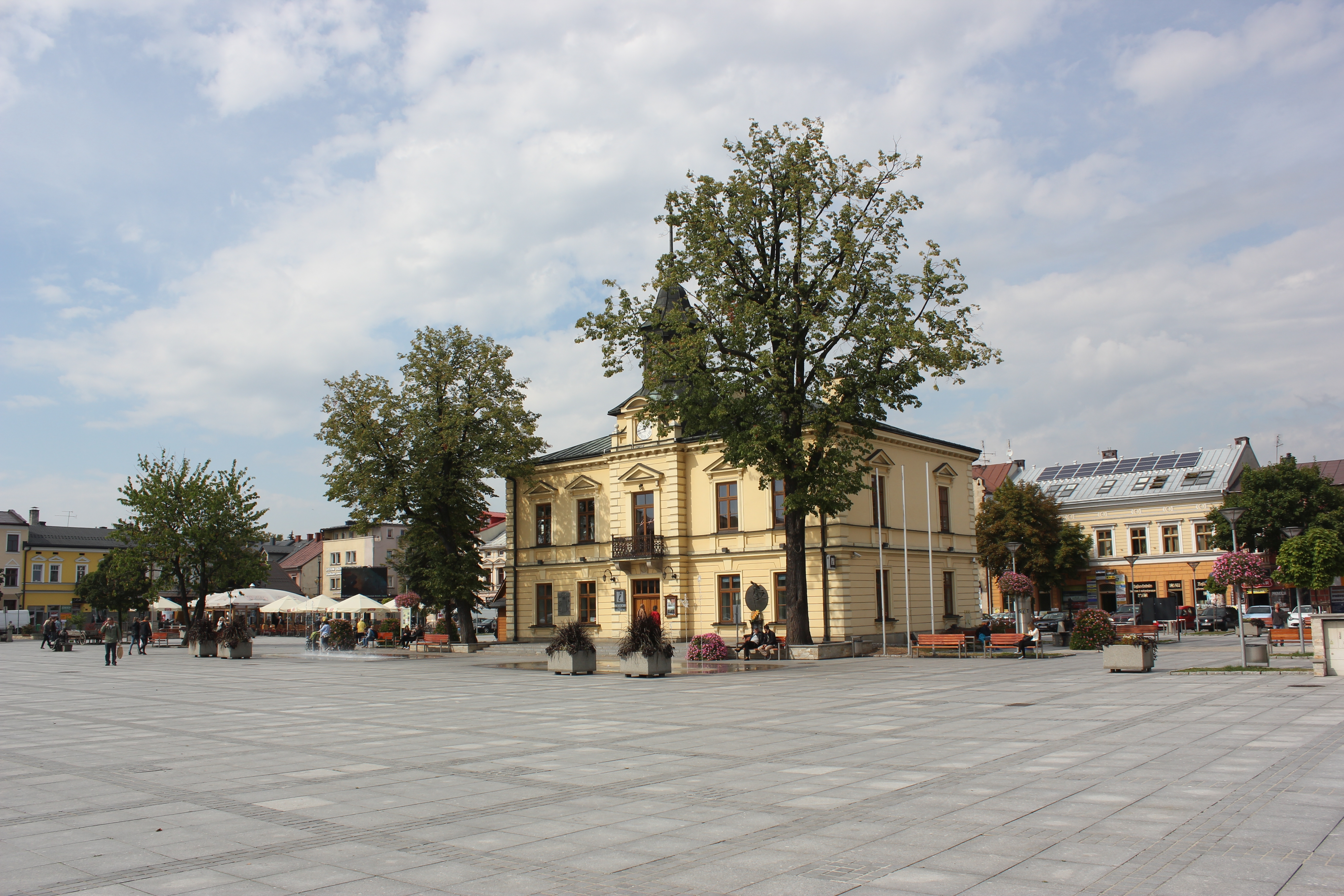
- The Town Hall as seen from the south-east.
- Interactive map of Market Square
- Native name: Rynek (Polish)
- Type: Medieval market square
- Location: Nowy Targ, Poland
- Coordinates: 49°28′57″N 20°1′50.16″E

The Market Square (Polish: Rynek [ˈrɨnɛk]) in Nowy Targ is located in the center of the town. It was laid out for the first time in 1346, when the city was founded. There are 8 streets leading to the Market Square - two to each corner: Szaflarska St and Harcerska St to the south-eastern corner, John III Sobieski St and Tadeusz Kościuszko St to the north-east one, St. Catherine St and Szkolna St to the north-west one, and Kolejowa St and Casimir III the Great St to the south-west one. It has the shape of a rectangle with the dimensions of 138 x 110 m, which gives the area of 1.5 hectares (3.7 acres).

== Buildings on the Market Square ==
=== Town hall ===
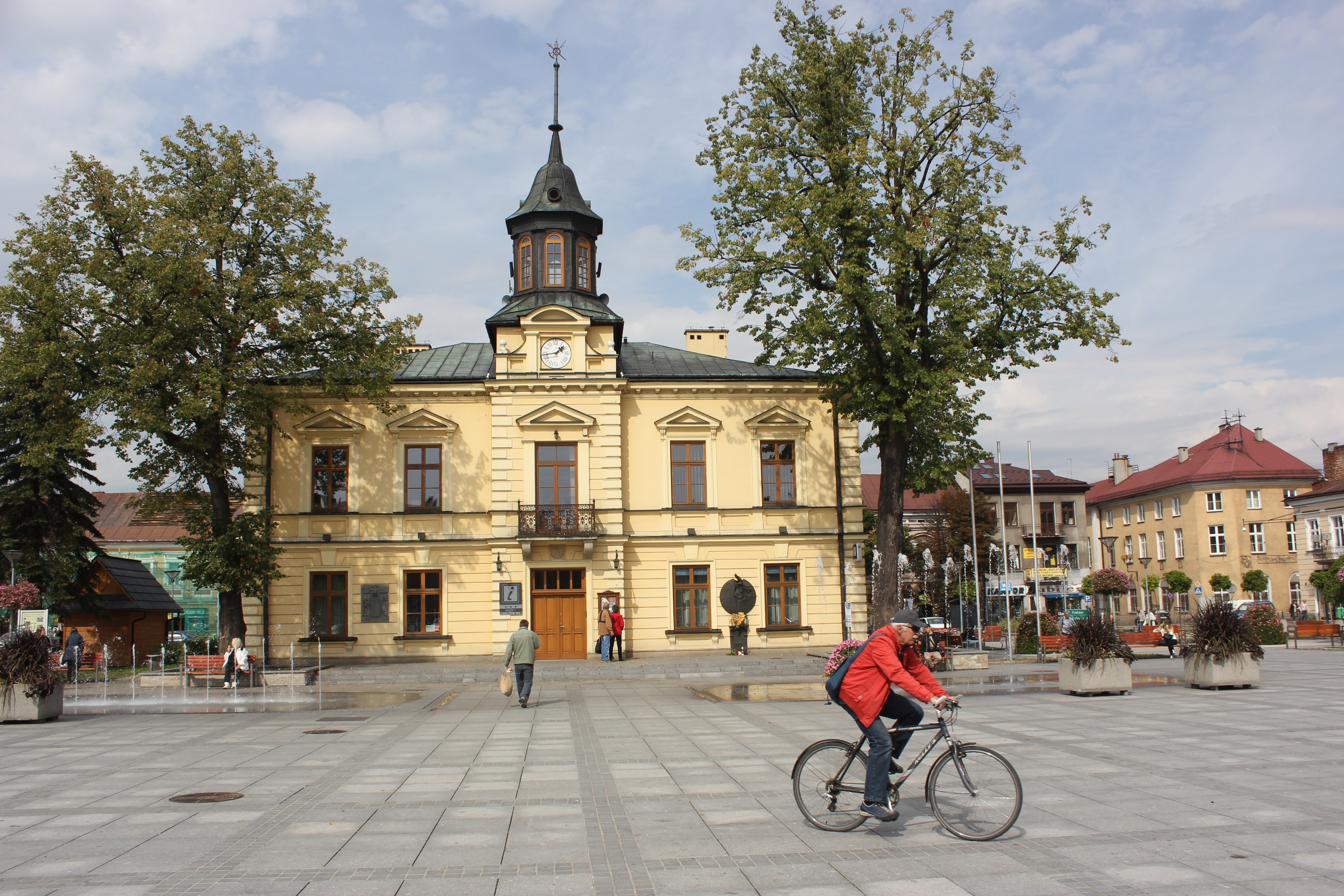
The Town Hall in Nowy Targ and the post office (in the background)

The town hall building in Nowy Targ is a two-story neoclassical building. It dates back to the mid-nineteenth century. At the front of the town hall stands a clock tower with a glass lantern, covered with a cupola with a spire.

The town hall stands on the site of an earlier building with the same function. The description of the previous town hall can be found in documents from 1767. The town hall was then a recently built wooden building. It was covered with a shingle roof and surrounded by arcades supported by poles. It also had a tower. Apart from the seat of the municipal authorities, there was also a prison. The foundations of the former town hall were discovered during the revitalization of the Market Square in 2012.

=== Townhouses ===
Until the end of the 18th century, the Market Square was surrounded by wooden buildings. They were consumed by a fire in 1784. To fire-proof the town, it was decided to build brick houses (Polish: kamienica). One of the first was erected at the end of the 18th century by the Strzałkowski family.

In the mid-nineteenth century, the buildings in the Market Square were predominantly made of brick. There are historic tenement houses from that period, most of them located on the northern side of the Market Square. A typical one is a two-story tenement house with a three-axis façade.

==== Northern frontage ====
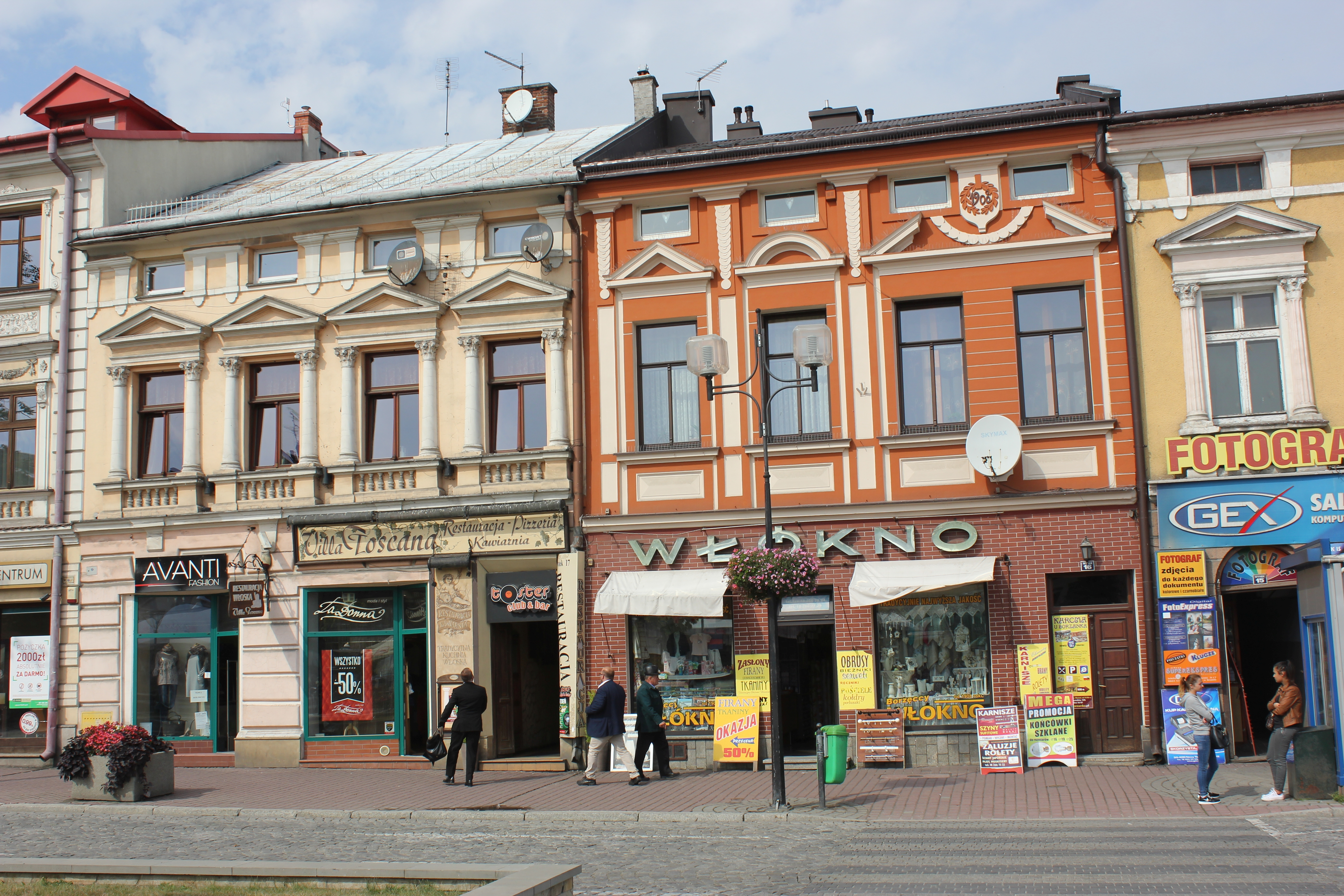
Tenement houses No. 16 and 17 at the northern frontage of the Market Square

Tenement house no. 9 draws attention on the northern frontage of the Market Square. It originally belonged to the Herz family. The façade of this house is decorated with a row of rusticated pilasters. The tenement house no. 10 looks similar, and in the neighboring house the attention is drawn to a wrought-iron balcony. These tenement houses were built in the second half of the 19th century.

==== Southern frontage ====
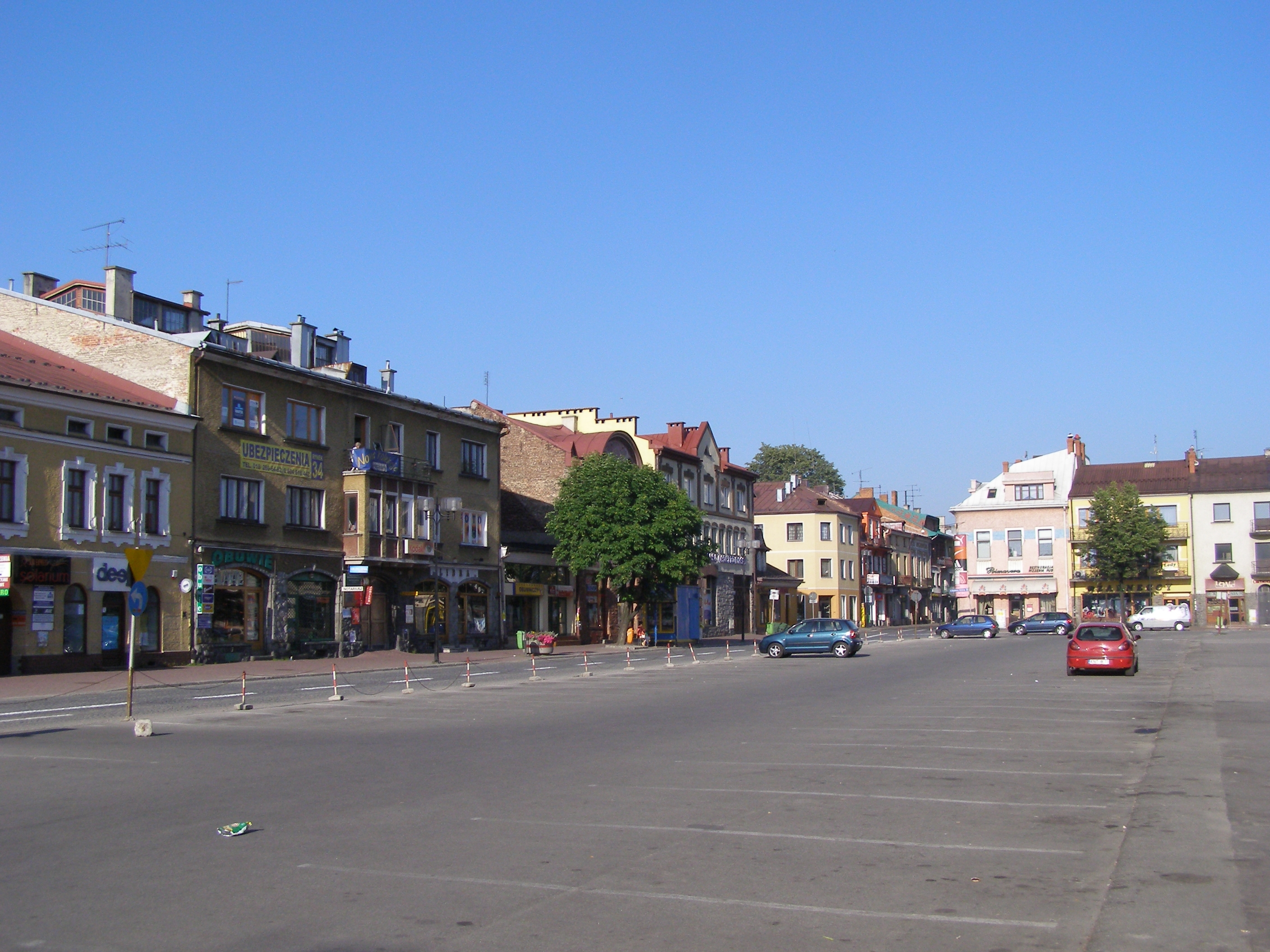
View of the southern frontage (before the reconstruction of the square)

The southern frontage is much less preserved than the northern one. On the southern frontage, an Art Nouveau building decorated with a semicircular attic wall stands out. It was built at the beginning of the 20th century.

==== Eastern and western frontages ====
The original buildings at the eastern and western frontages were mostly replaced by modern houses. Their architecture is seen as not very good.

=== Chapel of St. John Cantius ===
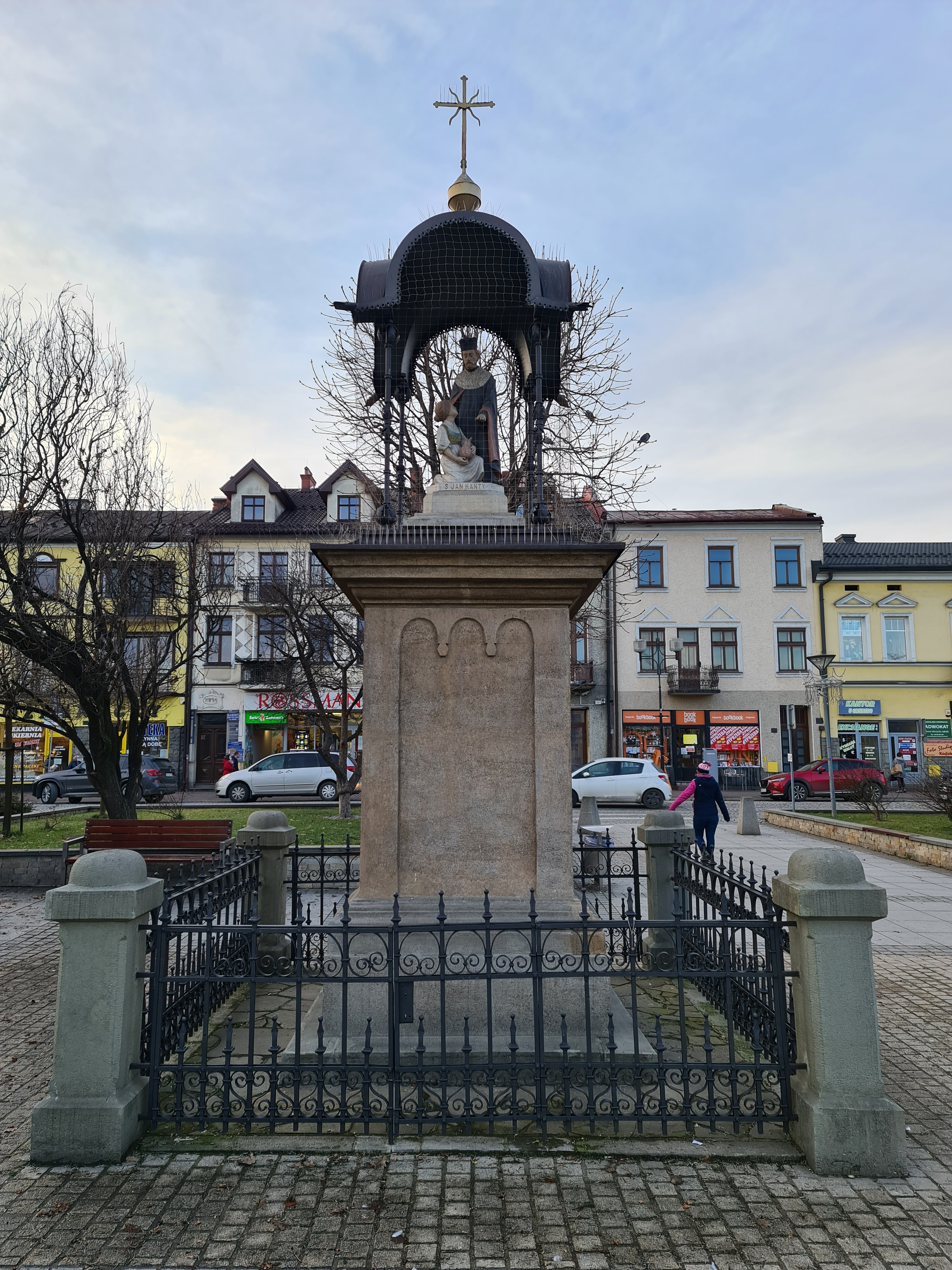
Sculpture of St. John Cantius

The chapel was built after the great fire of Nowy Targ in 1784. The chapel is marked on the cadastral plan, which was made after the city was rebuilt in 1846. On the plan, the chapel is located in the western part of the Market Square and surrounded by four trees.

A sculpture of St. John Cantius was put in the chapel in 1904 on the initiative of councilor Ignacy Moczydłowski. Its general composition scheme is similar to the previous, wooden sculpture. It depicts a legend from the saint's life: St. John Cantius, professor of the University of Kraków, miraculously glued a clay jug broken by a girl from Łobzów. The sculpture is made of Pińczów limestone and polychrome, placed on a high pedestal and covered with a copper roof.

== History ==
Nowy Targ was founded as a trading town, which is why the Market Square is spacious. Centuries ago, once a year, a fair was held there. It was attended by crowds of merchants and people from all over Podhale. Later on Polish kings introduced more fairs, and finally in 1920 there were 26 of them in a year. In 1925 the mayor Józef Rajski decided that the fair would be held once a week. Over time, the fair was moved from the Market Square to the Bereki district, and now takes place in the new market area on the bank of the Dunajec River.

After a fire in 1784, the Austrian staroste, Tischirsch von Siegstetten, initiated the reconstruction of the town. He imposed on the city a new street grid plan, which did not align with the old layout of the buildings. The Market Square was then enlarged.

After 1884, a new brick town hall was built. The building remains unchanged since.

Between 1950 and 2012 a monument to Władysław Orkan stood in the Market Square. Originally, the monument was erected in 1934 in Mały Rynek (today's Juliusz Słowacki Square). After the outbreak of World War II, the occupying Germans intended to destroy the monument. The Nowy Targ inhabitants, who were ordered to do it, only destroyed the pedestal and buried the statue in the area of the municipal power plant. After 10 years, in 1950 the statue was unearthed. Since Juliusz Słowacki Square was already occupied by a monument of gratitude to the Red Army, the monument to Władysław Orkan was erected in the Market Square. In 2012, during the revitalization of the Market Square, the monument was moved back to Juliusz Słowacki Square - its original, pre-war place.

In 2011–2012, the Market Square was rebuilt. The pavement was covered with granite slabs, 80 trees and shrubs were removed. The Town Hall building and the chapel of St. John Cantius were illuminated. In place of the stone pool of a former fountain (which served as a lawn), a new one has been built. The new fountain is not surrounded by a wall as before, but level with the slab surface and illuminated. The number of parking spaces was decreased. Parking lots were removed from the center of the square, and instead parking bays were built at the northern and southern frontages. Outdoor dining appeared on the Market Square. The circular traffic around the square remained unchanged.

In 2020, the medieval urban layout of Nowy Targ, including the Market Square, was entered by the Provincial Conservator of Monuments into the register of immovable monuments in the Małopolska Province.

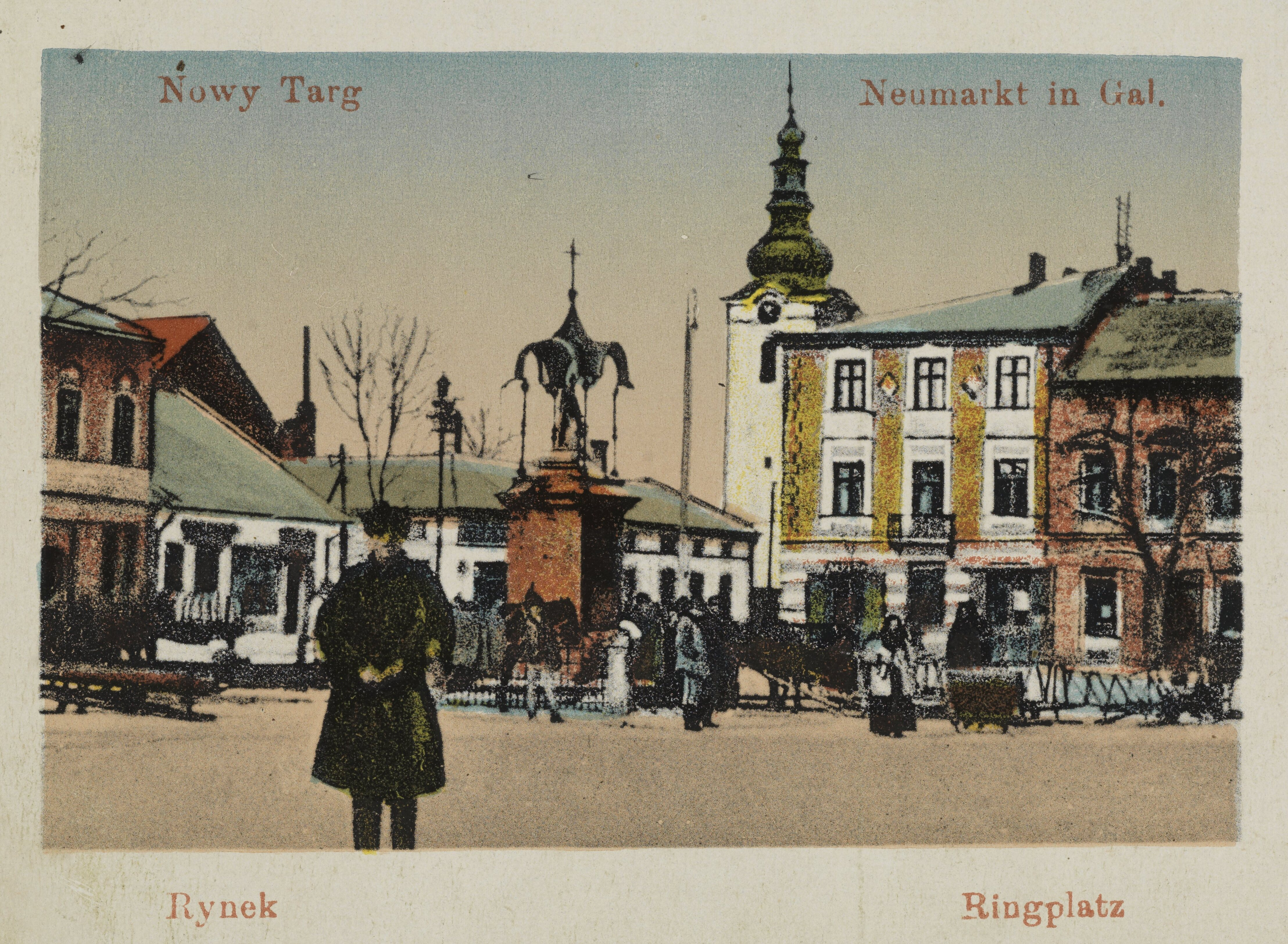
The Market Square between 1914 and 1918

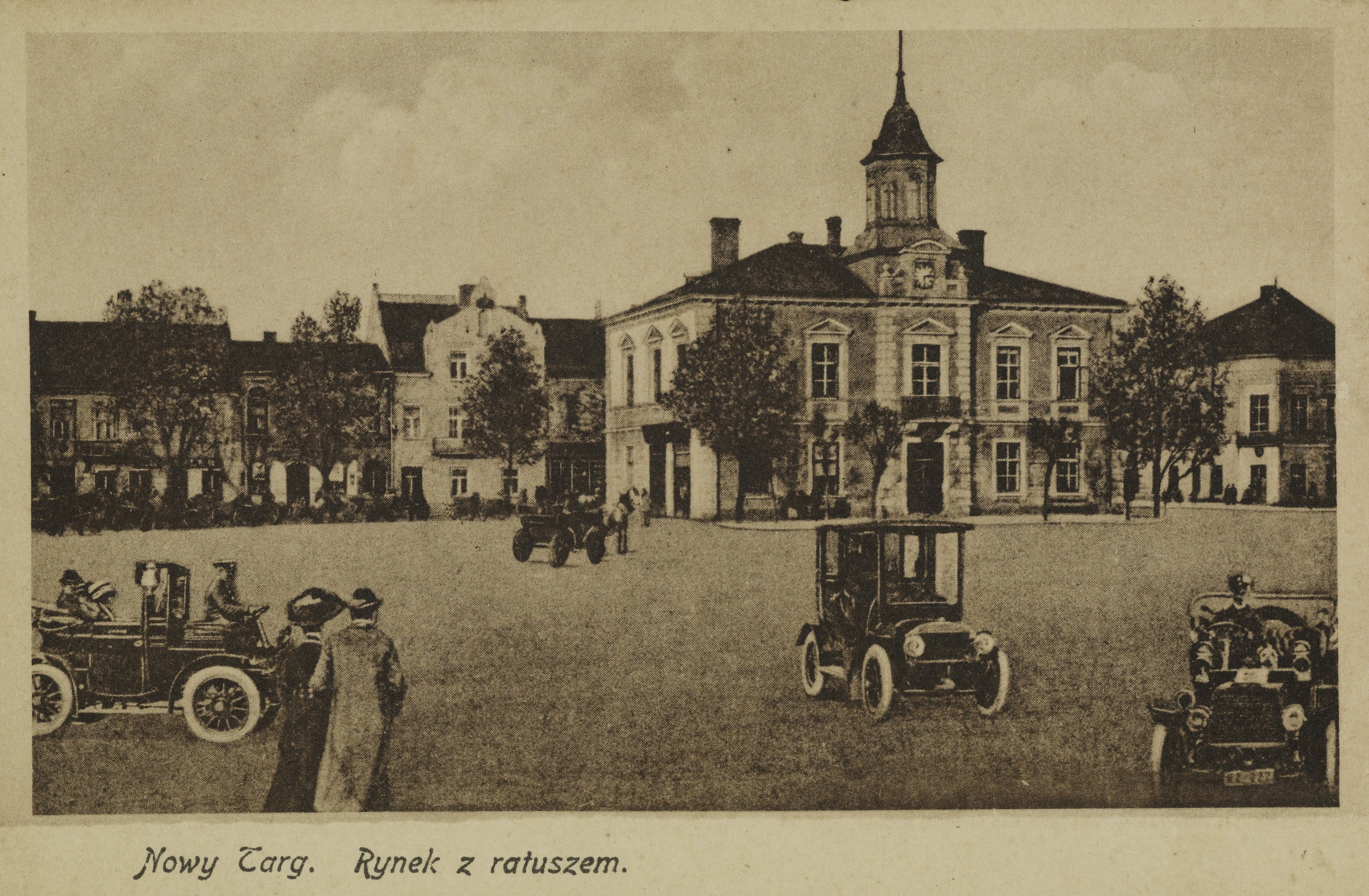
The Market Square in 1918

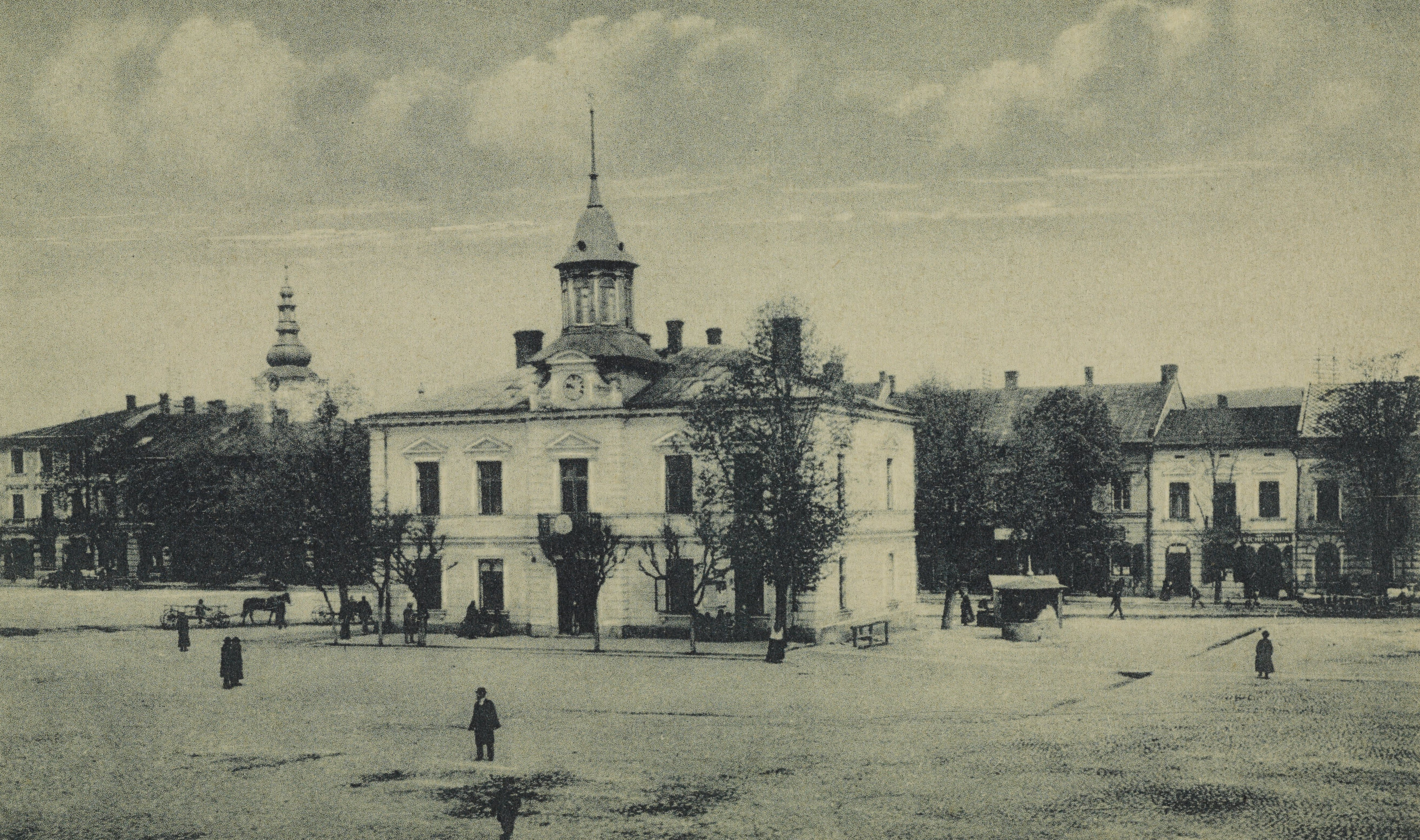
The Market Square between 1923 and 1926

== Events ==
The Market Square is the cultural and social center of Nowy Targ. In 2013, the town authorities announced the program of events on the Market Square:

- March - the last month of operation of the town ice rink
- April - no plans
- May - Juwenalia (students' holidays), Jan Kanty Pawluśkiewicz benefit concert, regional products and culture festival
- June - no plans
- July - Małopolska Food Festival and open-air cinema
- August - open-air cinema, Tour de Pologne, country music picnic and a several-day Podhale Fair
- September - "Bread Festival"
- October - Pope John Paul II Day organized by parishes
- November - Independence Day
- December - Christmas market, open-air ice rink, New Year's Eve
- January and February - ice rink
