= Nowy Targ Airport =

Nowy Targ Airfield Lotnisko Nowy Targ
- IATA: QWS; ICAO: EPNT

Summary
- Airport type: Public
- Operator: Aeroklub Nowy Targ
- Serves: Nowy Targ, Zakopane
- Location: Nowy Targ
- Elevation AMSL: 627 m / 2,060 ft
- Coordinates: 49°27′45″N 20°03′01″E
- Interactive map of Nowy Targ Airfield

Runways
Direction	Length		Surface
Direction	m	ft	Surface
12/30	1,680	5,512	grass

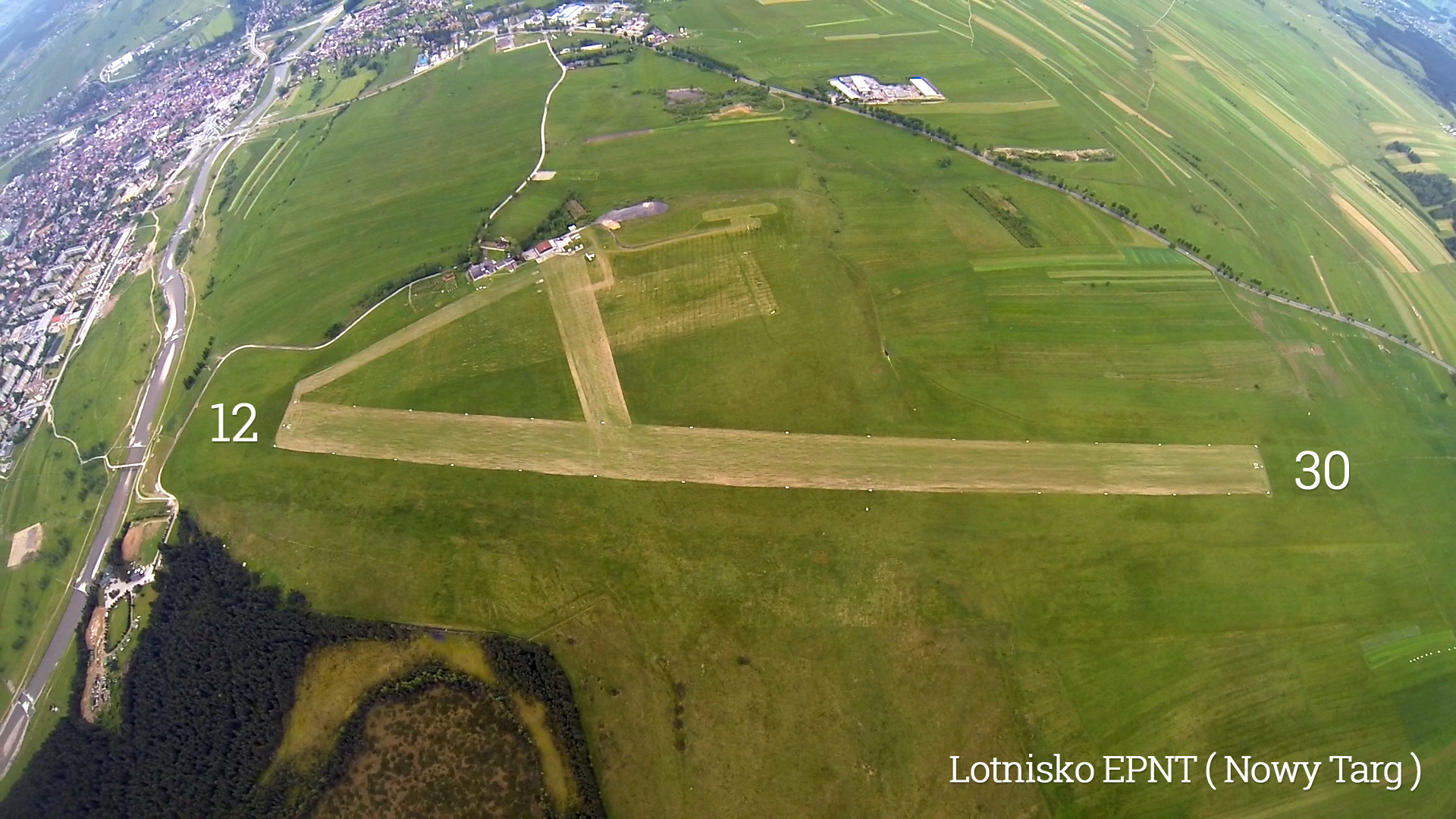
Aerial image of Nowy Targ Airport runway

Nowy Targ Airport is a grass airfield serving Nowy Targ, Podhale, Poland, opened in 1930. In 1962 LOT Polish Airlines commenced a scheduled service between Nowy Targ and Warsaw, but this was terminated after 10 flights when it was decided to discontinue the use of grass airfields.
