= Coat of arms of Nowy Targ =

The coat of arms of Nowy Targ, a town in southern Poland, depicts the martyr Saint Catherine of Alexandria dressed in white with a red cape with white stars, wearing a gold crown. She holds a sword at her side and a palm leaf. She stands in front of a gold Catherine wheel. Her head is encircled by a halo, indicating her sainthood.

The present version of the arms was adopted by the town council of Nowy Targ in 1991, but the town has used the image of Saint Catherine for its seal since the 15th century.
