= University of Applied Sciences in Nowy Targ =

State vocational university in Nowy Targ, Poland

Coordinates: 49.48996°N 20.04640°E

- Akademia Nauk Stosowanych w Nowym Targu
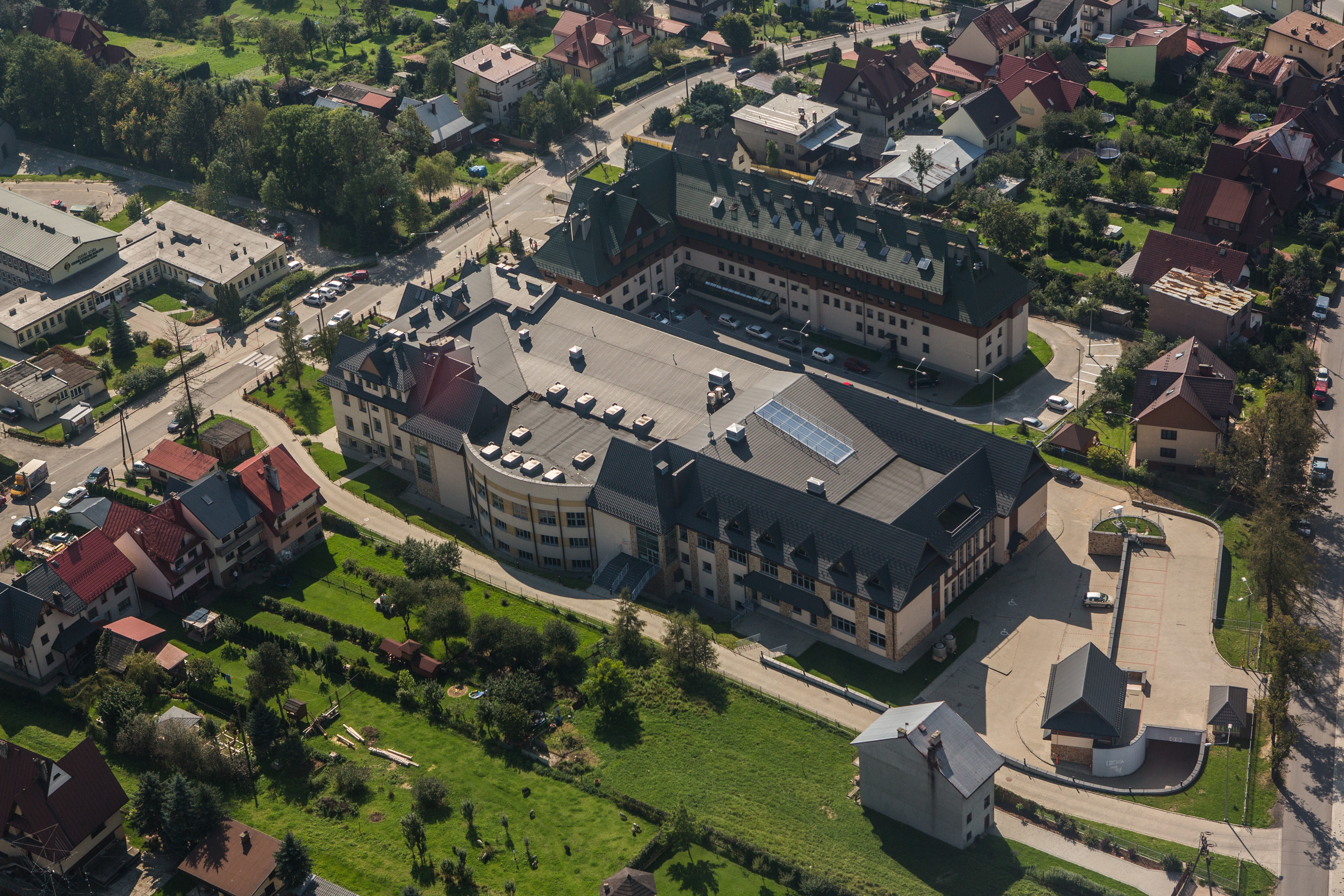
- A bird's eye view of the university complex
- Former names: Podhale State Higher Vocational School in Nowy Targ (2001–2019); Podhale State Vocational University in Nowy Targ (2019–2023)
- Type: Public vocational
- Established: 2001; 25 years ago
- Rector: dr Maria Zięba (acting)
- Students: around 2000
- Location: Nowy Targ, Poland
- Campus: Urban/college town
- Website: https://ans-nt.edu.pl

University of Applied Sciences in Nowy Targ (Polish: Akademia Nauk Stosowanych w Nowym Targu (ANS)) is a public vocational university in Nowy Targ, Poland. Over 90% of students at ANS come from Podhale, Spiš and Orava.

ANS is the highest situated university in Poland (615 m above sea level).

== History ==
Podhale State Higher Vocational School in Nowy Targ (Polish: Podhalańska Państwowa Wyższa Szkoła Zawodowa w Nowym Targu (PPWSZ)) was founded in 2001, following the initiative of the Lesser Poland voivodeship's authorities. From October 2019, the university operated under a new name as the Podhale State Vocational University in Nowy Targ (Polish: Podhalańska Państwowa Uczelnia Zawodowa w Nowym Targu (PPUZ)). On April 18, 2023, Przemysław Czarnek, Minister of Science and Higher Education, had signed a regulation under which the Nowy Targ university was renamed the University of Applied Sciences in Nowy Targ from October 1 of the same year.

=== Allegations of religious profanation ===
At 2019 Juwenalia, some students of PPWSZ dressed up as the Pope and nuns in short skirts. Councilors of the Nowy Targ County described the students' behavior as a desecration of religious symbols and an insult to religious feelings. The starosta announced that the county would withdraw from financing juwenalia in the following years, and the university took disciplinary action against students who dressed inappropriately.

=== Plagiarism scandal ===
Rector Stanisław Gulak was dismissed from his post on March 17, 2020, by the decision of the Minister of Science and Higher Education, Jarosław Gowin. The rector was charged with plagiarism. A disciplinary prosecutor found as many as 74 borrowed fragments from 8 other publications in the clergyman's habilitation thesis. Rector Stanisław Gulak, however, assured of his innocence, and the Council of the PPUZ in Nowy Targ issued an opinion on the reliability of his scientific achievements. Currently, the case of plagiarism is being clarified by the prosecutor's office, and an inspection has been ordered in the PPUZ in Nowy Targ.

== University authorities ==
- Rector – dr Maria Zięba (acting)
- Vice-rector for student affairs and education – dr Maria Zięba
- Vice-rector for science and projects – dr Krzysztof Waśkowski
- Rector's Plenipotentiary for Cooperation and Development – dr Bianka Godlewska-Dzioboń
- Chancellor – mgr Andrzej Sasuła
- Quaestor – mgr Małgorzata Maciaś
- Director of the Medical Institute – dr hab. Zbigniew Doniec, prof. PPUZ
- Director of the Institute of Health – dr Piotr Kurzeja
- Director of the Technical Institute – mgr inż. arch. Agata Bentkowska
- Director of the Humanities and Social Institute – dr Małgorzata Wesołowska
- Director of the Podhale Center of Economic Sciences – dr Paweł Zamora

Rectors

- prof. dr hab. Stanisław Hodorowicz (from 2001 to 2012);
- dr hab. Iwon Grys (from 2012 to 2016);
- ks. płk (r) dr hab. Stanisław Gulak (from September 2016 to March 2020)
- dr hab. Robert Włodarczyk, prof. PPUZ (from June 2020 to December 2021)

== Fields of study ==
ANS offers education in ten fields of study at two levels: first-cycle (bachelor's and engineering studies) and second-cycle (master's studies).

- Architecture – first-cycle and second-cycle
- National security – first-cycle
- Dietetics – first-cycle
- Finance and accounting – first-cycle
- Accounting and economic analytics – second-cycle
- English Philology – first-cycle and second-cycle
- Physiotherapy – long-cycle master's studies and second-cycle
- Cosmetology – first-cycle and second-cycle
- Spatial management – first-cycle
- Nursing – first-cycle and second-cycle
- Social work – first-cycle
- Medical rescue – first-cycle
- Sports – first-cycle
- Tourism and Recreation – first-cycle and second-cycle

The university also offers postgraduate studies:

- Functionality and aesthetics of public space
- Personal trainer with English
- Tourism business management with English
- Information management in a contemporary library

== Student organizations ==
- Klub Uczelniany AZS PPUZ
- Uczelniany Klub Sportowy Recreo
- Klub Uczelniany Sportów Zimowych „Kusz”
- Uczelniany Zespół Góralski „Młode Podhale”
- Studenckie Radio Fala Podhala

== Science clubs ==
- Koło Naukowe Pielęgniarstwa Psychiatrycznego
- Koło Naukowe „Internurse”
- Koło Naukowe „Fizjomaster”
- Koło Naukowe „Akson”
- Koło Naukowe „Kalliope”
- Koło Naukowe „Ratownik”
- Koło Naukowe „Kosmetoscience”
- Koło Naukowe „Ad Quadratum”
- Koło Naukowe „Modulor”
- Koło Naukowe Ekonomii i Rachunkowości „Skner”
- Studenckie Koło Naukowe Języka Angielskiego
- Podhalańskie Koło Naukowe Turystyki
- Działalność w Studenckim Radio Fala Podhala
- Koło Naukowe Studentów Pracy Socjalnej

== EU projects ==
- Project "Improving the quality of higher education in nursing at PPUZ in Nowy Targ, which will translate into increased interest in nursing studies and thus contribute to the education of an additional number of graduates"
- Project "Development and implementation of the development program of the field of nursing PPUZ in Nowy Targ and the creation of a monoprofile medical simulation center"
- Project "Dual studies in the field of finance and accounting - practical profile at the Podhale Center of Economic Sciences"
- Project "Podhale Digital Library (PBC)"
