= Sucha Beskidzka railway station =

Railway station in Lesser Poland, Poland

Sucha Beskidzka
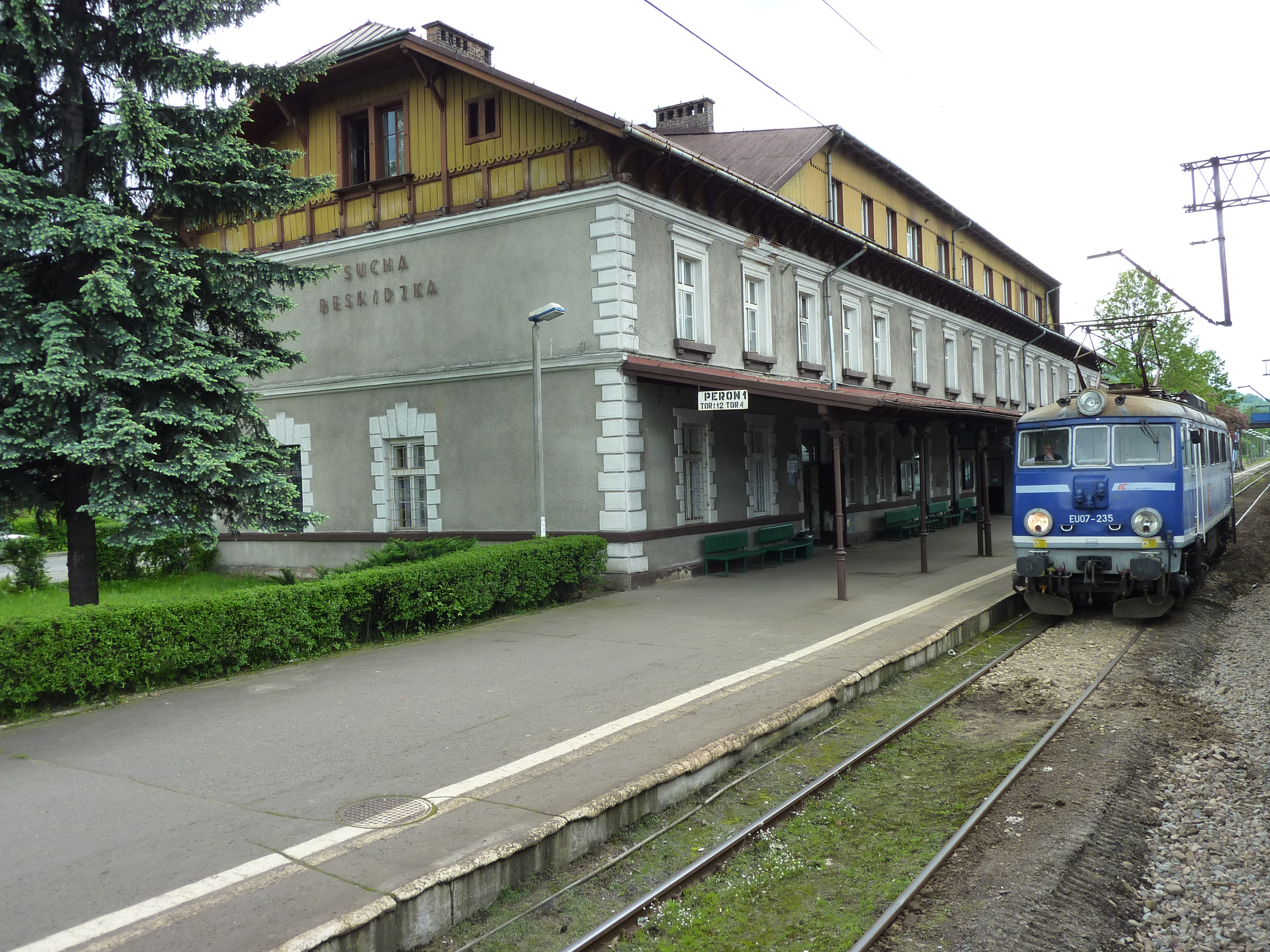

General information
- Location: Sucha Beskidzka, Lesser Poland; Poland
- Coordinates: 49.7403857°N 19.5761341°E
- Owner: Polskie Koleje Państwowe S.A.
- Line: 97: Skawina – Żywiec; 98: Sucha Beskidzka – Chabówka
- Platforms: 2
- Tracks: 4

Construction
- Structure type: Building: Yes

History
- Opened: 1884
Location

Sucha Beskidzka railway station is a railway station in Sucha Beskidzka (Lesser Poland), Poland. As of 2022, it is served by Silesian Railways (Silesian Voivodeship Railways), Polregio, and PKP Intercity (EIP, InterCity, and TLK services). This station is about 2 km West of a newly built (opened in 2017) station, Sucha Beskidzka Zamek, which serves most InterCity and TLK services while this station serves regional services, and one InterCity service connecting Bydgoszcz to Zakopane.

== Train services ==
The station is served by the following services:

- Intercity services (IC) Poznań Główny — Leszno — Wrocław Główny — Opole — Rybnik — Bielsko-Biała Główna — Zakopane
- Regional services (PR) K5 Kraków Główny — Skawina – Sucha Beskidzka — Chabówka — Nowy Targ — Zakopane
- Regional services (PR) K51 Kraków Główny – Skawina – Sucha Beskidzka – Żywiec
- Regional services (KŚ) S51 Częstochowa – Katowice – Bielsko-Biała Główna — Żywiec – Sucha Beskidzka — Nowy Targ — Zakopane

Preceding station	PKP Intercity	Following station
Jeleśnia towards Bydgoszcz Główna	IC	Maków Podhalański towards Zakopane
Preceding station	Polregio	Following station
Zembrzyce towards Kraków Główny	K5	Maków Podhalański towards Chabówka or Zakopane
Zembrzyce towards Kraków Główny	K51	Stryszawa towards Żywiec
Preceding station	KŚ	Following station
Lachowice Centrum towards Katowice	S51	Maków Podhalański towards Zakopane
