= Zakopane railway station =

Railway station in Lesser Poland, Poland

Zakopane
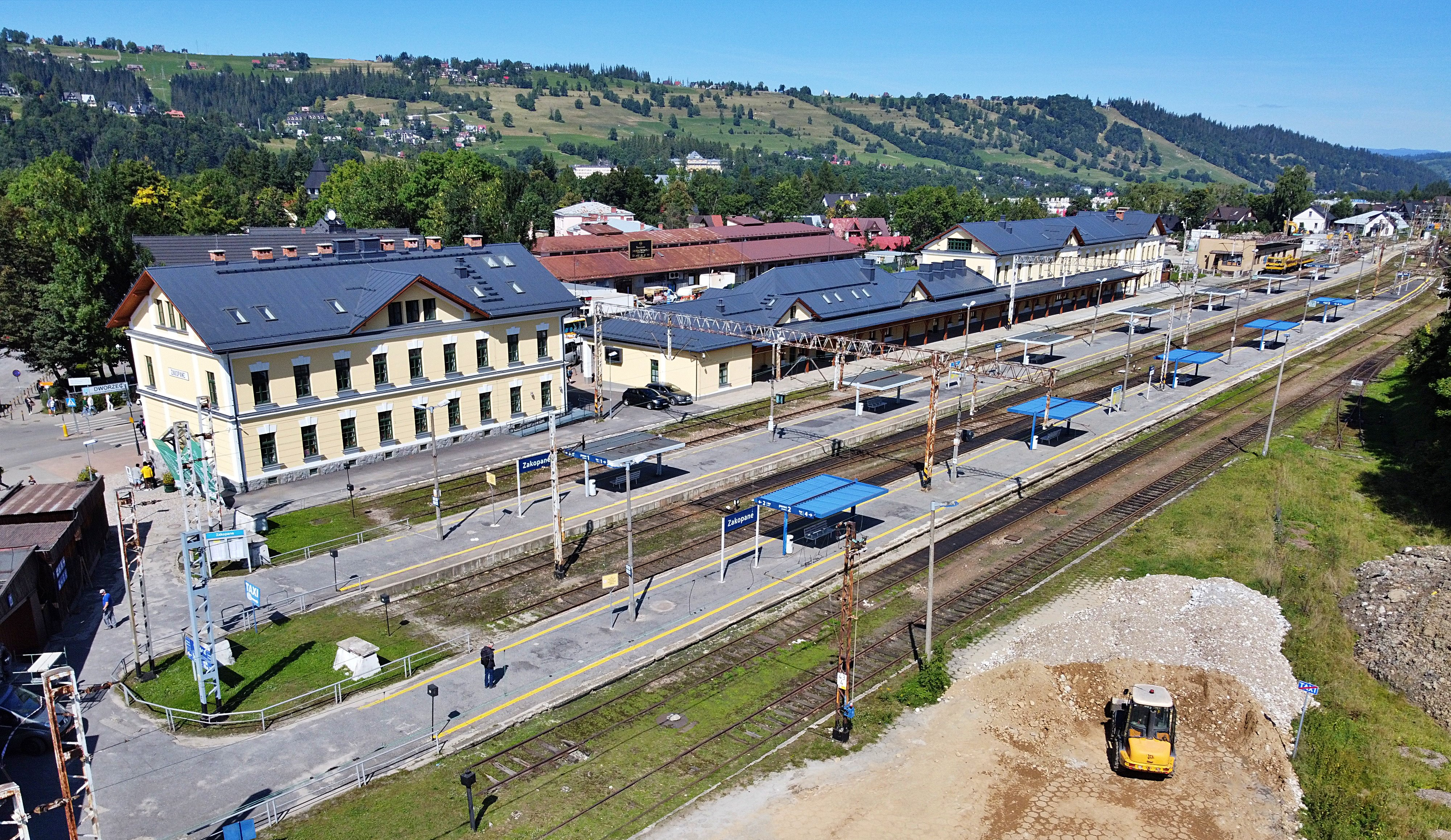
- Station building and platforms in September 2021.

General information
- Location: Zakopane, Lesser Poland; Poland
- Coordinates: 49.3006725°N 19.960166°E
- Owner: Polskie Koleje Państwowe S.A.
- Line: 99 Chabówka – Zakopane
- Platforms: 3
- Tracks: 5

Construction
- Structure type: Building: Yes

History
- Opened: 1899
- Rebuilt: 1939, 2023
- Electrified: 1975
Location

Zakopane railway station is a railway station in Zakopane (Lesser Poland), Poland and the terminus of PKP rail line 99. The station was opened in 1899 and electrified in 1975. It is also the highest situated staffed railway station in Poland at 835 metres above sea level. As of 2023, it is served by Silesian Railways (Silesian Voivodeship Railways), Polregio, and PKP Intercity (EIC, InterCity, and TLK services).

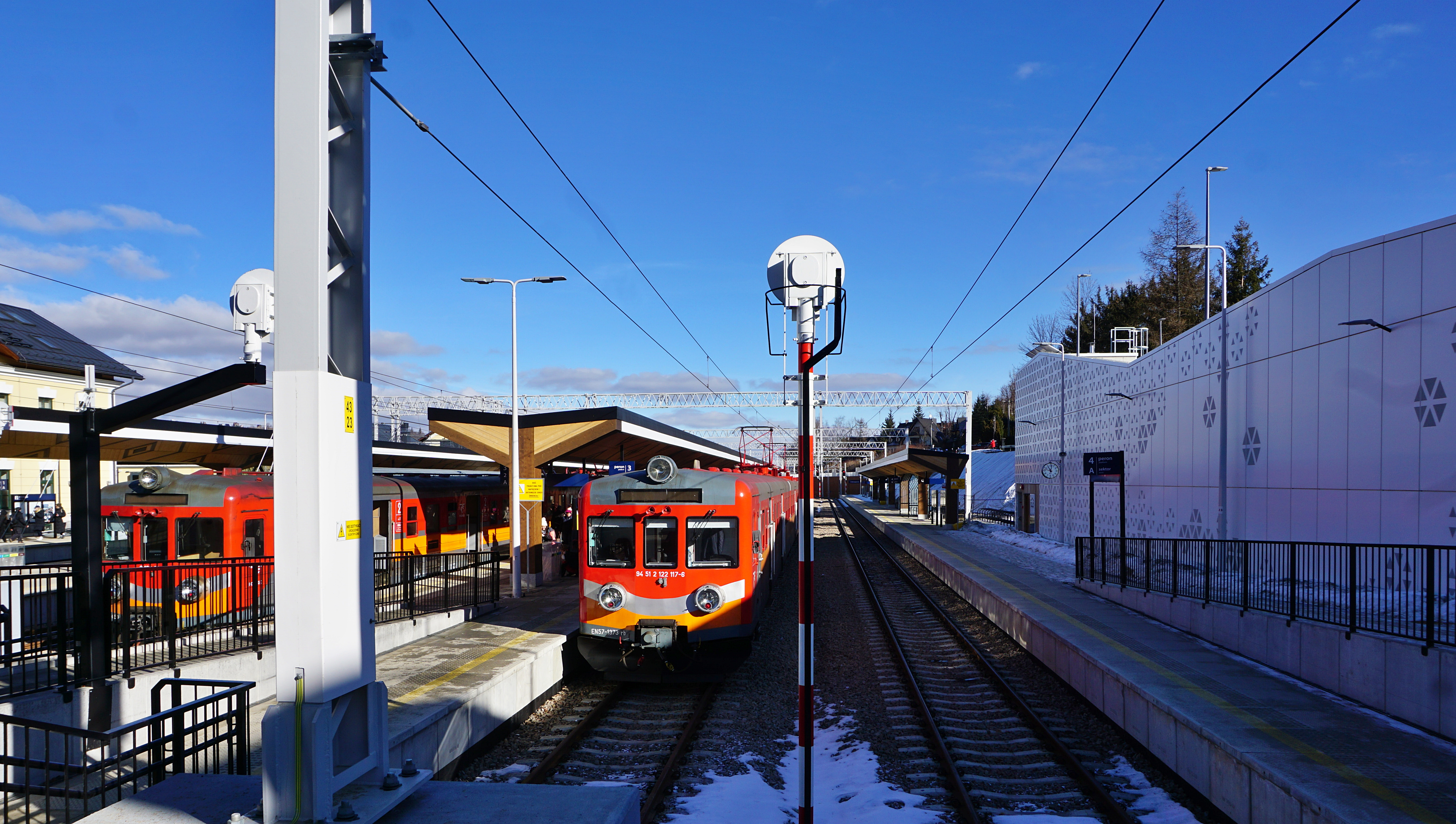
View east from the Armia Krajowa Roundabout. A EN57 train is visible in the foreground

== Train services ==
The station is served by the following services:

- Express Intercity services (EIC) Warsaw - Kraków - Zakopane
- Intercity services (IC) Warsaw - Kraków - Zakopane
- Intercity services (IC) Gdynia - Gdańsk - Bydgoszcz - Łódź - Czestochowa — Krakow — Zakopane
- Intercity services (IC) Bydgoszcz - Poznań - Leszno - Wrocław - Opole - Rybnik - Bielsko-Biała - Zakopane
- Intercity services (IC) Szczecin - Białogard - Szczecinek - Piła - Poznań - Ostrów Wielkopolski - Katowice - Zakopane
- Intercity services (TLK) Gdynia Główna — Zakopane
- Regional services (PR) K5 Kraków Główny — Skawina — Sucha Beskidzka — Chabówka — Nowy Targ — Zakopane
- Regional services (KŚ) S51 Katowice - Pszczyna - Bielsko-Biała Gł - Żywiec - Nowy Targ - Zakopane

K5 services operating between Chabówka or Nowy Targ and Zakopane only are branded as Podhalańska Kolej Regionalna (Podhale Regional Railway).

Preceding station	PKP Intercity	Following station
Nowy Targ towards Warszawa Wschodnia	EIC	Terminus
Poronin towards Warszawa Wschodnia	IC	Terminus
Poronin towards Gdynia Główna	IC	Terminus
Poronin towards Bydgoszcz Główna	IC	Terminus
Poronin towards Szczecin Główny	IC	Terminus
Poronin towards Gdynia Główna	TLK	Terminus
Preceding station	Polregio	Following station
Poronin Misiagi towards Kraków Główny, Sucha Beskidzka, Chabówka or Nowy Targ	K5	Terminus
Preceding station	KŚ	Following station
Poronin towards Częstochowa	S51	Terminus
