= Chabówka railway station =

Railway station in Lesser Poland, Poland

Chabówka
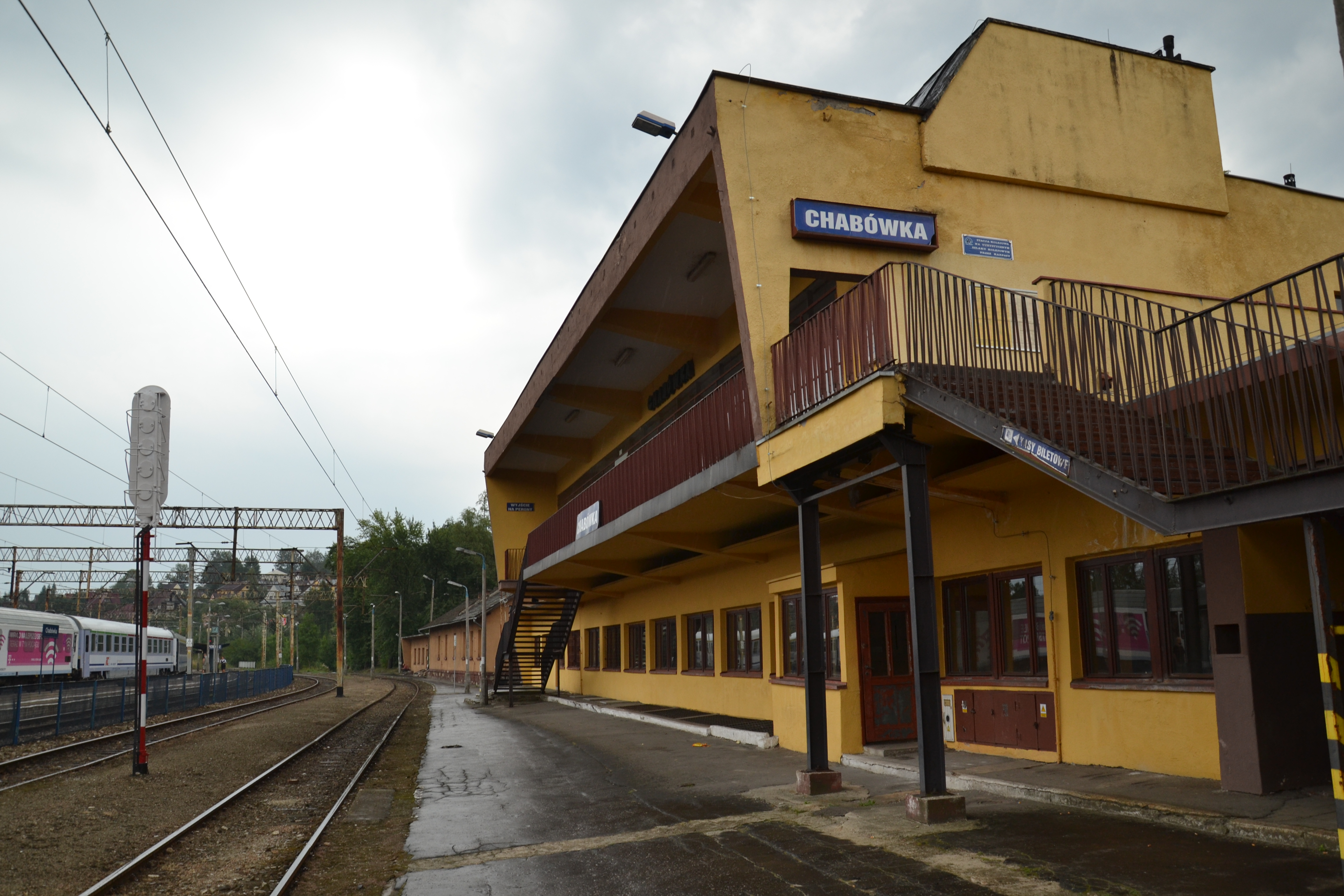

General information
- Location: Chabówka, Lesser Poland; Poland
- Coordinates: 49.5968103°N 19.934664°E
- Owner: Polskie Koleje Państwowe S.A.
- Line: 98: Sucha Beskidzka – Chabówka; 99: Chabówka – Zakopane; 104: Chabówka – Nowy Sącz
- Platforms: 2
- Tracks: 3

Construction
- Structure type: Building: Yes

History
- Opened: 1884
Location

Chabówka railway station is a railway station in Chabówka (Lesser Poland), Poland. As of 2025, it is served by Polregio only.

== Train services ==
The station is served by the following services:

- Regional services (PR) K5 Kraków Główny — Skawina — Sucha Beskidzka — Chabówka — Nowy Targ — Zakopane
- Regional services (PR) K5 branded as Podhalańska Kolej Regionalna Chabówka – Rabka-Zdrój – Chabówka – Nowy Targ – Zakopane

PKP InterCity and Koleje Śląskie served this station until the opening of line 633, which allows trains to go from line 98 onto line 99 and vice versa without changing direction in Chabówka.

K5 services operating between Chabówka or Nowy Targ and Zakopane only are branded as Podhalańska Kolej Regionalna (Podhale Regional Railway).

Preceding station	Polregio	Following station
Skawa Środkowa towards Kraków Główny or Sucha Beskidzka	K5	Chabówka Stadion towards Zakopane
Terminus	K5	Rabka-Zdrój towards Zakopane

== Bibliography ==
- Station article at koleo.pl
