= Nowy Targ =

Nowy Targ Nowy Torg
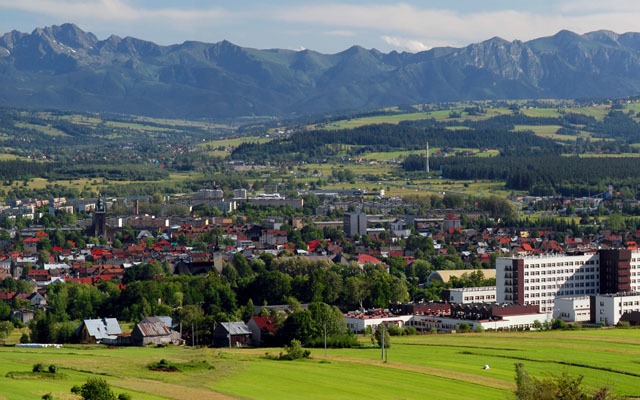
- Center of Nowy Targ

- Coat of arms

- Location within Poland
- Coordinates: 49°28′N 20°1′E
- Country: Poland
- Voivodeship: Lesser Poland
- County: Nowy Targ
- Gmina: Nowy Targ (urban gmina)
- Established: 13th century
- Town rights: 1346

Government
  - Mayor: Grzegorz Watycha

Area
  - Total: 51.07 km^{2} (19.72 sq mi)
- Highest elevation: 1,138 m (3,734 ft)
- Lowest elevation: 585 m (1,919 ft)

Population (2006)
  - Total: 33,493
  - Density: 655.8/km^{2} (1,699/sq mi)
- Time zone: UTC+1 (CET)
  - Summer (DST): UTC+2 (CEST)
- Postal code: 34-400 to 34-403
- Area code: +48 182
- Car plates: KNT
- Website: http://www.nowytarg.pl

Nowy Targ [ˈnɔvɨ ˈtark] (Officially: Royal Free city of Nowy Targ, Yiddish: Naymark, Hungarian: Újvásár, Goral dialect: Nowy Torg [ˈnuɔvɨ 'tɔrg]) is a town in southern Poland, in the Lesser Poland Voivodeship. It is located in the Orava-Nowy Targ Basin at the foot of the Gorce Mountains, at the confluence of the Czarny Dunajec and the Biały Dunajec. It is the seat of the Nowy Targ County and the rural Gmina Nowy Targ, as well as the Tatra Euroregion.

With 33,293 inhabitants, Nowy Targ is the largest town and the historic capital of Podhale, as well as its main commercial, communication and industrial center.

The town has the Podhale State Vocational University and the highest located airport in Poland.

Established before 1233, Nowy Targ received city rights on 22 June 1346 from King Casimir the Great. The historic architectural and urban complex of the town with a medieval market square has been preserved to this day.

== Toponymy ==
In 1233, a settlement called in Polish: Stare Cło, lit. 'Old Toll' (Latin: Antiquum Theoloneum) or Polish: Długie Pole, lit. 'Long Field' is mentioned in the vicinity of the present town. Later, a settlement of Novum Forum, Neoforum was established in the new place. The name of the town was spelled in Polish: Nowy Targ, lit. 'New Market' or Nowytarg.

The town's full official name is Królewskie Wolne Miasto Nowy Targ, which can be translated as 'Royal Free Town Nowy Targ'. Nowy Targ was a royal town of the Crown of the Kingdom of Poland and was granted staple right in 1638. In nearby Slovakia, the town is known as Nový Trh.

Nowy Targ is commonly called in the Goral dialect of Polish: Miasto, lit. 'the Town'. During Christianization, the Germanic settlers called the town the German name Neumarkt, and during the Austrian partition it was called Naj-Mark (Yiddish: נײַ־מאַרק) by local Jews. During the German occupation of Poland, the authorities of the General Government introduced the official name of Neumarkt am Dohnst.

== Timeline of town history ==
- 1308 - Cistercians receive a land grant to form new settlements in the mountain region. A border settlement called Stare Cło (German: Altzoll, English: Old Customs Post) is founded soon thereafter.
- 1346 - Nowy Targ founded by King Casimir the Great, based on the Stare Cło settlement, and granted significant internal autonomy based on Magdeburg law.
- 1487 - King Casimir IV Jagiellon grants the rights to two annual festivals, and a weekly market fair on Thursdays. (The weekly open-air market continues to this day, now on Thursday and Saturday mornings.)
- 1533 - Nowy Targ obtains a statute requiring merchants to pass through the city when crossing the border.
- 1601 - Great fire destroys the parochial church and city records.
- 1656 - Swedish troops sack the town during the Deluge.
- 1670 - The Battle of Nowy Targ occurs ending the Peasant rebellion in Podhale of Gorals
- 1710 - Another fire consumes 41 houses and the church.
- 1770 - Nowy Targ annexed by Austria (see: Partitions of Poland).
- 1886 - City Hall opens.
- 1914 - Vladimir Ilyich Lenin is arrested as a possible spy in southern Poland by Austrian authorities; he is jailed in Nowy Targ for approximately 12 days.
- 1918 - The region rejoins the restored Poland after World War I.
- 1933 - Polish president Ignacy Mościcki visits.
- 1939 - German forces invade on 1 September, at approx. 16:30.
- 1941 - Resistance movement called the Tatra Confederation formed in Nowy Targ.
- 1942 - Jewish ghetto liquidated by Nazis on 30 August.
- 1945 - The Red Army forces out German occupants on 29 January. Several Jewish Holocaust survivors who returned home, to the town, are murdered in a pogrom by locals (some of whom were associated with the right-wing nationalist National Armed Forces (NSZ) and the rest flee.
- 1966 - Born Wojciech Wiercioch, Polish writer.
- 1979 - Pope John Paul II visits Nowy Targ on 8 June, during his first pilgrimage to Poland.

== Geography ==
Nowy Targ is located in the heart of Podhale (one of the Goral Lands) at the altitude of 585–850 m above sea level (AMSL); latitude 49°28' N, longitude 20°01' E.

=== Climate ===
Due to its altitude, Nowy Targ is one of the coldest cities in Poland together with Suwałki and Zakopane. Winter usually lasts from late November to early April and between 90 and 110 days a year there is a snow cover. Air frost has been measured in every month of the year except for July. Summers are mild with occasional thunderstorms and high temperatures between 17 and 25 degrees Celsius. Hot days (over 30 °C (86 °F)) are rare, only occurring twice annually on average. Precipitation is heavy for Polish standards, varying between 900 millimeters (35 in) at the airport and 1,100 millimeters (43 in) in Kowaniec to around 1,350 millimeters (53 in) on Bukowina Miejska, the highest part of the city. The growing season equally varies between on average 150 days on Bukowina Miejska to around 200 days in the lower parts of the city. Nowy Targ is in AHS Heat Zone 1 and USDA Hardiness Zone 5b-6a depending on the location.

According to the Köppen climate classification, Nowy Targ straddles the border of the Warm Summer Continental (Dfb) and Subarctic (Dfc) climates, with most of the city falling in the Dfb group. The Dfc climate is only found above 800 meters (2,600 ft)of elevation within Nowy Targ.

Climate data for Nowy Targ - Kowaniec, Poland (640 m)
Month	Jan	Feb	Mar	Apr	May	Jun	Jul	Aug	Sep	Oct	Nov	Dec	Year
Record high °C (°F)	15.5 (59.9)	17.3 (63.1)	20.8 (69.4)	26.5 (79.7)	30.1 (86.2)	32.8 (91.0)	33.3 (91.9)	34.0 (93.2)	29.8 (85.6)	25.7 (78.3)	22.3 (72.1)	14.2 (57.6)	34.0 (93.2)
Mean daily maximum °C (°F)	−2.0 (28.4)	−1.3 (29.7)	4.9 (40.8)	11.8 (53.2)	17.1 (62.8)	20.1 (68.2)	20.9 (69.6)	20.5 (68.9)	18.0 (64.4)	11.6 (52.9)	3.8 (38.8)	−0.1 (31.8)	10.4 (50.7)
Daily mean °C (°F)	−5.3 (22.5)	−4.8 (23.4)	−0.4 (31.3)	5.4 (41.7)	11.3 (52.3)	13.8 (56.8)	14.7 (58.5)	14.3 (57.7)	10.7 (51.3)	5.6 (42.1)	0.0 (32.0)	−3.5 (25.7)	5.1 (41.2)
Mean daily minimum °C (°F)	−9.0 (15.8)	−8.7 (16.3)	−6.0 (21.2)	−1.2 (29.8)	5.5 (41.9)	7.8 (46.0)	9.0 (48.2)	7.9 (46.2)	4.1 (39.4)	0.2 (32.4)	−3.5 (25.7)	−6.7 (19.9)	−0.1 (31.8)
Record low °C (°F)	−37.4 (−35.3)	−34.1 (−29.4)	−25.6 (−14.1)	−13.5 (7.7)	−6.1 (21.0)	−3.5 (25.7)	0.9 (33.6)	−2.2 (28.0)	−5.8 (21.6)	−14.1 (6.6)	−22.7 (−8.9)	−28.9 (−20.0)	−37.4 (−35.3)
Average precipitation mm (inches)	55 (2.2)	53 (2.1)	60 (2.4)	85 (3.3)	115 (4.5)	147 (5.8)	162 (6.4)	126 (5.0)	93 (3.7)	67 (2.6)	60 (2.4)	55 (2.2)	1,078 (42.4)
Mean monthly sunshine hours	68	85	112	134	175	167	159	156	125	118	81	58	1,438
Source: IMGW

== Culture ==
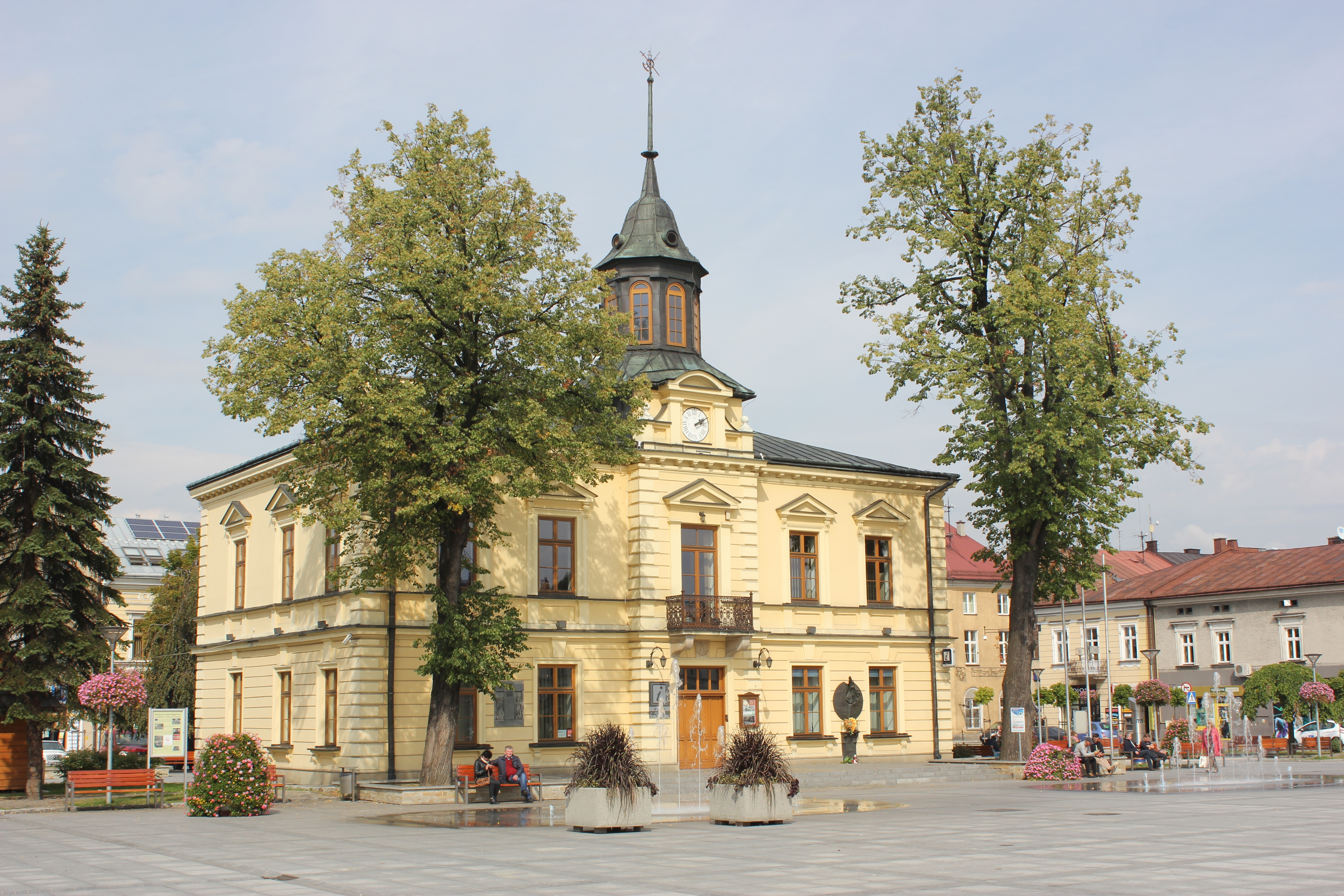
Town hall in Nowy Targ

- City Cultural Center (Miejski Ośrodek Kultury)
- Youth Cultural Center (Młodzieżowy Dom Kultury)
- The Jatka Gallery (Galeria Jatki)

=== Museums ===
- Museum of Podhale (Muzeum Podhalańskie PTTK)

=== Cinemas ===
- Cinema "Tatry"

== Architecture ==
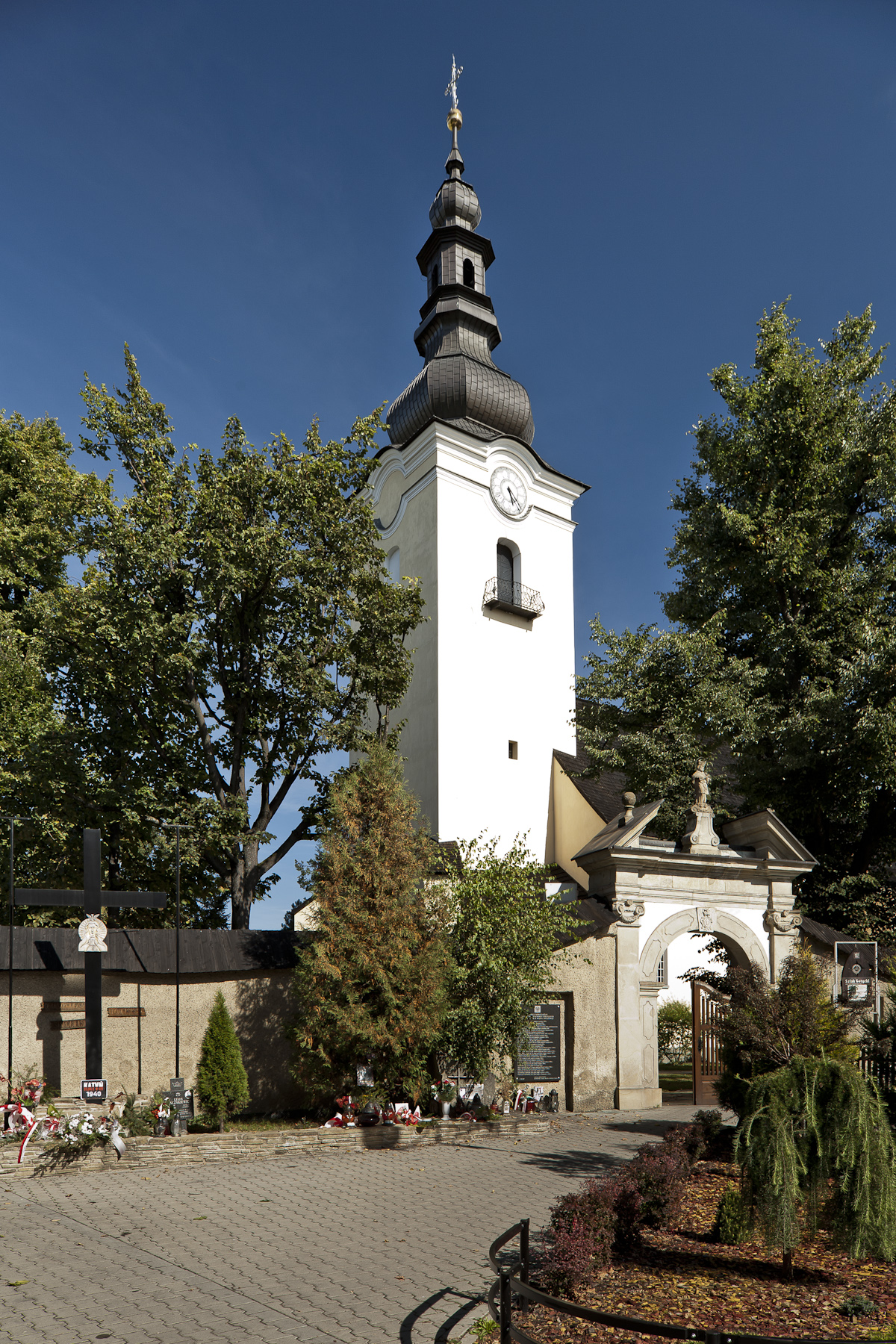
St. Catherine Church

=== St. Anna Church ===
Wooden church overseeing the city cemetery. Its origins date to the 15th century, although local legends describe it as founded in 1219.

Initially built in a gothic style, it was later repaired and rebuilt featuring, among others, a baroque altar piece and paintings, a rococo pulpit, and 18th-century organ and bell tower.

=== St. Catherine Church ===
Dedicated to St. Catherine of Alexandria, the church was built in 1346 by King Casimir the Great. It is the oldest existing church of the Podhale region.

The church has been damaged by numerous fires and military attacks, and subsequently rebuilt and renovated. The interior retains its baroque character, especially in the altar and side chapels, although numerous pieces are replicas of wooden originals lost to fire. A painting of St. Catherine from 1892 dominates the main altar.

== Education ==
- Podhalańska Państwowa Wyższa Szkoła Zawodowa in Nowy Targ

== Sport ==
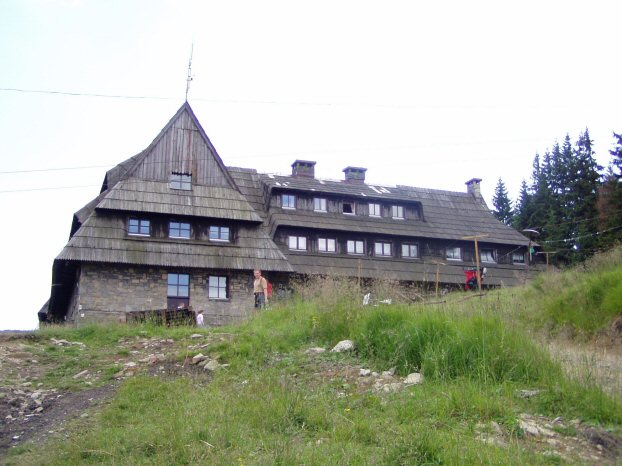
A mountain lodge on Turbacz Mountain

=== Ice hockey ===
- Podhale Nowy Targ

=== Floorball ===
- KS Szarotka Nowy Targ
- KS Górale Nowy Targ

== The Conservation of Nature ==
=== Nature reserves ===
- Bor na Czerwonem - a reserve in Nowy Targ where the protected Drosera rotundifolia, Mountain Pine and Black Grouse grow.

== International relations ==
=== Twin towns — Sister cities ===
Nowy Targ is twinned with:

- Radevormwald, Germany
- Kežmarok, Slovakia
- Évry, France
- Roverbella, Italy

== See also ==
- List of cities in Poland
- Gorals
- Podhale
