= Peasant rebellion in Podhale =

Peasant rebellion in Podhale may refer to:

- Peasant uprising in Podhale (1630–1633)
- Peasant rebellion in Podhale (1669–1670)
