= Aleksander Kostka Napierski =

Polish captain and leader of the Kostka Napierski uprising

Aleksander Leon Kostka-Napierski (1620–1651), Polish captain during the Thirty Years' War in Swedish service, participant of battle in Germany and organizer of the Kostka-Napierski Uprising. According to the historian prof. Paweł Wieczorkiewicz, Napierski was in service to Khmelnytsky. Professor of History Janusz Tazbir was of a similar opinion. However, other historians, such as Adam Kersten, cautiously connect Kostka-Napierski with the Swedish king, with Khmelnytsky, or with the court of Rákóczi.

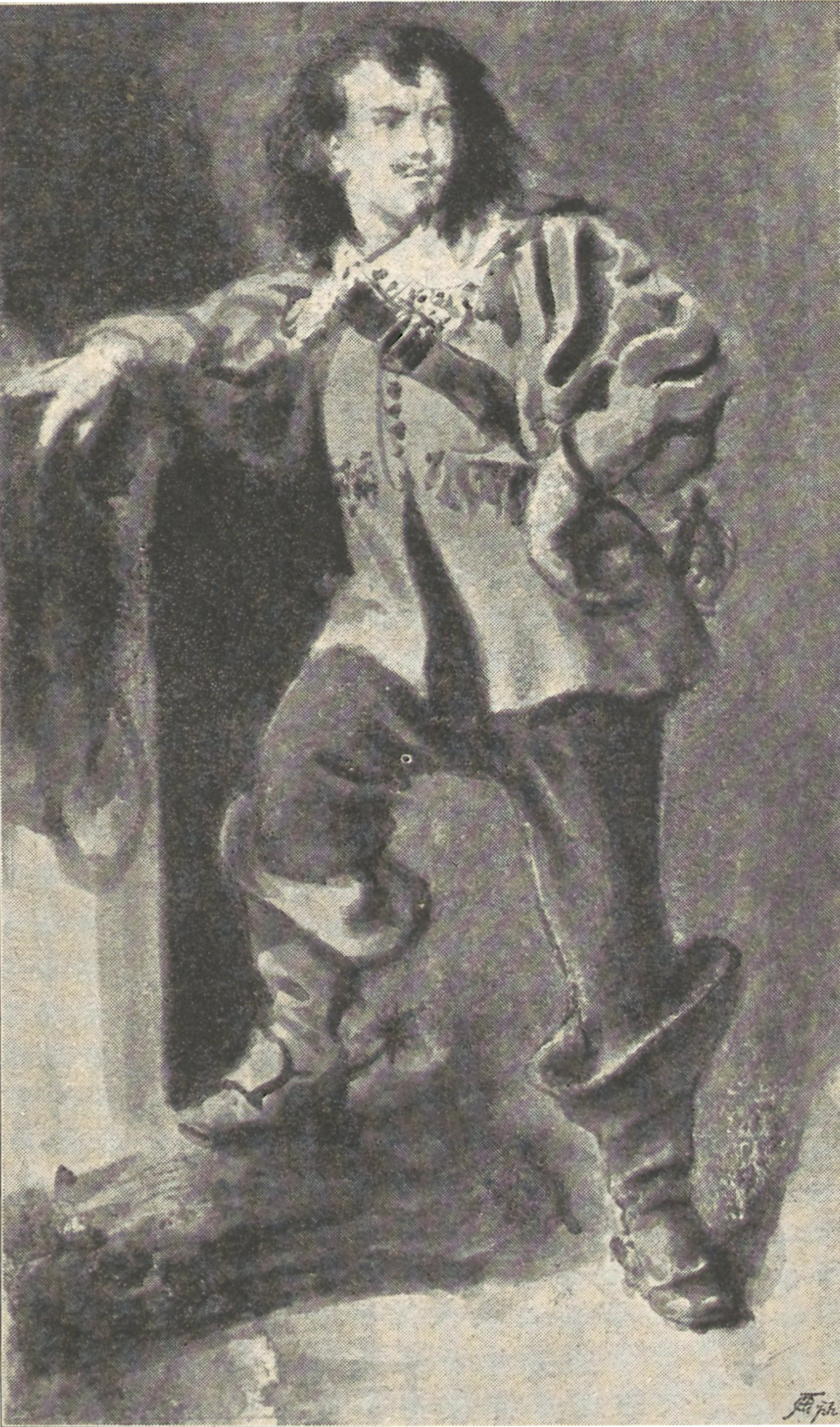
Aleksander Kostka-Napierski by Stanisław Dębicki

== Life and service ==
Kostka-Napierski served in the Swedish army as a mercenary during the Thirty Years' War. He returned to Poland after the death of Władysław IV Vasa. He contacted Bohdan Khmelnytsky, attempting to expand his revolt onto Tatra Polish lands and became the leader of the Tatra Mountains peasants (Górale).

In 1651, he organized recruitment to the rebel army in the Tatra Mountains in Podhale (with M. Radocki and S. Łętowski). Napierski called on every peasant in Poland to rise and overthrow the nobles from their position and power. His appeal did not meet with a great response.

In June 1651, they attacked and occupied the castle in Czorsztyn, without waiting for assistance from prince George II Rákóczi (who had allied himself with Khmelnytsky). After a short occupation, troops of the Bishop of Kraków Piotr Gembicki retook the castle. The revolt was stamped out, and Napierski and other leaders of the revolt were convicted and sentenced to capital punishment, and were impaled.

== Culture ==
Aleksander Kostka-Napierski was featured in the Polish poet Władysław Orkan's novel Kostka-Napierski. Powieść z XVII wieku and in director's Jan Batory's movie Podhale w ogniu. Streets are named after him in Szczecin, Łódź, Katowice, and Gdynia.

== See also ==
- Kostka-Napierski Uprising
