= Mikołaj Komorowski =

Polish nobleman

- Coat of arms
- Tenure: 1608–1624
- Born: 1578
- Died: October 2, 1633 (aged 54–55); Mikołaj near Wadowice
- Noble family: Komorowski (Korczak)
- Wife: Anna Myszkowska
- Heir: Krzysztof Komorowski
- Father: Krzysztof Komorowski
- Mother: Anna Płazówna

Mikołaj Komorowski (born 1578 – died 2 October 1633 near Wadowice) was a count of Liptov and Orava, and starosta of Barwałd Dolny from 1608 to 1624. He also held the positions of starosta of Rabsztyn, Oświęcim, and Nowy Targ. He was a controversial figure, remembered for being involved in numerous conflicts; his actions sparked a several-year-long peasant uprising in Podhale from 1625 to 1633.

== Biography ==
Mikołaj Komorowski was the eldest son of Krzysztof, castellan of Nowy Sącz, and his second wife, Anna Płazianka, the starosta of Lubaczów (d. 1591). He had two brothers, Aleksander and Piotr. On 26 November 1612, he married Anna, the daughter of Margrave Zygmunt Gonzaga Myszkowski. Komorowski died on 2 October 1633 at his estate in the village of Mikołaj near Wadowice. He had a son, Krzysztof, who became the starosta of Oświęcim, and two daughters, Zofia and Elżbieta.

He served as a delegate to the Sejmik of Zator and was a representative in the Sejms of 1613 and 1627.

Upon their father's death, Mikołaj and his brothers inherited the "Żywiec and Łodygowice estates" in Lesser Poland, which led to armed conflict among them. In 1598, Mikołaj received the starostwo of Oświęcim, which he passed to his brother Piotr in 1616. In 1602, he became the starosta of Barwałd, a position he handed over to his son Krzysztof in 1628. At some point, he also held the starostwo of Rabsztyn. In June 1624, he received the starostwo of Nowy Targ.

Adam Przyboś described him as greedy and extravagant, known for severe oppression of peasants and engaging in armed disputes with his neighbors, including György Thurzó, Stanisław Witowski, and Mikołaj Zebrzydowski. He was involved in various crimes, from counterfeiting money to violence and robberies, including robbing churches. After being sentenced by the tribunal for counterfeiting, he escaped from prison and ordered the murder of witnesses. Komorowski's disputes with Thurzó were also the subject of correspondence between Sigismund III and Rudolf II in 1598.

His mistreatment of peasants, particularly in the starostwo of Nowy Targ, contributed to a peasant uprising in Podhale (1625–1633). Contemporary sources, such as documents from peasant trials, portray Komorowski as provocatively dismissive of his subjects, imposing harsh measures on them. Przyboś noted that he forced village leaders to pay hiberna, deprived them of legal rights, seized mills, inns, and forests, persecuted resistance organizers, and increased feudal duties. He even imposed forced labor on holidays, beat defiant peasants, and resettled Vlach shepherds to exploit them for work.
