= Andriy Savka =

Lemko bandit and folk hero

- Born: 13 December 1619; Stebník
- Died: 1661 (aged 41–42); Muszyna
- Cause of death: hanging (capital punishment)
- Other names: Robin Hood of the Lemko region
- Occupation: bandit
- Years active: 1638-1661
- Criminal penalty: hung

Andriy Savka (Rusyn: Андрій Савка; 13 December 1619 – 1661) was a Lemko bandit and folk hero from Dukla. He was born in 1619 in Stebník. In 1651, he led 500 men as part of a peasant revolt known as the Kostka-Napierski Uprising. He was the son of a church cantor, and had some education.

== Biography ==
- Trochanowski, Petro (1999). "Andrii Savka v panteoni Lemkivskŷkh zbiinykiv". Lemkivskii kalendar [Lemko Yearbook] (in Polish). Legnica and Krynica. pp. 50–60. OCLC 271512456.
