= Stebnik =

Stebnik may refer to:

- Stebník, village in Slovakia
- Stebnyk, city in Lviv Oblast, Ukraine
