= Gorals =

Ethnic group of Central Europe

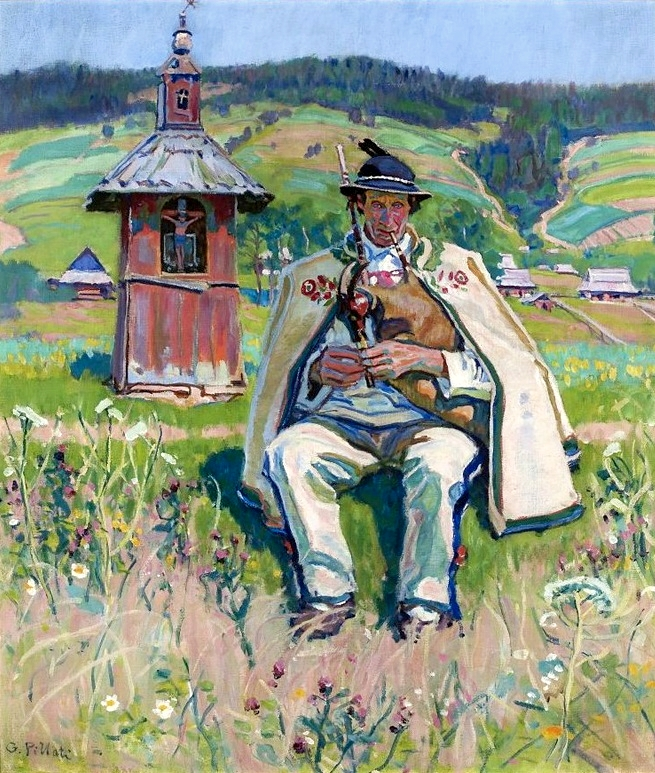
A Goral with bagpipes from the region of Podhale in Poland

The Gorals (Polish: Górale; Goral ethnolect: Górole; Slovak: Gorali; Cieszyn Silesian: Gorole), also anglicized as the Highlanders, (Note: In Poland they are known as the Polish Highlanders and are considered a subethnic group of the Polish nation.) are an ethnographic group with historical ties to the Vlachs. The Goral people are primarily found in their traditional area of southern Poland, northern Slovakia – especially Orava, Spiš and Zamagurie, and in the region of Cieszyn Silesia in the Czech Republic, where they are known as the Silesian Gorals. There is also a significant Goral diaspora in the area of Bukovina in western Ukraine and northern Romania, as well as in Chicago, United States which is the seat of the Polish Highlanders Alliance of North America.

== History ==
The Gorals as a distinct group began to form in the 14th century with the arrival of the first Polish settlers from Lesser Poland, who would settle and farm the lands around what is today Nowy Targ and along the Dunajec valley beginning in the early twelve hundreds. Prior to that, Podhale was an uninhabited region sparsely populated by bandits who chose the inaccessible mountainous terrain to hide from justice. Then between the late 13th and 15th centuries, Vlach shepherds migrated to the region, gradually moving northwest from the Balkan peninsula over the Carpathian Mountains and settling on Polish lands there. The initial contact of the locals with the Vlachs was difficult. The medieval chronicler Jan Długosz described the nomadic shepherds as brutish. However, the newcomers brought with them a distinct method of raising livestock in the mountains, which was different from the one practiced by the settlers from the lowlands of Lesser Poland and thus with the merging of the two cultures, a new local way of life began to emerge, and the subsequent assimilation of the Vlachs.

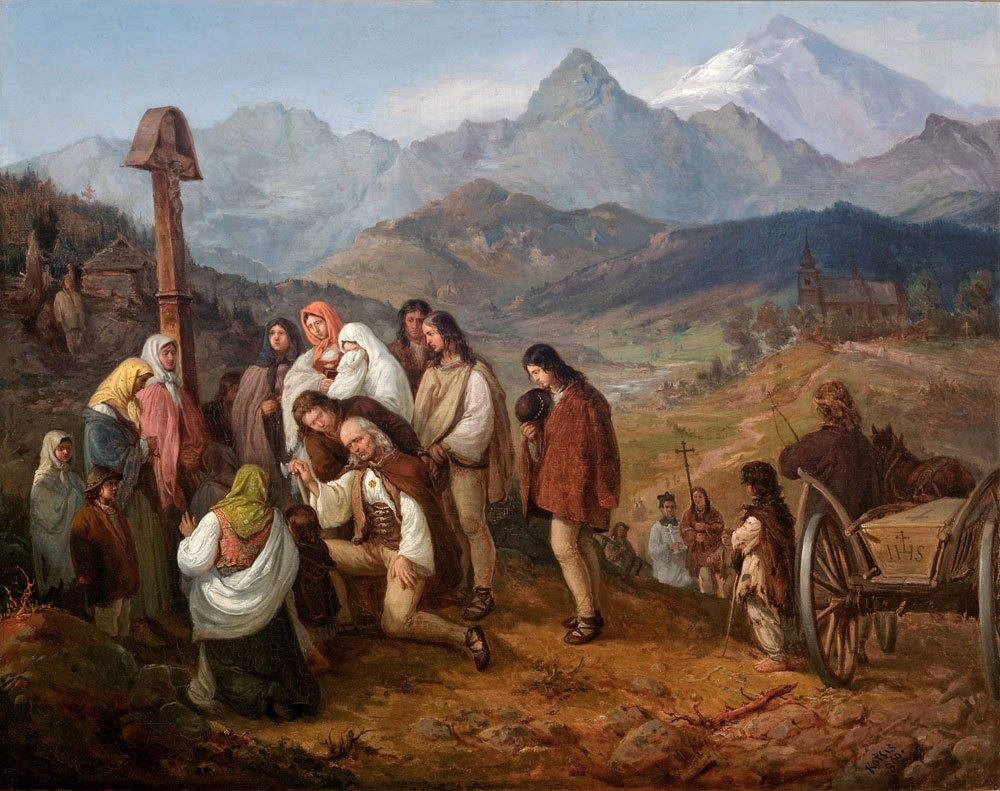
The funeral of a Goral, 1860

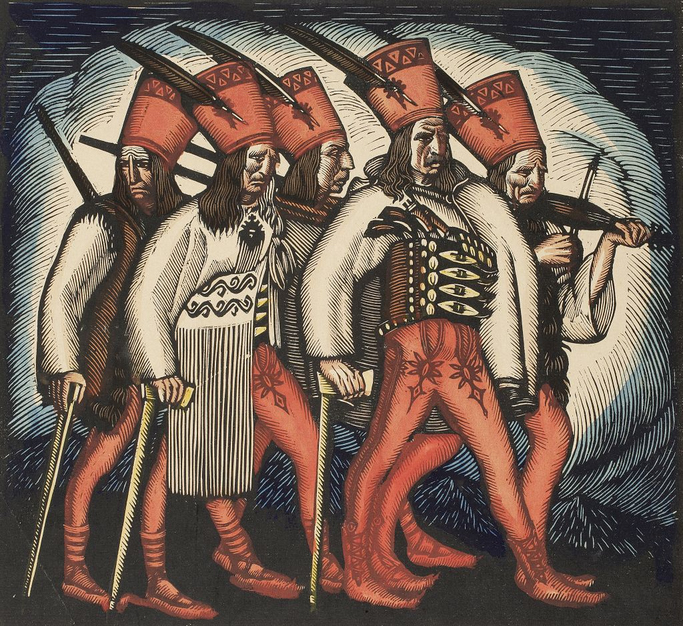
Zbojniks, colored wood engraving by Władysław Skoczylas

In the 16th and 17th centuries, Gorals settled the upper Kysuca and Orava rivers and part of northern Spiš in Slovakia, which at the time were part of the Kingdom of Hungary. Due to various rights and privileges, including the Vlach law, Gorals enjoyed freedom from serfdom and held a substantial amount of autonomy. Also, distinct within the Goral culture were zbojniks, members of local robber bands in the western Carpathians. In folk tradition, they were recognized as heroes who helped the exploited Gorals by stealing from the rich and giving back to the poor. The most famous of these was Juraj Jánošík from the village of Terchová in the Žilina region on the Slovak side of the Carpathian mountains. As a youngster, he fought with the Kuruc insurgents against the Habsburg monarchy and later formed his own band of zbojniks. The phenomenon became widespread in the mid-16th century and disappeared in the 19th century with the death of Wojtek Mateja who was considered as the last zbójnik.

In 1651, the Gorals and local peasantry of Podhale rebelled against the Polish nobles (szlachta) in what became the Kostka-Napierski uprising, led by the adventurer and officer from the Polish army captain Aleksander Kostka Napierski. A film was produced about the uprising (Podhale w ogniu) in 1956, and distributed in many languages across the Eastern Bloc. Another peasant rebellion in Podhale occurred in 1669, when Gorals and local peasants rebelled against high taxes and oppressive rule imposed on them by the local nobility. The first Polish national opera, titled Krakowiacy i Górale (Cracovians and Gorals) composed by Wojciech Bogusławski premiered in 1794. In the 19th century, between 1803 and 1819, the Gorals migrated to Bukovina.

During World War II, Nazi Germany sought to Germanize the Gorals. Under Nazi racial laws, the majority of Poland's population and its minorities were viewed as "undesirable" and subject to special statutes, slave labour and martial law. However, Nazi racial theorists considered the 27,000 strong Goral population as a separate ethnic group from the Poles. Termed Goralenvolk, they were deemed part of the greater Germanic race and given milder treatment from other Poles. Between 1939 and 1945, local Gorals of Podhale joined the resistance movement, including the Tatra Confederation and the IV Batalion Nowy Targ of the 1st Regiment of Home Army Podhale Rifles and fought against Nazi occupation of Poland.

== Population ==
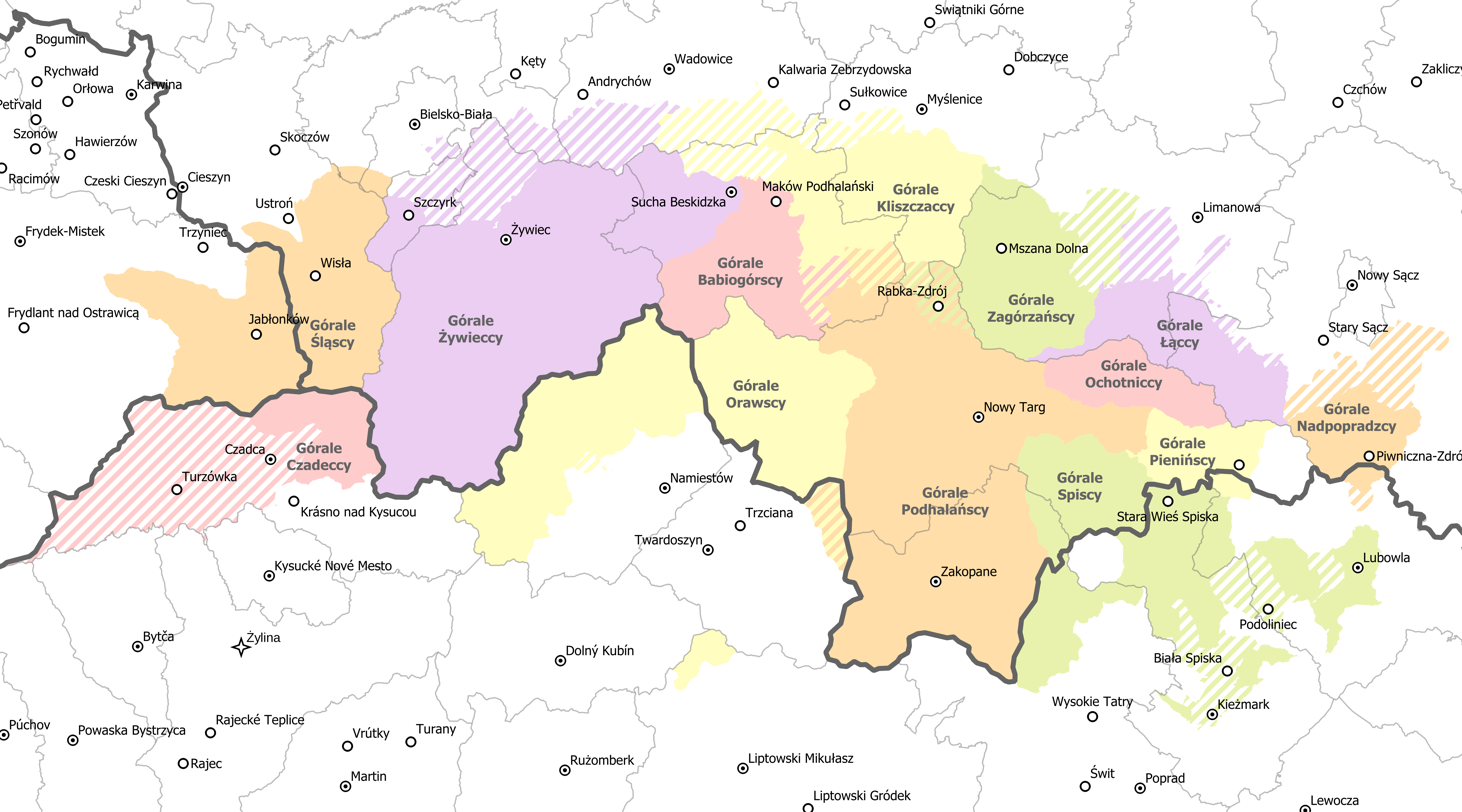
Map of areas inhabited by the Gorals

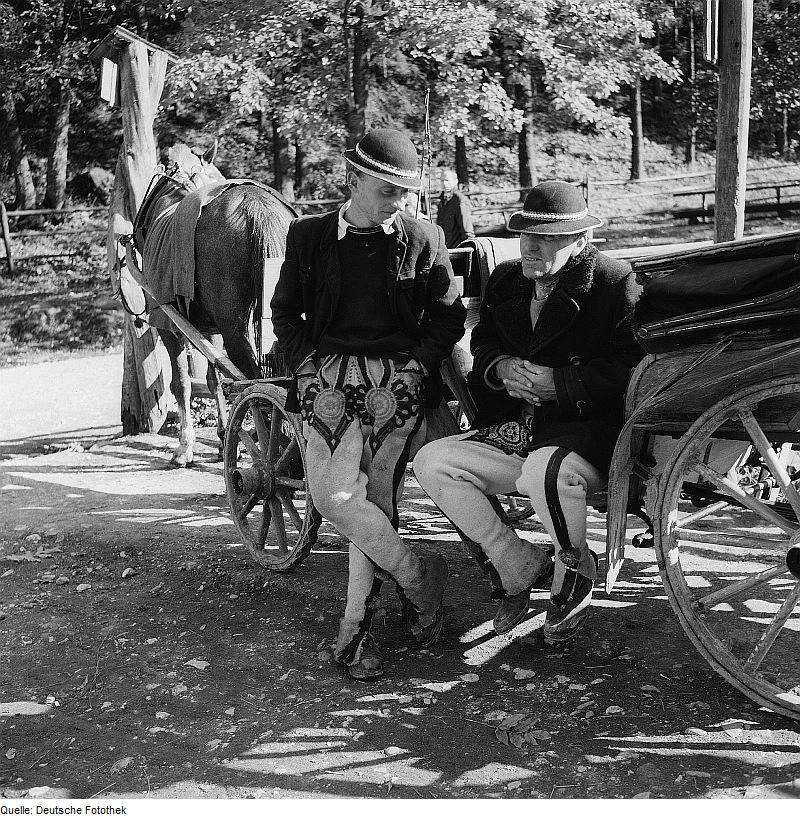
Gorals from Zakopane (1967)

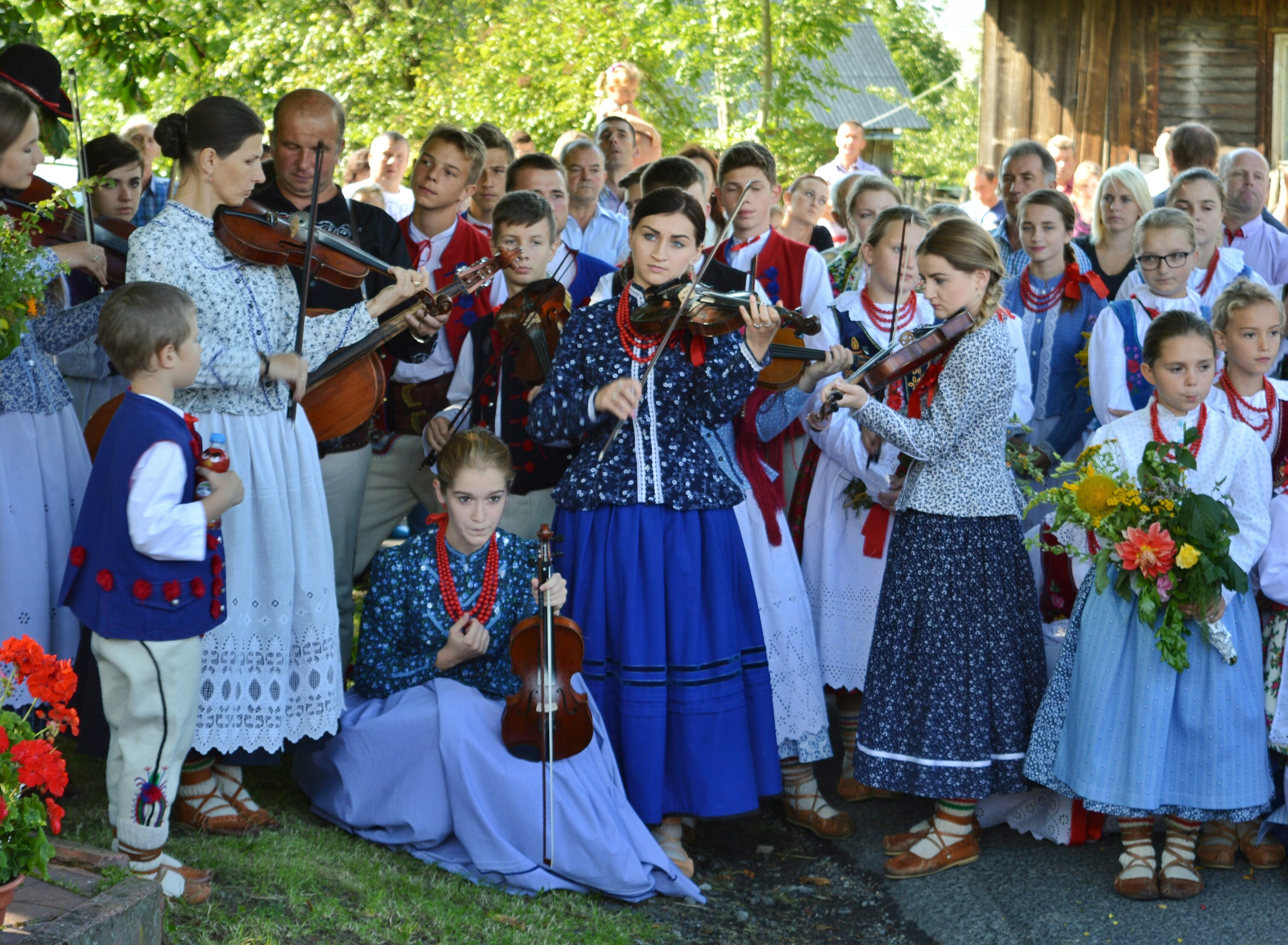
Young Gorals of the Beskid Mountains (Żywiec)

The Gorals inhabit a number of regions collectively referred to as the "Goral lands" (Goral: Góralscýzna, Polish: Góralszczyzna) split between Poland, Slovakia and the Czech Republic. In Poland, the community inhabits the geographical region of Podhale of the Tatra Mountains and parts of the Beskids (Cieszyn Silesia, Silesian Beskids, Żywiec Beskids). After 1945, some Gorals from Bukovina and the Podhale regions found new homes in Lower Silesia in villages such as Krajanów, Czarny Bór, and Borówna in the Central Sudete Mountains, as well as Złotnik, Brzeźnica and Lubomyśl in Lubusz Voivodeship.

In present-day Slovakia they live in several separate groups: in northern Spiš (34 villages subdivided into two groups), Orava and Kysuce (2 villages) and smaller groups in 7 other enclave villages in northern Slovakia.

The main towns of Goral lands include:

- Nowy Targ
- Zakopane
- Żywiec

== Language ==
The various dialects spoken by the Gorals belong to the West Slavic family with influence from other surrounding linguistic groups, notably the Eastern Romance languages. In particular, the dialect spoken in Podhale, called the Podhale dialect (Polish: gwara podhalańska), is of Polish origin and part of the Lesser Poland dialect group, but it has been considerably influenced by Slovak in recent centuries. In addition to Slovak, the Goral dialects contain some vocabulary from Hungarian and other Balkan languages. Kazimierz Dobroslowski asserted that the Podhale dialect had loan-words from Romanian and Albanian, as well as similar belief system elements, music and material culture.

The Podhale dialect is the de facto standard literary Goral ethnolect due to Podhale being the most widely known region. However, the majority of Gorals speak closely related dialects. Gorals themselves rarely differentiate between their dialects and just refer to them as Górolski.

== National identity ==
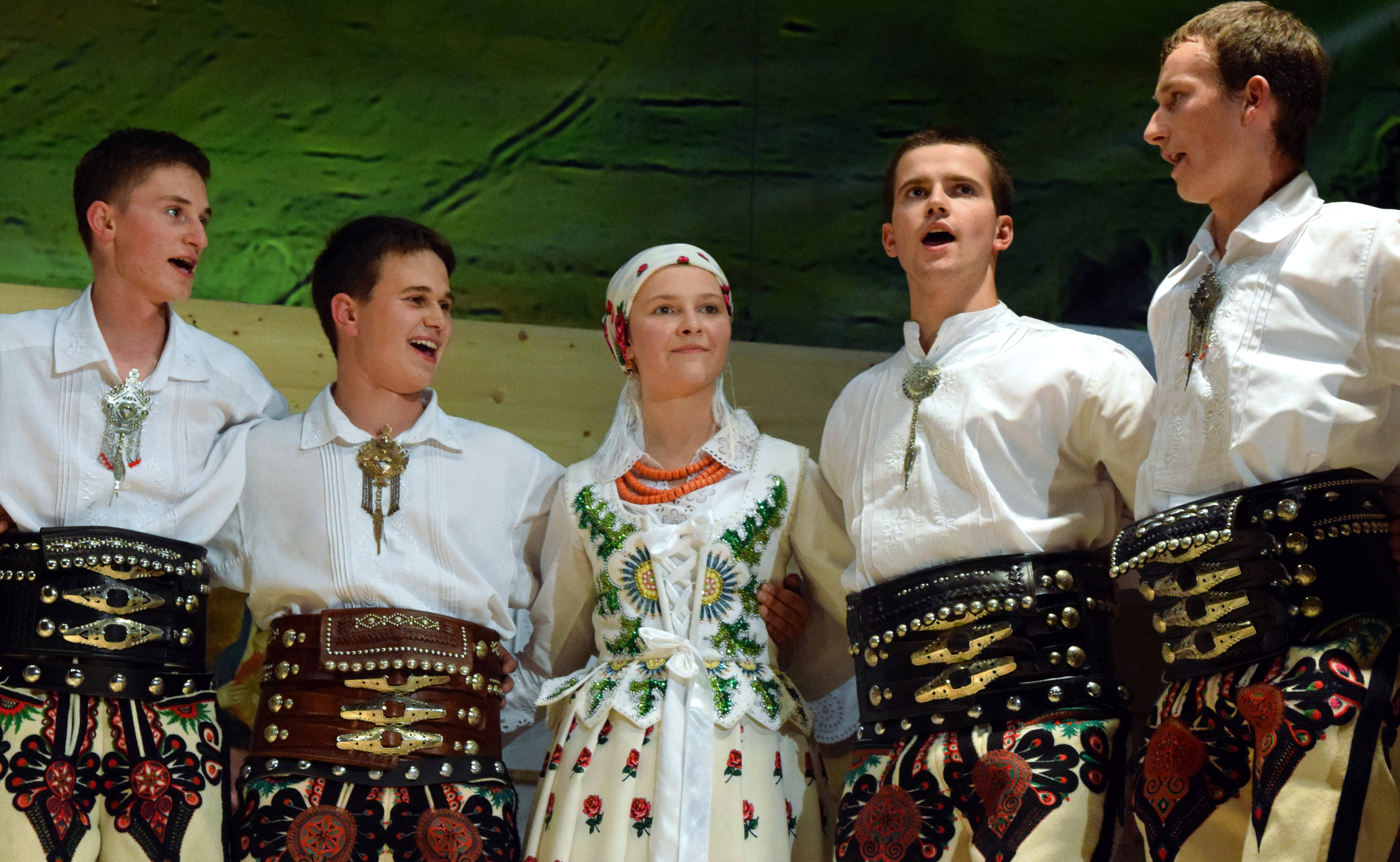
Gorals of Podhale, Zakopane

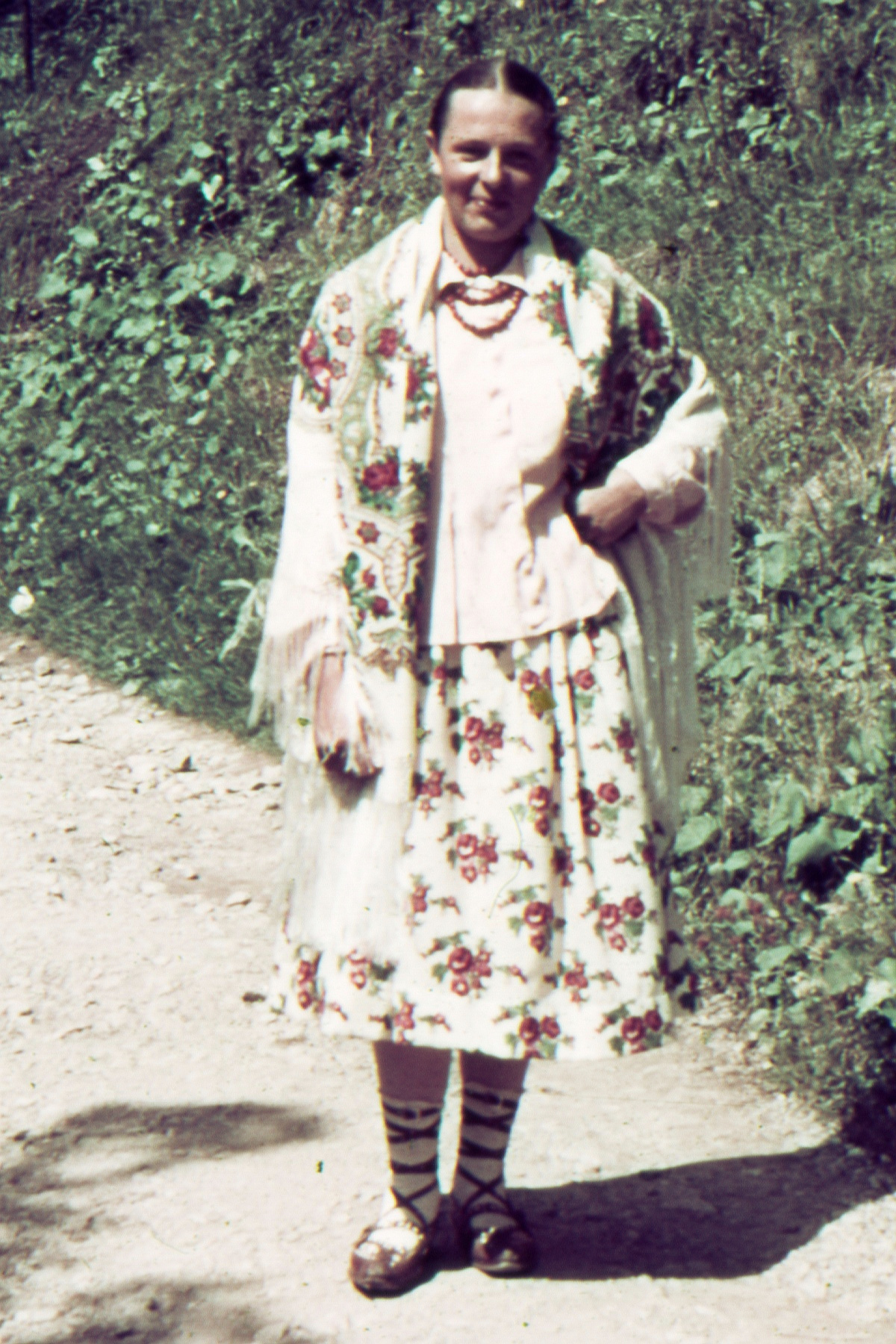
Goral from Zakopane, Poland (1938)

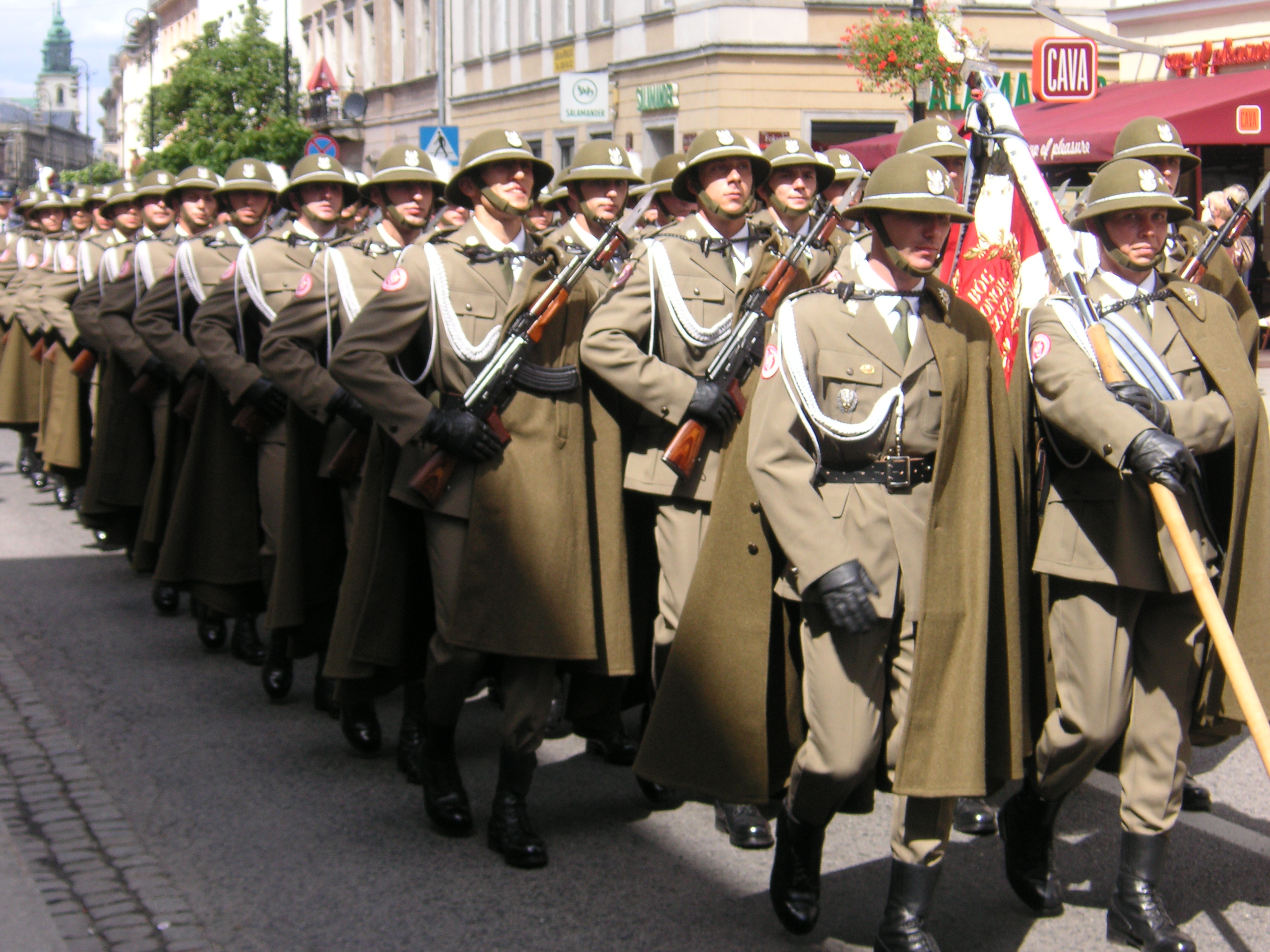
Podhale Rifles (Podhalańczycy), are a mountain infantry formation of the Polish Army formed in 1918 out of volunteers of the region of Podhale. They wear the traditional Goral cap and are one of only two infantry units wearing non-standard uniforms based on traditional Polish folk garment.

For most Gorals today, the decisive factor in their self-identification with nationality is not ethnic but territorial. For example, those living in areas under a long tradition of belonging to the Polish state identify themselves as Polish, while those living in Slovakia have identified themselves as Slovaks, with notable exceptions to this rule on both sides of the border. While the origin of the Goral ethnolect is Polish, the language of Gorals in Slovakia and in the Czech Republic is gradually shifting and increasingly becoming more similar to the literary standard in their respective countries.

Silesian Gorals of the Czech Republic identify themselves on the nationality level as Poles and are members of the Polish minority in the Czech Republic, which is proved by their communal activity: the annual Gorolski Święto festival held in Jablunkov is a showcase of a local Polish Goral traditions and is organized by the PZKO (Polish Cultural and Educational Union). This Goral festival preserves the traditions of the Polish nationality group in Trans-Olza. It is the largest cultural and folklore festival in Trans-Olza gathering thousands of spectators each day of festivities. However, the Poles do not form a majority in any of the municipalities of the area, and some local Gorals identify themselves on the nationality level as Czechs. In this respect, the village of Hrčava (the second easternmost village in the Czech Republic), with the vast majority of citizens declaring Czech nationality, can be noted. In this village, the Poles form only a 2% minority. Local Silesian Gorals formed a majority in the past and they speak the regional Cieszyn Silesian dialect in everyday communication. In Slovakia, Gorals sought formal recognition as a distinct minority, something the Slovak government approved in January 2025; the status means the group will gain representation in the government's Council for National Minorities, and get more access to cultural support funding.

Historically, the issue of their ethnic identity has been controversial and resulted in claims and counterclaims by both Poland and Czechoslovakia. Gorals, like many other peasant communities in Central Europe, determined their own ethnic identities within the nation-state system during the 19th and early 20th century. Although nationalist propaganda was generated by both Poles and Slovaks, this process of the Gorals' identification with a nationality was still not complete when the border was finalized in 1924. A notable example was Ferdynand Machay, a priest born in Jabłonka, Orava, Piotr Borowy from Rabča, Orava and Wojciech Halczyn from Lendak, Spiš, who went to the 1919 Paris Peace Conference and, during a personal audience, lobbied U.S. president Woodrow Wilson to sign these lands over to Poland.

The Gorals have a similar belief system elements, music and material culture as that of the Vlachs and related groups (e.g. Moravian Vlachs), from whom it has been argued they originate. Anthropologist Carleton Coon grouped Gorals with the Hutsuls, who dwelled in what was then the southeastern corner of Poland and is now southwestern Ukraine. In the 19th century, Polish scholars viewed the Gorals as linguistically close to the Poles, but having close ties with Slovak folk culture. It was noted that Gorals' social and economic life resembled that of Vlach shepherd culture.

== Culture ==
=== Architecture ===
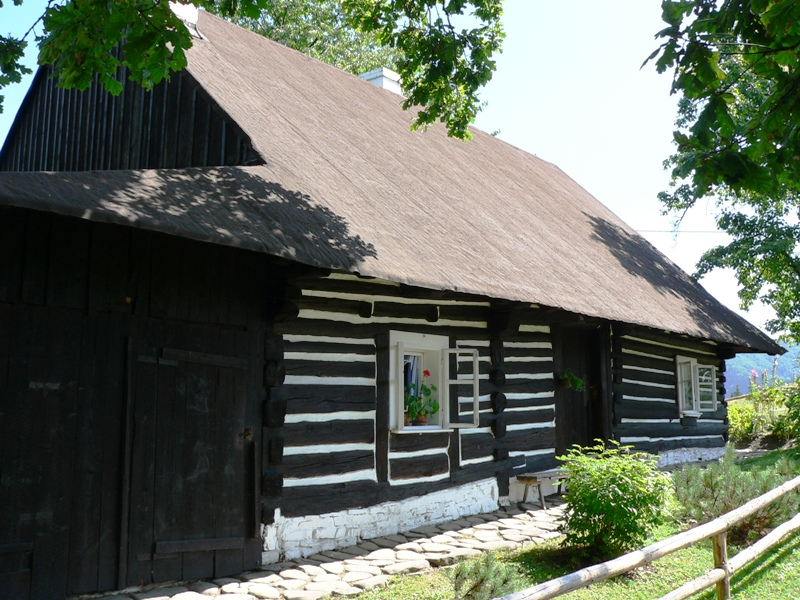
Traditional Goral wooden house (drzewionka) near Filipka mountain meadow in Silesian Beskids

The Zakopane Style architecture, established at the end of the 19th century, is held as a Goral tradition. The architectural style draws on local architecture and Vernacular architecture of the Carpathians, and is widespread in the Podhale region.

=== Music ===
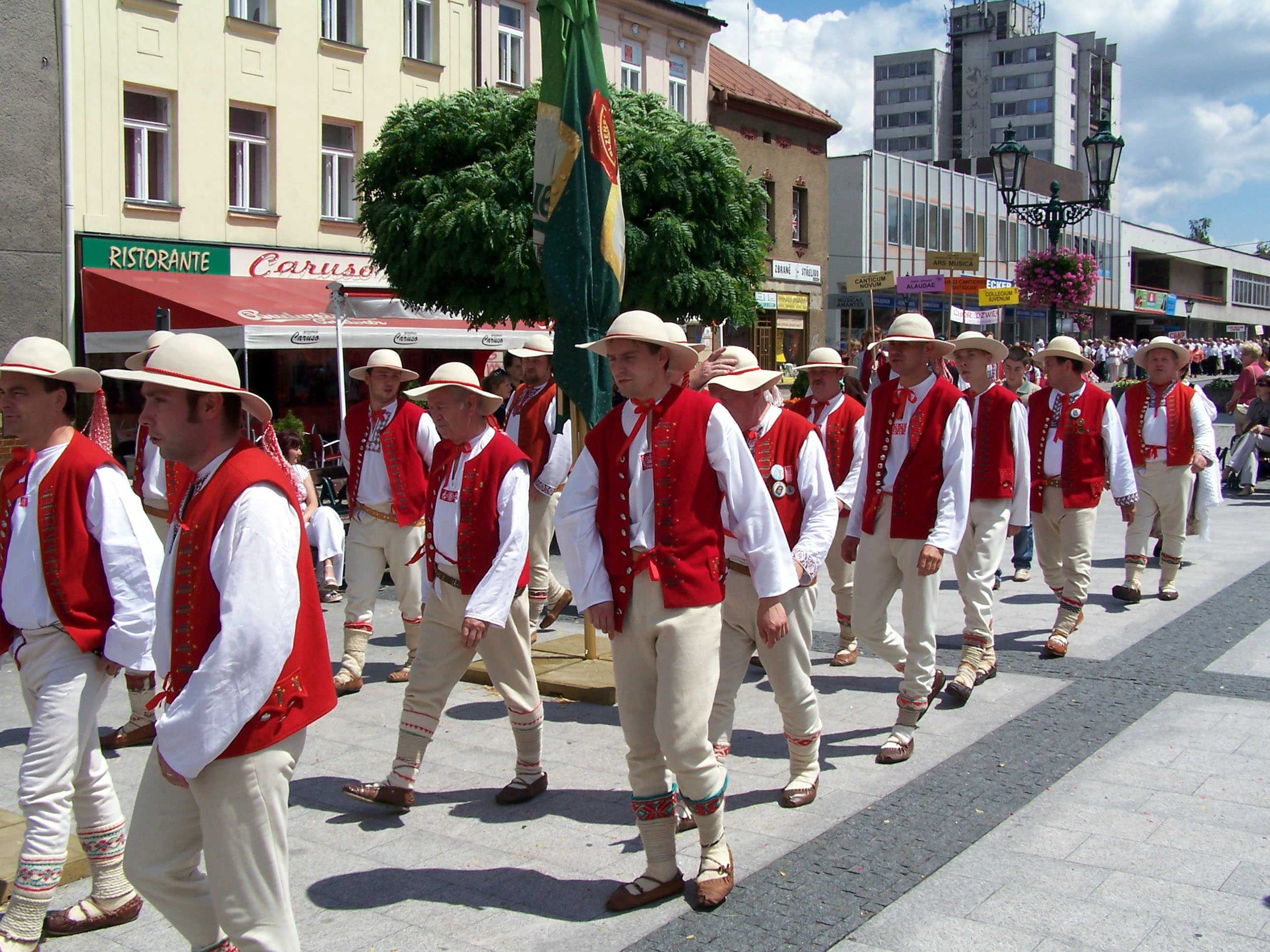
Gorol men's choir from Jablunkov during the parade at the beginning of the Jubileuszowy Festiwal PZKO 2007 in Karviná

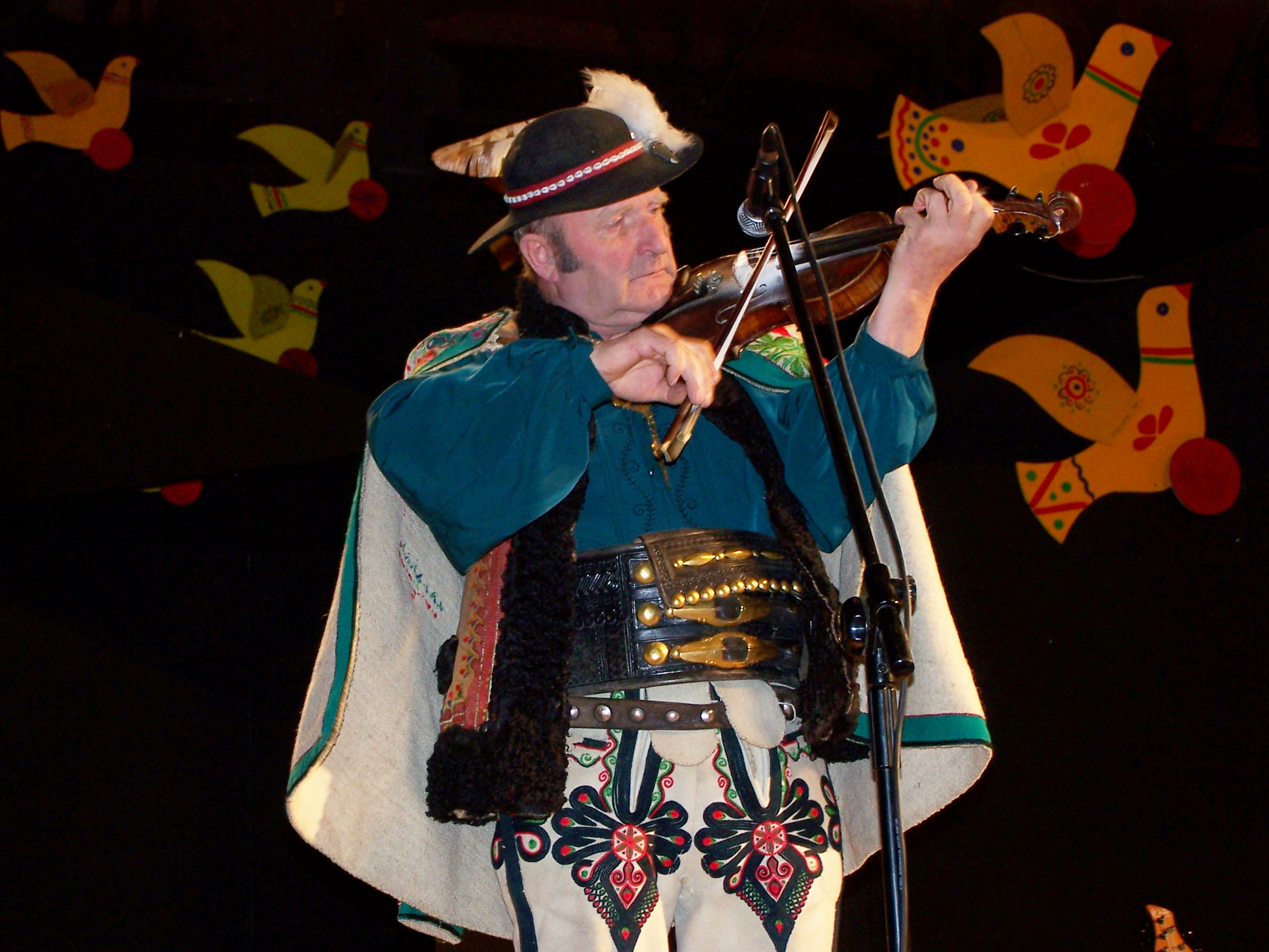
Goral of Podhale – member of Trebunie-Tutki folk band from Zakopane

Zakopower is a popular folk-pop musical group from Zakopane. The Trebunie-Tutki folk musical group from Zakopane blend traditional Goral music with reggae.

=== Folk costume ===
==== Clasps ====
For centuries clasps have been an important element of Goral traditional costumes. Originally used for fastening shirts, they fell out of use when buttons became popular, remaining only as ornaments. In the early 20th century they were already rare, used only by senior and young shepherds, who grazed their sheep on mountain pastures. In the 1920s and the 1930s, they were considered collector's items and sought after by tourists. In Zakopane, they were often worn as ornaments for the "cucha" (outerwear), sweaters, or occasionally on leather bags. Today the clasps are a popular element of highlanders from the Podhale region, but the way they are worn differs from the original one: instead of fastening shirts they are usually attached to them or sewed on.

==== Parzenica (embroidery) ====
The parzenica embroidery dates back to the mid-19th century. Initially, they were simple string loops, used for reinforcing cuts in front of cloth trousers. They had practical functions and protected the cloth from fraying. The modern look parzenica got from those tailors who began using red or navy blue string, simultaneously increasing the number of loops. Later the appliqué design was replaced with embroidery. Using woollen yarn allowed the parzenica to become more colourful and eventually it became a stand-alone trouser ornamentation, developed by talented tailors and embroiderers.

==== Corsets ====
In the second half of the 19th century, it became fashionable in the Podhale region to adorn corsets with depictions of thistle and edelweiss. These motifs were the most popular in the early 20th century. When "Kraków style" came into fashion, highlanders of the Podhale region began ornamenting the corsets with shiny sequins and glass beads.

==== Other ====
In Cieszyn Silesia and northern Slovakia, the shepherd's axe and elements of the folk costume are termed Vlach (Polish: wałaska, wałaszczaki, Slovak: valaška).

Goral folk costumes can be found in the National Museum of Ethnography in Warsaw, The Tatra Museum in Zakopane, the Ethnographic Museum of Kraków, and the City Museum of Żywiec.

=== Religion ===
Most Gorals are adherents of the Roman Catholic Church and are often noted for their staunch religiosity. The Sanctuary of Our Lady of Ludźmierz is of particular significance to the Gorals, being the oldest shrine in the Podhale region. Also, there are numerous Catholic religious cults and traditions connected to the church.

The Polish Gorals also hold a particular reference for Pope John Paul II, who they consider as their own, even though Karol Wojtyła was born in Wadowice, Lesser Poland and was not a Goral himself. However, the Late Pope was always considered as "the son of the mountains" by the Gorals.

A notable portion of Gorals are Augsburg Confession Lutherans, who are clustered around the town of Wisła. This is the main centre of Protestant Gorals, and it is the only city in Poland where Catholics are a minority.

In Slovakia, significant portions of Goral settlements fall under the territorial jurisdictions of Roman Catholic Diocese of Spiš.

== Notable people ==
- Tomasz Adamek (born 1976), Polish boxer and WBC light heavyweight and IBF cruiserweight champion
- Klemens Bachleda (1851–1910), Polish mountain guide
- Alicja Bachleda-Curuś (born 1983), Polish actress
- Stefan Banach (1892–1945), Polish mathematician
- Tadeusz Błażusiak (born 1983), Polish sport motorcyclist
- Józef Cukier (1889–1960), Goralenvolk leader
- Andrzej Dziubek (born 1954), Polish–Norwegian musician
- Wojciech Fortuna (born 1952), Polish ski jumper and Olympic gold medalist
- Sebastian Karpiel-Bułecka (born 1976), Polish singer
- Justyna Kowalczyk (born 1983), Polish cross-country skier and Olympic gold medalist
- Wacław Krzeptowski (1897–1945), Goralenvolk leader
- Dawid Kubacki (born 1990), Polish ski jumper and Olympic bronze medalist
- Jerzy Kukuczka (1948–1989), Polish alpinist
- Adam Małysz (born 1977) Polish ski jumper and Olympic silver medalist
- Władysław Orkan (1875–1930), Polish writer
- Jan Kanty Pawluśkiewicz (born 1942), Polish composer
- Kazimierz Przerwa-Tetmajer (1865–1940), Polish writer
- Kamil Stoch (born 1987), Polish ski jumper and Olympic gold medalist
- Augustyn Suski (1907–1942), Polish poet and World War II resistance fighter
- Włodzimierz Tetmajer (1861–1923), Polish painter
- Józef Tischner (1931–2000), Polish priest and philosopher

== See also ==
- Gorani, a Slavic Muslim highlander people in Kosovo.
- Pogorzans
- Rusyns, an ethnic group who speak an East Slavic language, neighbor the Gorals in south-eastern Poland, north-eastern Slovakia and the Transcarpathian Oblast of Ukraine.
