= Kostka-Napierski uprising =

Polish peasant uprising

- Part of Khmelnytsky Uprising
Date	14–24 June 1651
Location	Podhale, Polish–Lithuanian Commonwealth
Result	Suppression of uprising and execution of leaders

Belligerents
Podhale peasants (Gorals); Lemko rebels	(Polish–Lithuanian Commonwealth) Polish-Lithuanian Commonwealth

Commanders and leaders
Aleksander Kostka Napierski (executed); Stanisław Łętowski (executed); Marcin Radocki (executed); Andriy Savka	Wilhelm Jarocki; Michał Jordan

Strength
	1,000

The Kostka Napierski uprising (Polish: Powstanie chłopskie pod wodzą Kostki-Napierskiego) was a peasant revolt in Poland in 1651.

== Background ==
It took place at the same time as the more important Khmelnytsky Uprising, in the south-east part of the Polish–Lithuanian Commonwealth, and during the Swedish preparations to invade the Commonwealth.

== Uprising ==
Aleksander Kostka Napierski was an adventurer and officer in the Polish army. During the revolt, he acted most likely as a spy for Bohdan Khmelnytsky or the Prince of Transylvania. He recruited his forces from among some rebellious gorals in Podhale, a mountainous region in Lesser Poland. They attacked and captured the castle of Czorsztyn in Pieniny.

Napierski called on every peasant in Poland to rise and overthrow the nobles and remove them from their positions of power. His attempts to spread the revolt were totally unsuccessful. Napierski and his rebel group remained isolated in the castle, which was soon recaptured by the forces of Piotr Gembicki, the bishop of Kraków. Napierski and the other leaders of the revolt were impaled.

== Legacy ==
Research conducted by Polish historian Adam Kersten has shown that many facts about Napierski and his plans are difficult or even impossible to bring to light. It is claimed that Napierski's attempt to lead a revolt by the peasants in Lesser Poland was aimed at disorganizing the Polish defence against Khmelnytsky's advancing armies. In fact, 2000 troops were sent by the king from Ukraine to crush the rebellion. Additionally, Napierski was executed before they had even reached Czorsztyn. Even without those troops, the Polish army won a decisive victory at the Battle of Berestechko.

The rebellion has been remembered alongside the 1630-1633 uprising in Podhale and the 1669-1670 uprising as fights for Goral freedom and as the times (1669-1670 and 1630-1633 uprisings) when Gorals were free and ruled themselves, especially by Goral activists like Władysław Orkan. The uprising has also been used in communist propaganda and portrayed as a rebellion against the bourgeoisie.

== See also ==
- Serfdom in Poland
- Peasant rebellion in Podhale (1669–1670)
- Podhale w ogniu
- Vlach uprisings in Moravia

== Sources ==
- Kersten, Adam, 1970: Na tropach Napierskiego, pp. 174–175. Warszawa
- Łepkowski, Tadeusz, 1973: Słownik historii Polski. Warszawa
- Szczotka, Stanisław, 1951: Powstanie chłopskie pod wodzą Kostki-Napierskiego. Warszawa: Ludowa Spółdzielnia Wydawnicza
