= Parzenica (folk pattern) =

Decorative heart knot on male folk costume in Podhale region, Poland

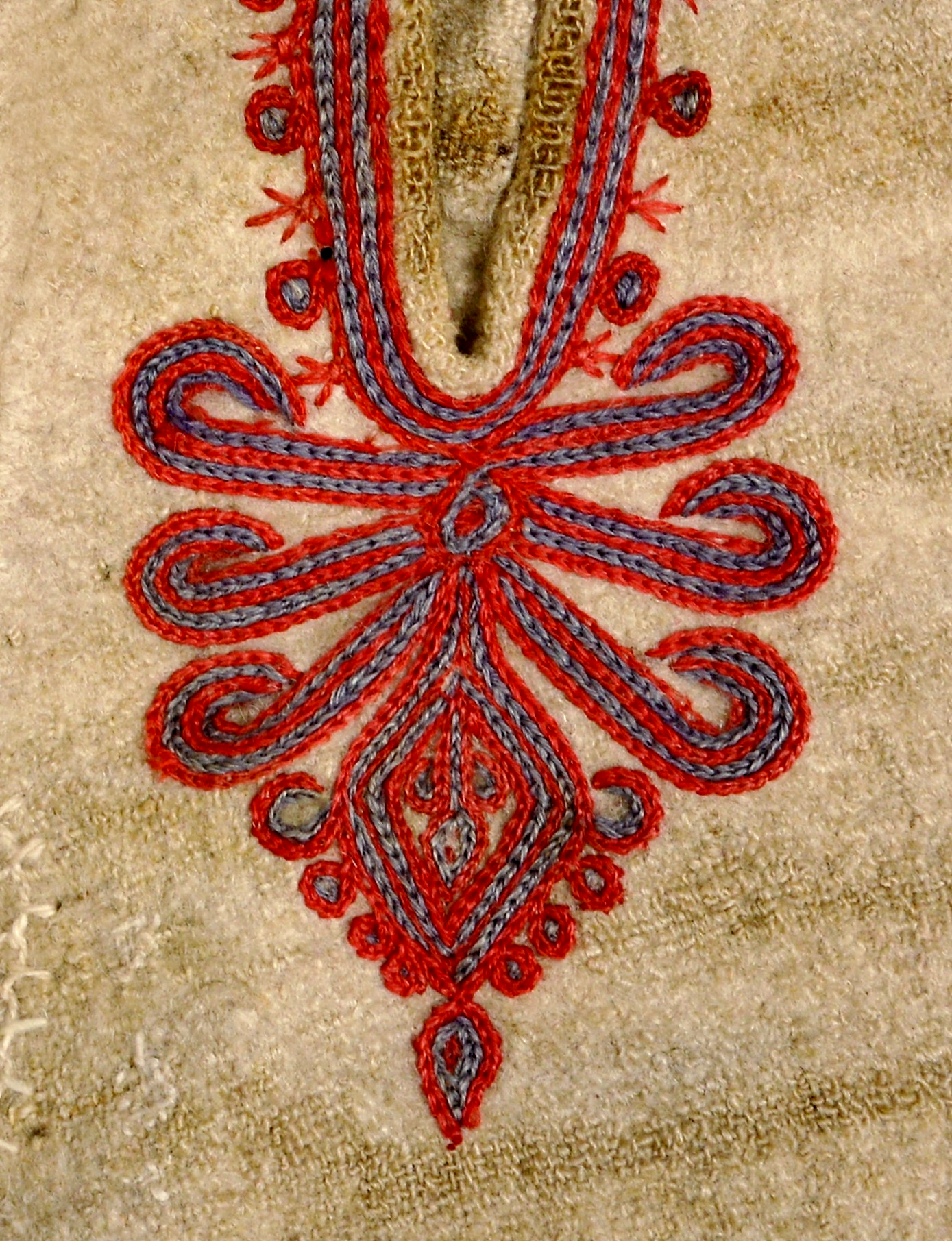
Parzenica embroidery on 19th century men's trousers, Podhale. Collection of the Tatra Museum in Zakopane.

A parzenica is a heart-shaped traditional handicraft pattern and decorative folk art of the Goral people, who live in the mountainous region of southern Poland and parts of northern Slovakia. It is often found embroidered on the upper front of men's trousers.

== History ==
This characteristic decorative motif probably originated in Hungary, and by the beginning of the 20th century it became one of the most recognisable decorative patterns in the Podhale region. The origin of the term is unclear, it is possibly related to old-Polish verbs parznąć and parznić meaning to make some object filthy. Initially the name also applied to various other objects popular in everyday life of the Goral people, including wooden forms used in cheese production and heart-shaped motifs used in wood carving.^{.}The origin of the pattern itself is also unclear, some authors believe that it was imported from Hungary. In the second half of the 19th century, the first parzenicas made in the Tatras were but simple string loops, used for reinforcing cuts in front of cloth trousers. Such loops prevented wool fabric from fraying. With time local craftsmen adopted navy blue or red string and added additional loops to create an ornamental design rather than a simple loop. With time the appliqué design was replaced with embroidery and more colours were added.

== Description ==
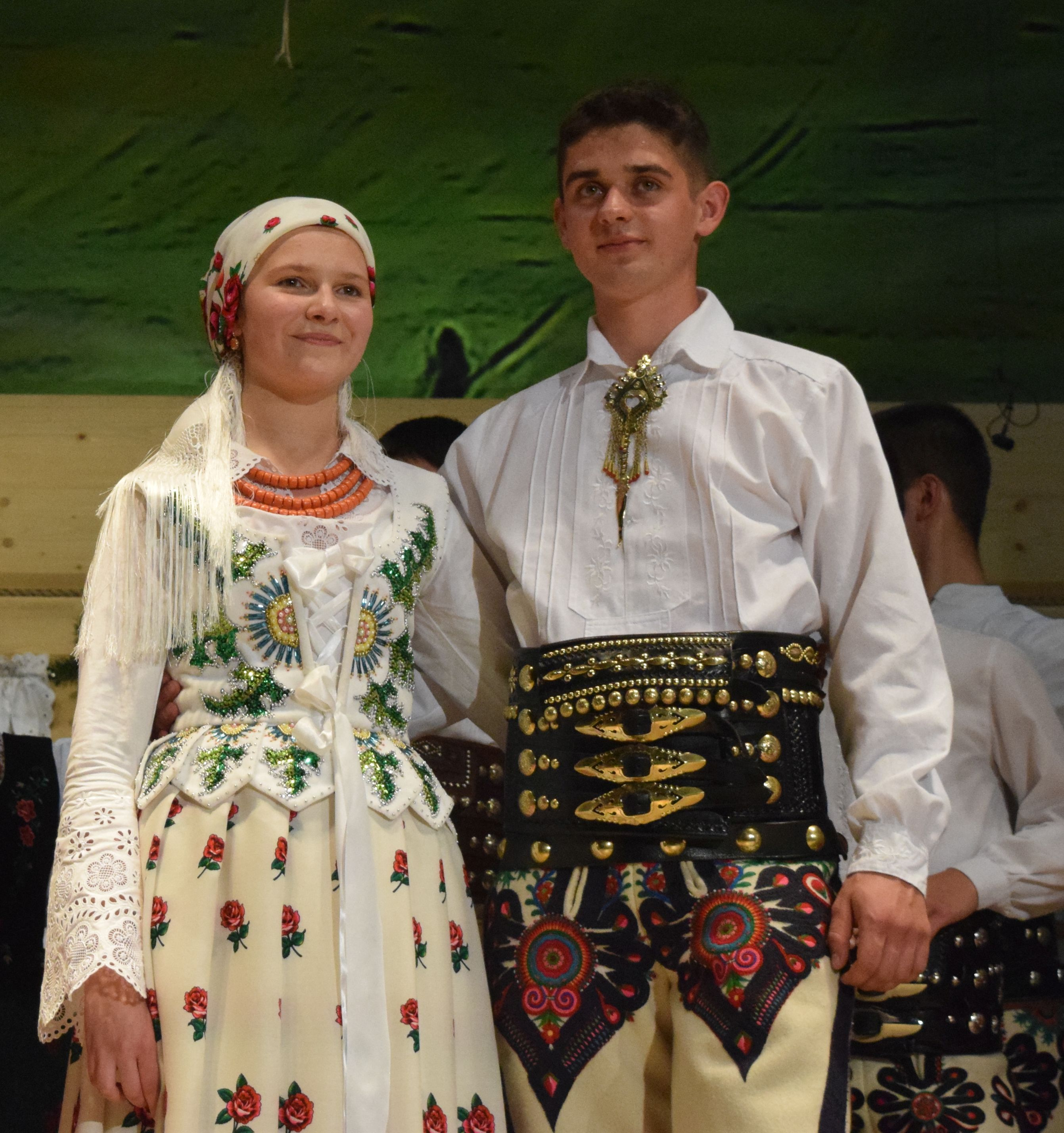
Folk costumes from Podhale, parzenica embroidery on the man's trousers

The parzenica embroidery (also called cyfra) dates back to the mid-19th century. Initially they were simple string loops, used for reinforcing cuts in front of cloth trousers. They had practical functions and protected the cloth from fraying. The "Knightly knot" is a decorative motif laid in three-loops of string, characteristic for highlander's male costume, often used as base for parzenica. It is one of the oldest types of parzenicas, present in the traditional costume of highlanders of Beskid Sądecki, Gorce Mountains and other areas.

The modern look parzenica got from those tailors who began using red or navy blue string, simultaneously increasing the number of loops. Later the appliqué design was replaced with embroidery. Using woollen yarn allowed the parzenica to become more colourful and eventually it became a stand-alone trouser ornamentation, developed by talented tailors and embroiderers.

== See also ==
- Gorals
- National costumes of Poland
