= Komorowski (Korczak) =

Polish noble family

Korczak coat of arms of the Komorowski family

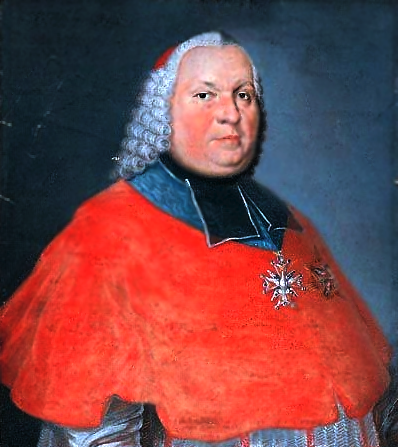
Adam Ignacy Komorowski, Primate of Poland

The House of Komorowski (plural: Komorowscy, feminine form: Komorowska) is an old and influential Polish aristocratic family whose ancestral seat was Komorów in the Duchy of Belz. (Note: There are several places in Poland called Komorów; see pl:Komorów for a larger list than in English Wikipedia. There are also several places in Ukraine whose Polish name is Komarów; see uk:Комарів. Belz, onetime capital of the Duchy of Belz, is nowadays in Ukraine. At least three of the Ukrainian places are close to Belz: Komariv, Halych Raion, Komariv, Sokal Raion and Komariv, Stryi Raion. There seems to be no good evidence as to which, if any, of those was the Komorowski family seat. All that can be said is that Komariv, Halych Raion appears to have the oldest history.)

== History and titles ==
The first mentions of the Komorowski family come from the 14th century. Its progenitor was the knight Dymitr Komorowski of Komorów. Throughout the centuries, they acquired estates and titles. They held the title Count of Liptov and Orawa, which was given to them in 1467 by the Polish king Casimir IV Jagiellon and confirmed in 1469 by the Hungarian king, Matthias Corvinus. In 1793 they were granted the title of Count in Galicia by Francis II, Holy Roman Emperor. After the dissolution of the Holy Roman Empire their titles were confirmed in 1820 by the Deputation of the Senate of Poland, in 1844 by the State Council of the Russian Empire and in 1892 by the Austro-Hungarian Empire.

== Coat of arms ==
Coat of Arms of Counts Komorowski

== Notable members ==
- Adam Ignacy Komorowski – Primate of Poland
- Anna Maria Komorowska – wife of Patrick d'Udekem d'Acoz and mother of Queen Mathilde of Belgium
- Bronisław Komorowski – President of Poland from August 6, 2010, to August 6, 2015
- Gertruda Komorowska – wife of Stanisław Szczęsny Potocki
- Helena Komorowska – second wife of Bohdan Chmielnicki
- Ignacy Komorowski – castellan of Chełmno
- Józef Joachim Komorowski – member of the Targowica Confederation
- Krzysztof Komorowski - Polish historian specializing in the Polish military history
- pl:Krzysztof Komorowski (zm. 1608) - castellan of Nowy Sącz and Oświęcim, owner of the Żywiec state
- Maja Komorowska – actress
- Mikolaj Komorowski – count of Liptov and Orava
- Tadeusz Bór-Komorowski – military leader of the Armia Krajowa
- Zygmunt Komorowski – professor at Warsaw University

== Palaces ==
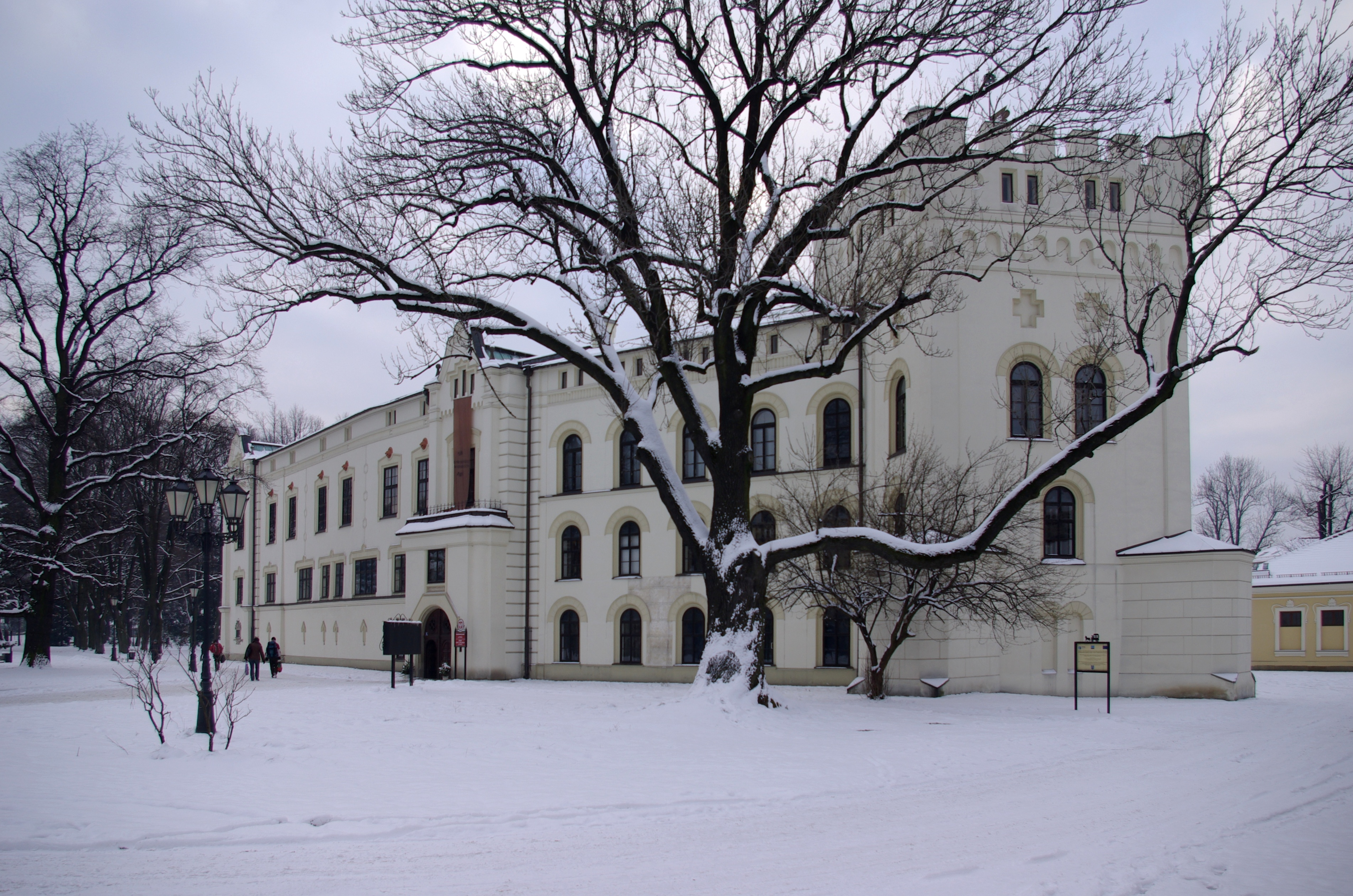
The Old Castle in Żywiec

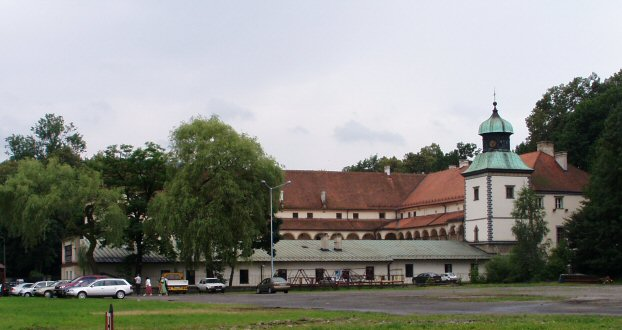
Castle in Sucha Beskidzka

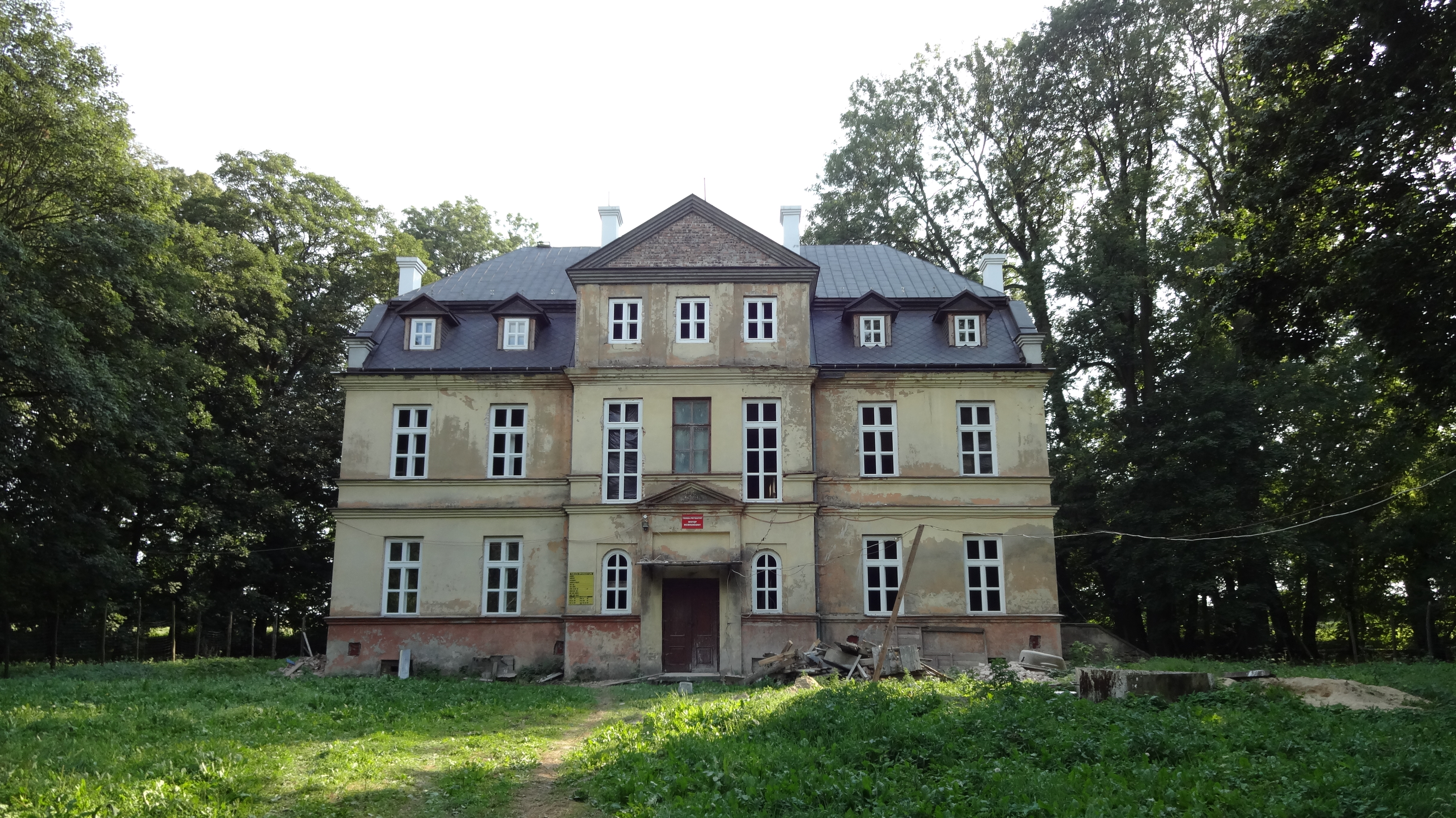
Palace in Siedliska, Zawiercie County

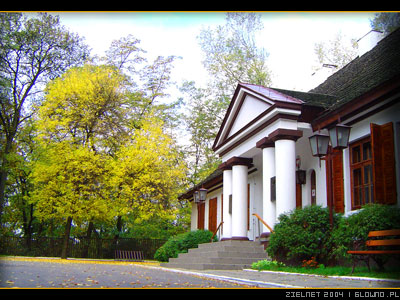
Manor Park "Zabrzeźnia" in Głowno

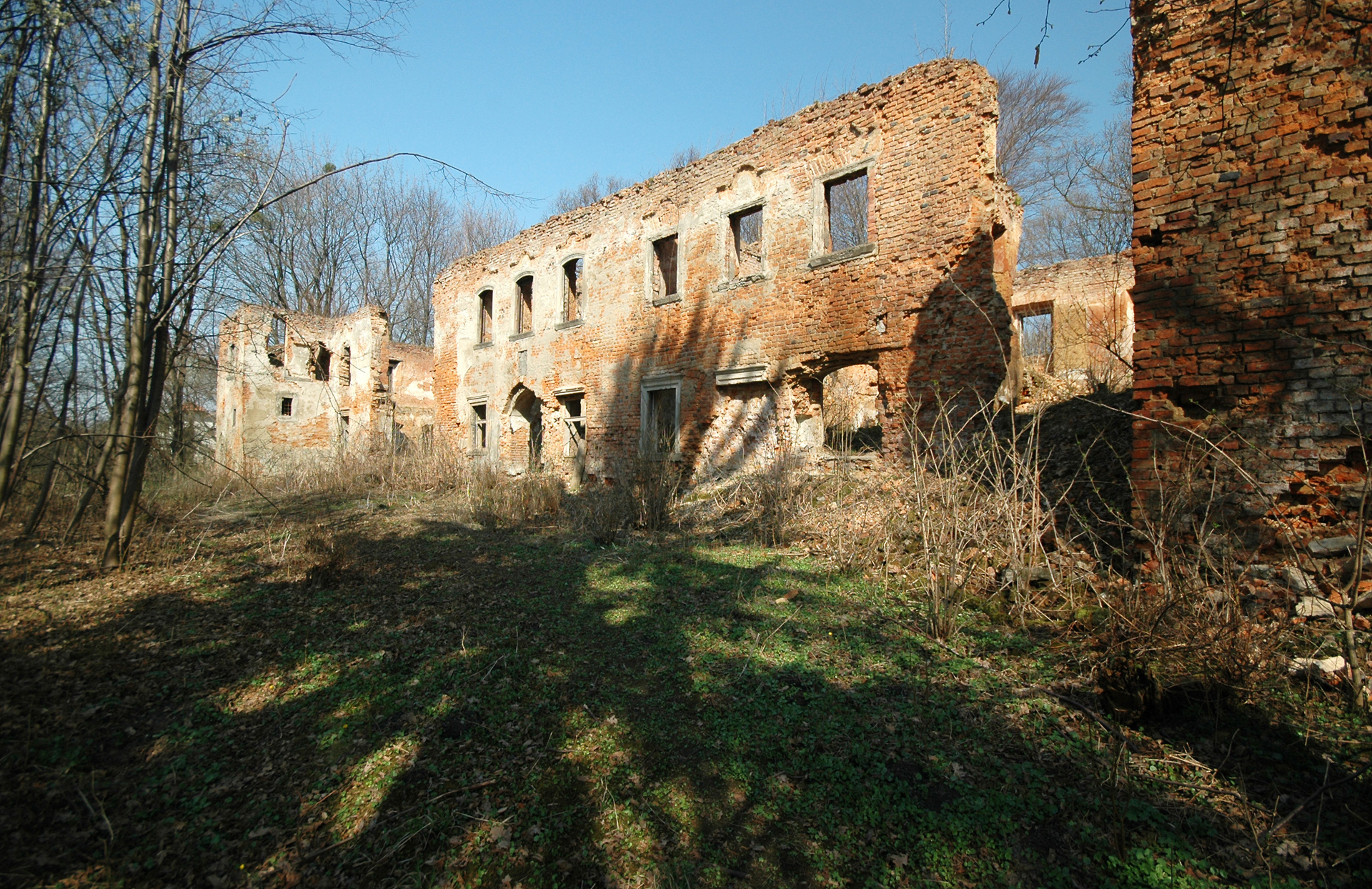
Ruins of the Palace in Głębowice

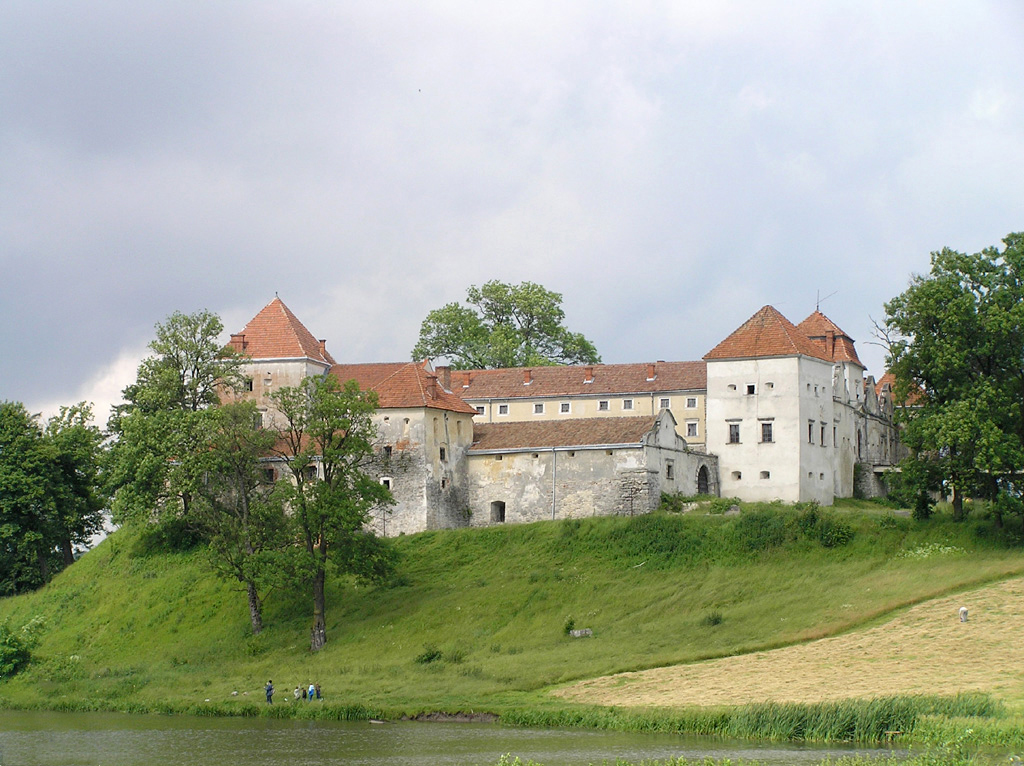
Castle in Świrz

== See also ==
- Komorowski family of Ciołek coat of arms
- d'Udekem d'Acoz family

== Bibliography ==
- Jana Długosza kanonika krakowskiego Dziejów polskich ksiąg dwanaście, przeł. K. Mecherzyński, t. V, ks. 12, Kraków 1870, s. 622-623
