= Vlach uprisings in Moravia =

- Part of the Thirty Years' War
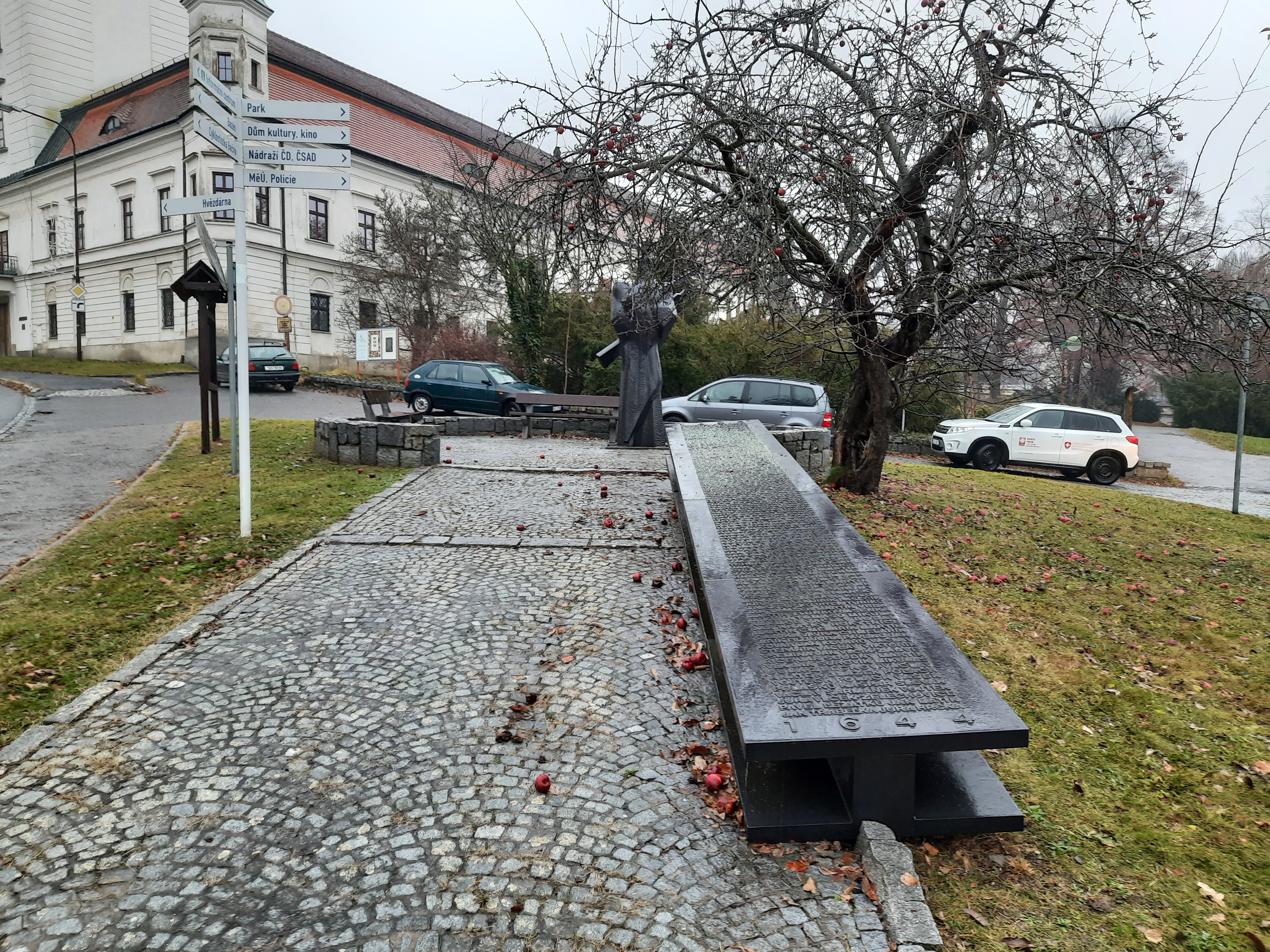
- Memorial of the Vlachs executed after the battle of Vsetín in 1644 near the Vsetín Chateau
| Date | 1622–1644 |
| Location | Moravia |
| Result | Vlachs Uprisings crushed |

Belligerents
| Vlachs (Denmark–Norway) Denmark-Norway (yes) Swedish Empire | (Holy Roman Empire) Habsburgs • (Kingdom of Bohemia) Bohemia |

Commanders and leaders
| Jan Adam z Víckova; Hetman Jan Kovár (Denmark–Norway) Ernst von Mansfeld # (Swedish Empire) Lennart Torstensson | (Holy Roman Empire) Albrecht von Wallenstein X (Holy Roman Empire) Henri de Dampierre # |

Strength
| Unknown | Unknown |

Casualties and losses
| Heavy | Unknown |

During the Thirty Years' War (1618–48), there were several Vlach uprisings in Moravia. The Vlachs (or Wallachians) were a pastoralist community in Moravian Wallachia of eastern Moravia in what is today the Czech Republic.

== History ==
The Moravian Vlachs are mentioned during the Thirty Years' War (1618–48). The Vlach law were at this time in danger of being abolished. Jan Amos Comenius wrote in 1620: "Moravians of the mountains around Vsetín, called Wallachians, are a warlike people… they refused to accept the Habsburg yoke and for three whole years defended their freedom with the sword". Later, in 1624, he wrote: "the inhabitants of the lordship of Vsetín and the mountains thereabout continued to resist with arms and could not be brought to deny their faith or offer submission".

Some continued to practice Orthodox Christianity, most converted to Protestantism, while on the whole, resisting any attempts of the Jesuit missionaries to convert them to Catholicism. Due to this situation, in 1632 the Catholic Church and the Habsburg Empire took coercive measures: "the inhabitants of Valašsko were Vlachs and hence utterly infractory". Zlín town records from 1621 refer to "the Wallachians, who are the local rabble". Albrecht von Wallenstein, Habsburg military lord of Vsetín, wrote in 1621 about the expected uprising and referred to them as Wallachians against whom he did not have sufficient support to mount a campaign. A Habsburg commissioner in 1622, writing about the local Moravians, stated that: "the people are inclined more to the enemy and the Wallachians". Vlachs raided the Habsburg holdings of Malenovice, Zlín, and Valašské Meziříčí. Wallenstein stated that the Vlachs fought as a “horde” and Vlach forces were victorious against the Habsburgs during the initial years of the war. During portions of these initial years Protestant Hungarians made common cause with the Vlachs, and by 1621 Vlachs controlled all of Moravia east of the Morava River. Hungarian forces, however, were defeated by the Habsburgs at Olomouc in late 1621 and withdrew from Moravia in 1622. Vlach forces were subsequently subdued in 1623, accompanied by a series of public executions.

Renewed Vlach attacks on Vsetín occurred in late 1623. The Hungarians, now aided by the Ottomans, reentered the war, and fighting occurred as far west as Brno. However, the Vlachs did not join their former allies. A second peace between Hungary and the Habsburgs was signed in 1624. The Habsburgs seized this opportunity to attack the Vlachs in March 1624 in the mountains west of Vsetín, but the Vlachs prevailed in what was described as a "slaughter" of Habsburg forces. Vlachs captured Lukov in 1626, and joined by Danes, who had entered the war against the Habsburgs, also captured Hranice in 1626.

In 1627, Wallenstein’s counter-attack forced the withdrawal of the Danish army, under Ernst von Mansfeld and Johann Ernst of Saxe-Weimar from Moravia and sent the Vlachs into retreat. By 1630, Vlachs controlled only their Carpathian strongholds. The final Vlach uprising occurred in 1642, when the Swedes invaded Moravia, under Lennart Torstensson to do battle with the Habsburgs. Combined Vlach-Swede forces won back portions of Moravia, but then the Swedes withdrew in 1643 to concentrate on a war with Denmark.

In January 1644, a massive Habsburg raid was conducted against the Vlachs in the mountains east of Vsetín, The Habsburg victory was completed by this time with a battle that culminated in the burning of Vlach villages (e.g. Hovězí, Huslenky, Halenkov, and Zděchov), disarming of the Vlachs, destruction of the fields and livestock, and an estimated 20 percent of the males of Vsetín were killed or later executed. Vlachs who fled the area were pursued by the Habsburgs as far as into Hungary. Ultimately, about one third of the total Vlach population was killed. With the Conscription of Valašsko on February 16, 1644, a complete registration of the remaining Vlachs occurred. Execution or oath of allegiance to Habsburg and conversion to Catholicism were the choices. Many Vlachs were executed during the infamous executions of 1644 in Vsetín.

== See also ==
- Peasant uprising in Podhale (1630–1633)
- Kostka-Napierski uprising
- Peasant rebellion in Podhale (1669–1670)
- List of rebellions in the Habsburg monarchy

== Sources ==
- Josef V. Polišenský (1971). The Thirty Years War. University of California Press. pp. 55, 120–121, 147, 151–159, 170–172, 179, 184–186, 206, 226, 250, 282, 285, 290. ISBN 978-0-520-01868-6.
