= Peasant uprising in Podhale (1630–1633) =

Peasant revolt against Mikołaj Komorowski

The Peasant Uprising in Podhale (1630–1633) was a peasant revolt against Mikołaj Komorowski, who managed the Nowy Targ estates in Poland. Unrest in Podhale began as early as 1625 and escalated into an open armed conflict by 1630, lasting until 1633. The largest battle of the uprising, the first battle of Nowy Targ, took place in 1631. The leader of the uprising was Stanisław Łętowski, and the insurgents even proclaimed the Republic of Nowy Targ. The uprising was eventually suppressed by noble and royal forces.

== Background of the uprising ==
The conditions of serfs under the Crown of the Kingdom of Poland system were highly unfavorable. In both noble and ecclesiastical estates, mass peasant flight became common. Peasants who fled these estates often moved to crown lands, or sought refuge in forests, mountains, and other inaccessible areas, often turning to brigandage. In the Podhale region, conflicts between peasants and the manor were further exacerbated by the behavior of the local landowner, Mikołaj Komorowski. According to contemporary written sources, such as peasant trial records, Komorowski displayed provocative and dismissive behavior toward his subjects, and enacted several burdensome policies. Komorowski forced village leaders to pay the same hiberna (a type of tax) as their communities, stripped villagers of judicial rights, seized properties, persecuted resistance leaders, compelled peasants to use the manor's taverns and mills, demanded unpaid labor not stipulated in decrees, including on religious holidays, beat those who resisted, increased feudal burdens, forcibly settled Vlach shepherds to impose obligations on them, and took better fields from peasants. He did not hesitate to imprison or even torture peasants.

== Uprising ==
The unrest in Podhale began in 1625, a year after Komorowski took over Nowy Targ (formerly a semi-autonomous royal town). By 1630, it had escalated into an open armed conflict, which lasted until 1633. The largest battle of this uprising occurred in 1631, known as the First Battle of Nowy Targ. The leader of the uprising was Stanisław Łętowski.

Adam Przyboś described the situation as follows:

Initially, from 1625, the struggle took place through legal and judicial means. Over time, the peasants began to flee to Orava and Silesia, joining bandits and attacking estates and manor officials. In November 1630, they conspired and took up arms with drums and banners, organizing themselves militarily, burning mills and inns, destroying crops, and setting ambushes for Komorowski and his men. It was a formal uprising. The peasant expedition to Nowy Targ failed because the townspeople remained loyal to Komorowski and repelled the peasants. However, Komorowski had to leave the land, and the peasants declared an undefined Republic of Nowy Targ. Komorowski was forced to call for regular army help in May 1631, consisting of four banners with cannons. The ensuing battle ended in a victory for the army. Despite this, peasant resistance continued until the death of the starosta in 1633. The peasants declared: ‘We do not want the starosta as our lord, and we would rather all be killed than have him as our lord, and we will not allow him to the land, for we no longer trust this deceiver'.

The uprising was suppressed by noble forces, but motivation among the population waned after the death of the despised Mikołaj Komorowski in 1633.

== Aftermath ==
Unrest in Podhale returned, as seen in the Kostka-Napierski uprising in 1651 (with Łętowski as one of the leaders) and the uprising in 1669–1670.

== See also ==
- Kostka-Napierski uprising
- Vlach uprisings in Moravia
