= Peasant rebellion in Podhale (1669–1670) =

The Peasant rebellion in Podhale (1669–1670) was a rebellion of rural Gorals of the region of Podhale in present day southern Poland and a few villages in present day northern Slovakia against the high taxes imposed on them by the government of the Polish–Lithuanian Commonwealth. It resulted in the defeat of the rebels and end of the Podhale Republic.

In the Polish–Lithuanian Commonwealth, the Gorals of Podhale frequently opposed local authorities, high taxes and the rule of the nobility: the best known of these revolts was the Kostka-Napierski Uprising, which took place in 1651.

In late September 1669, a heavy cavalry unit of Jan Wielopolski (see Towarzysz pancerny, Choragiew (military unit)) came to Podhale to winter in the region. By December, the cavalrymen had found their lodgings in the area of Nowy Targ: according to the legal regulations, local residents were obliged to provide food to the soldiers and their officers. Jan Wielopolski sent his envoys to the Podhale villages to collect the food and tax money. In response, the residents of Czarny Dunajec and Dzianisz attacked Wielopolski’s men, disarmed them, beat them up and robbed them. The envoys were then taken to Nowy Targ, where the locals tried to explain their actions to the officers of the unit. Wielopolski ordered the arrest of the peasants’ envoys, which resulted in widespread anger among the Gorals. Several hundred peasants approached Nowy Targ, but no skirmish took place.

When authorities in Kraków found out about the riots, they decided to pacify the rebellion, so that it would not spread over to other regions. On 6 April 1670 Crown Hetman Jan Sobieski sent seven units (total of 1000 men), consisting mostly of foreign soldiers, to end the rebellion. Meanwhile the rebels had made thorough preparations for the expected action. They even created their own artillery, and divided their forces into several subunits. Apart from military preparations, the gorals sent a letter to King Michal Korybut Wisniowiecki, in which they explained their reasons.

In May 1670, Sobieski’s forces clashed with the rebels near Nowy Targ. The exact date of the battle is unknown, but it happened most likely between 1 and 3 May 1670. Rebel forces were located around the city, to protect local villages and their residents. The skirmish did not last long, as experienced and well-armed Crown units managed to destroy the rebels. Survivors fled to a nearby forest. The battle ended the rebellion.

The rebellion has been remembered alongside the 1630-1633 peasant uprising in Podhale and the Kostka-Napierski uprising as fights for Goral freedom and as the times (1669-1670 and 1630-1633 uprisings) when Gorals were free and ruled themselves, especially by Goral activists like Władysław Orkan.

== See also ==
- Kostka-Napierski Uprising
- Vlach uprisings in Moravia
- Lesko uprising
