= Barwałd Dolny =

- Village
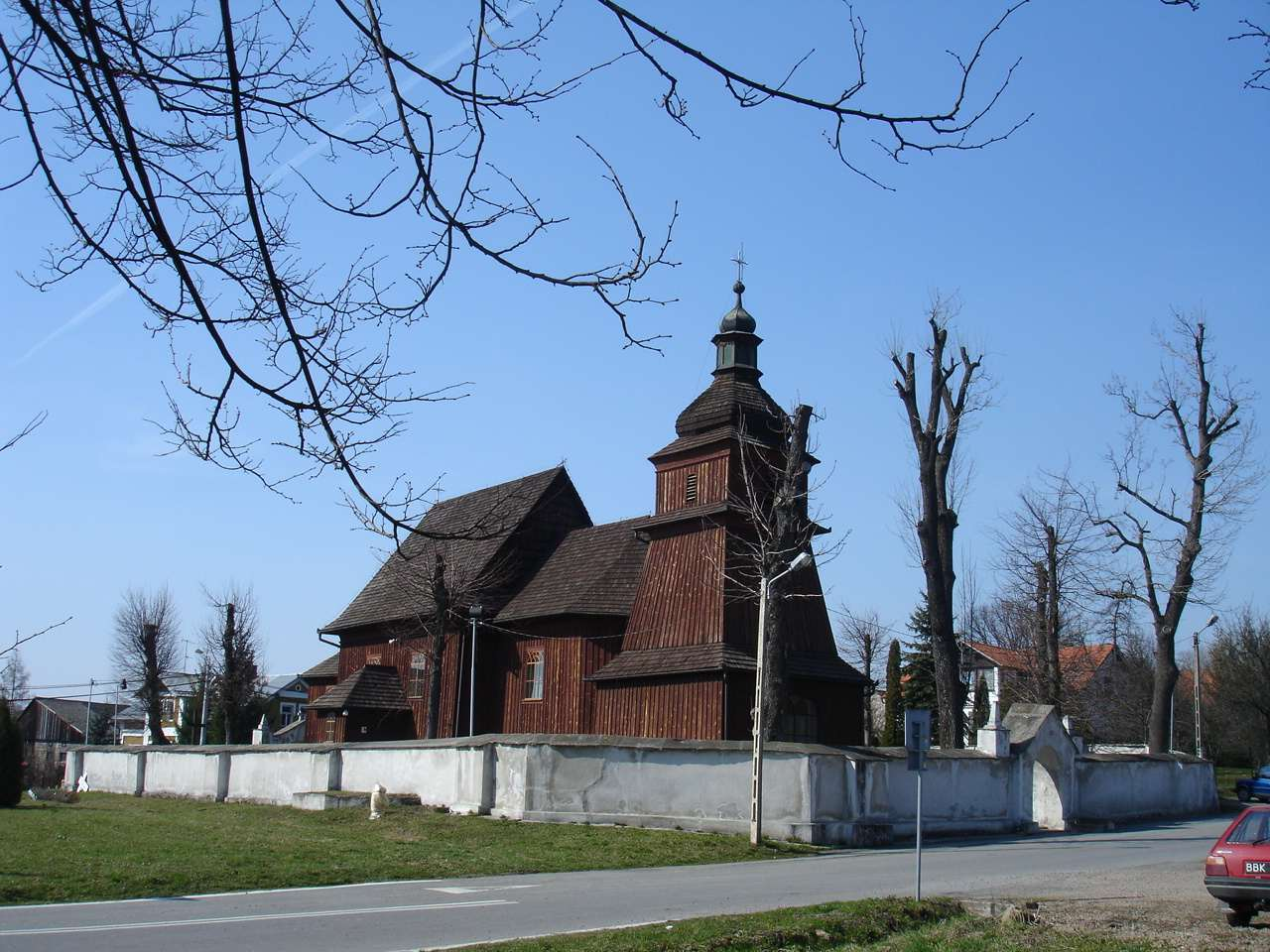
- Saint Erasmus Church

- Location within Poland
- Coordinates: 49°52′N 19°34′E
- Country: Poland
- Voivodeship: Lesser Poland
- County: Wadowice
- Gmina: Wadowice
- Population: 699

Barwałd Dolny (Polish pronunciation: [ˈbarvawd ˈdɔlnɨ]) is a village in the administrative district of Gmina Wadowice, within Wadowice County, Lesser Poland Voivodeship, in southern Poland.
