= Stebník =

- Municipality
- Flag

- Location of Stebník in the Prešov Region Location of Stebník in Slovakia
- Coordinates: 49.38°N 21.27°E
- Country: Slovakia
- Region: Prešov Region
- District: Bardejov District
- First mentioned: 1414

Area
  - Total: 20.53 km^{2} (7.93 sq mi)
- Elevation: 377 m (1,237 ft)

Population (2025)
  - Total: 301
- Time zone: UTC+1 (CET)
  - Summer (DST): UTC+2 (CEST)
- Postal code: 863 3
- Area code: +421 54
- Vehicle registration plate (until 2022): BJ
- Website: www.stebnik.sk

Stebník (Rusyn: Стебник, Hungarian: Esztebnek) is a village and municipality in the Bardejov District in the Prešov Region of northeast Slovakia.

== History ==
In historical records, the village was first mentioned in 1414.

== Geography ==
The municipality lies at an altitude of 377 metres (1,237 ft) and covers an area of 20.53 km^{2} (7.93 sq mi) (2025).

== Population ==
Population statistic (10 years)
Year	1995	2005	2015	2025
Count	356	334	293	301
Difference		−6.17%	−12.27%	+2.73%

Population statistic
Year	2024	2025
Count	303	301
Difference		−0.66%

It has a population of 301 people (31 December 2025).

=== Ethnicity ===
Census 2021 (1+ %)
Ethnicity	Number	Fraction
Slovak	285	93.44%
Rusyn	114	37.37%
Total	305	

In year 2021 was 305 people by ethnicity 285 as Slovak, 114 as Rusyn, 3 as Ukrainian, 2 as Czech and 2 as Polish.

Note on population: The difference values of population numbers in the table "Population statistic" and in the sections "Ethnicity" & "Religion" is caused by the use of various statistical methods.

=== Religion ===
Census 2021 (1+ %)
Religion	Number	Fraction
Greek Catholic Church	205	67.21%
Roman Catholic Church	62	20.33%
None	23	7.54%
Evangelical Church	8	2.62%
Eastern Orthodox Church	6	1.97%
Total	305	

In year 2021 was 305 people by religion 205 from Greek Catholic Church, 62 from Roman Catholic Church, 23 from None, 8 from Evangelical Church, 6 from Eastern Orthodox Church and 1 from Ad hoc movements.
