= Podhale w ogniu =

1956 film by Jan Batory

- Directed by: Jan Batory and Henryk Hechtkoph
- Written by: Jan Batory and Henryk Hechtkoph
- Produced by: Stanisław Zylewicz
- Cinematography: Adolf Forbert
- Music by: Ryszard Bukowski
- Production company: Wytwórnia Filmów Fabularnych
- Release date: 25 January 1956
- Running time: 105 minutes
- Language: Polish

Podhale w ogniu (Podhale on fire) is a Polish historical film about the Kostka-Napierski uprising. It was released in 1956.
