= Wacław Krzeptowski =

Polish politician

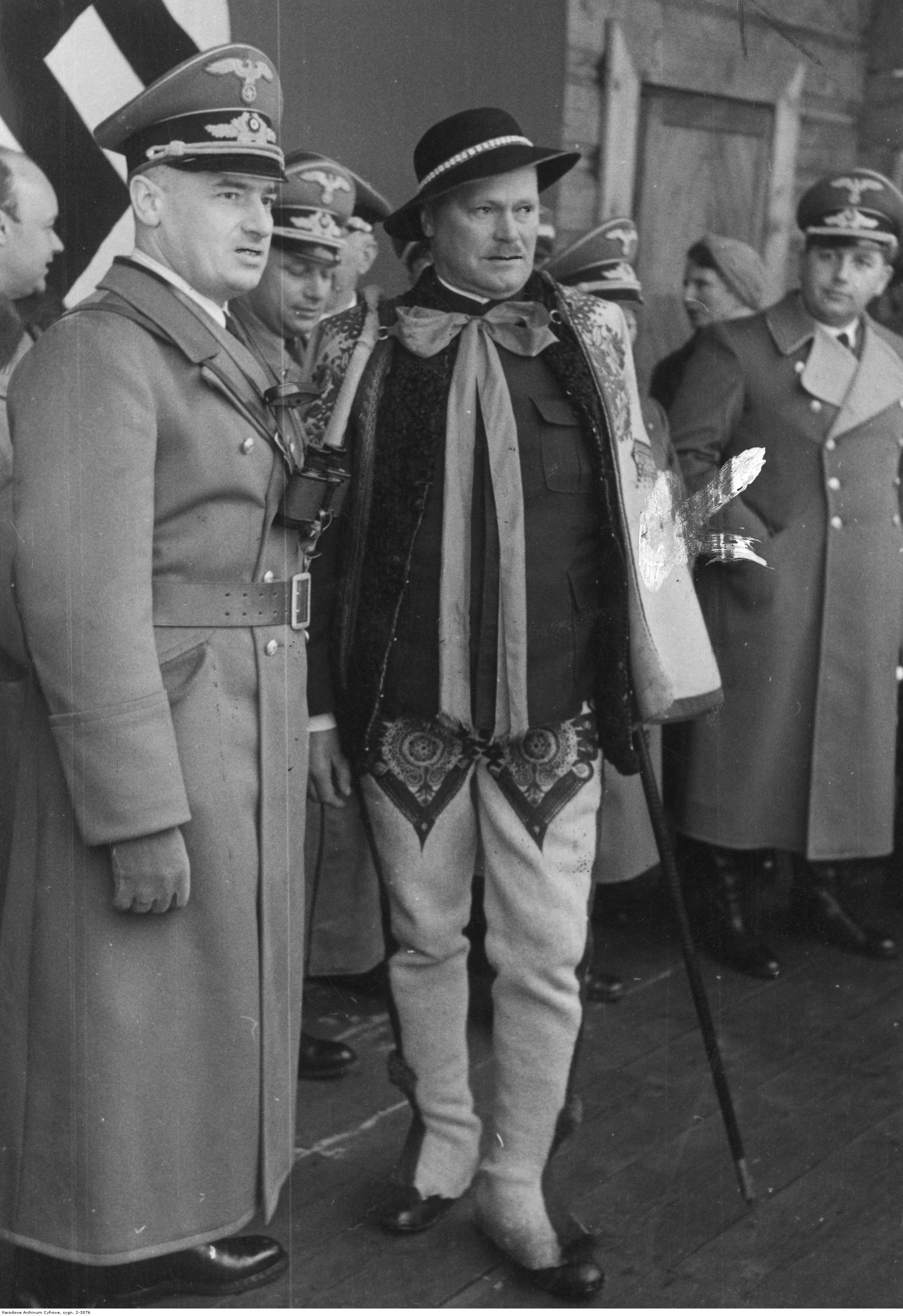
- Krzeptowski (center) with Hans Frank (left)
- Born: 24 June 1897; Kościelisko, Galicia (Austrian Poland)
- Died: 20 January 1945 (aged 47); Zakopane, Poland
- Occupations: Leader of the Goralenvolk, chairman of the People's Party in Nowy Targ, Nazi collaborator
- Status: Executed by hanging
- Conviction: Treason
- Penalty: Death

Wacław Krzeptowski (24 June 1897 – 20 January 1945) was one of the leaders of the Goralenvolk action in Podhale during World War II. Before the German occupation he was chairman of the People's Party (SL) in Nowy Targ. In the early years of the war – as self-proclaimed Goralenführer – Krzeptowski lobbied Hans Frank in favor of his plan to establish an independent state for his ethnic group in southern Poland. This project proved to be a failure due to lack of support among the local population.

During the German-Soviet war, Krzeptowski tried to recruit volunteers for his "Goralen legion" (also referred to as Goralische Division SS) to fight alongside the Axis powers. The attempt ended in a complete fiasco as out of the initial 300 able bodied recruits (from the entire Podhale region) all but twelve deserted within a short time or were sent to concentration camps by the Germans for insubordination. At the end of the war, he refused to flee to Germany and instead hid out in the Tatry mountains of his native region. In December 1944 he was tracked down and captured by the Home Army. He was tried for treason and executed by hanging.

== See also ==
- Goralenvolk
- Józef Cukier
- Henryk Szatkowski

== Notes and references ==
- Magazine "Wiedza i Zycie, Inne Oblicza Histori", No. 07, February 2005.
