= Hardiness zone =

Region defined by minimum temperature relevant to the plant survival

A hardiness zone is a geographic area defined as having a certain average annual minimum temperature, a factor relevant to the survival of many plants. In some systems other statistics are included in the calculations. The original and most widely used system, developed by the United States Department of Agriculture (USDA) as a rough guide for landscaping and gardening, defines 13 zones by long-term average annual extreme minimum temperatures. It has been adapted by and to other countries (such as Canada) in various forms. A plant may be described as "hardy to zone 10": this means that the plant can withstand a minimum temperature of −1.1 to 4.4 °C (30 to 40 °F).

Unless otherwise specified, in American contexts "hardiness zone" or simply "zone" usually refers to the USDA scale. However, some confusion can exist in discussing buildings and HVAC, where "climate zone" can refer to the International Energy Conservation Code zones, where Zone 1 is warm and Zone 8 is cold.

Other hardiness rating schemes have been developed as well, such as the UK Royal Horticultural Society and US Sunset Western Garden Book systems. A heat zone (see below) is instead defined by annual high temperatures; the American Horticultural Society (AHS) heat zones use the average number of days per year when the temperature exceeds 30 °C (86 °F).

A plant's survival depends on factors other than its hardiness, including the amount of sunlight, rainfall, humidity, and frequency of snow cover, among other conditions. Trees and greenery foliage may provide dappled or full shade and they can act as wind breaks, as do greenhouses without artificial climate control. As a result, microclimates are created where some plants may unexpectedly thrive.

== United States hardiness zones (USDA scale) ==
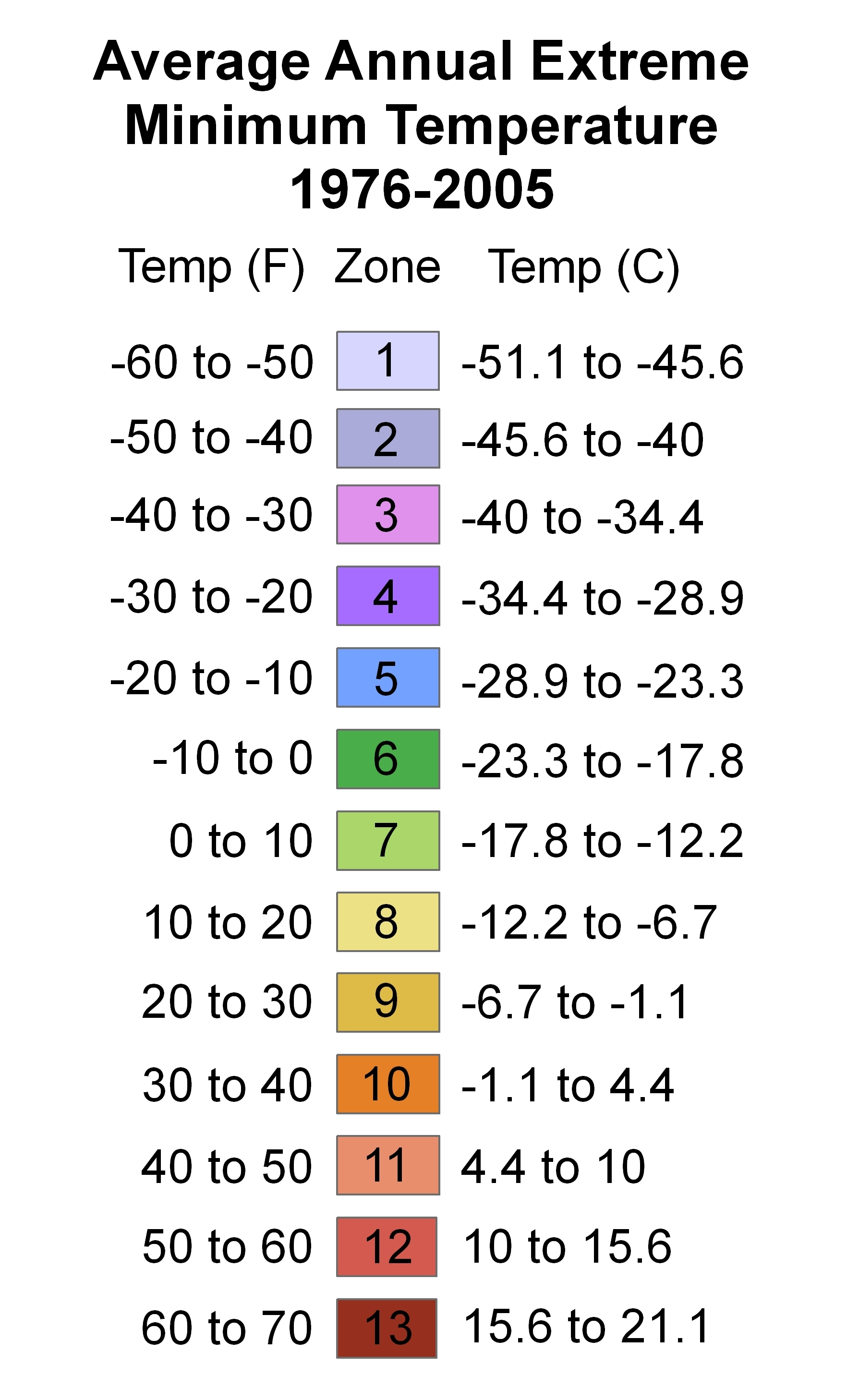
Temperature scale used to define USDA hardiness zones. These are annual extreme minima (an area is assigned to a zone by taking the lowest temperature recorded there in a given year). As shown, the USDA uses a GIS dataset averaged over 1976 to 2005 for its United States maps.

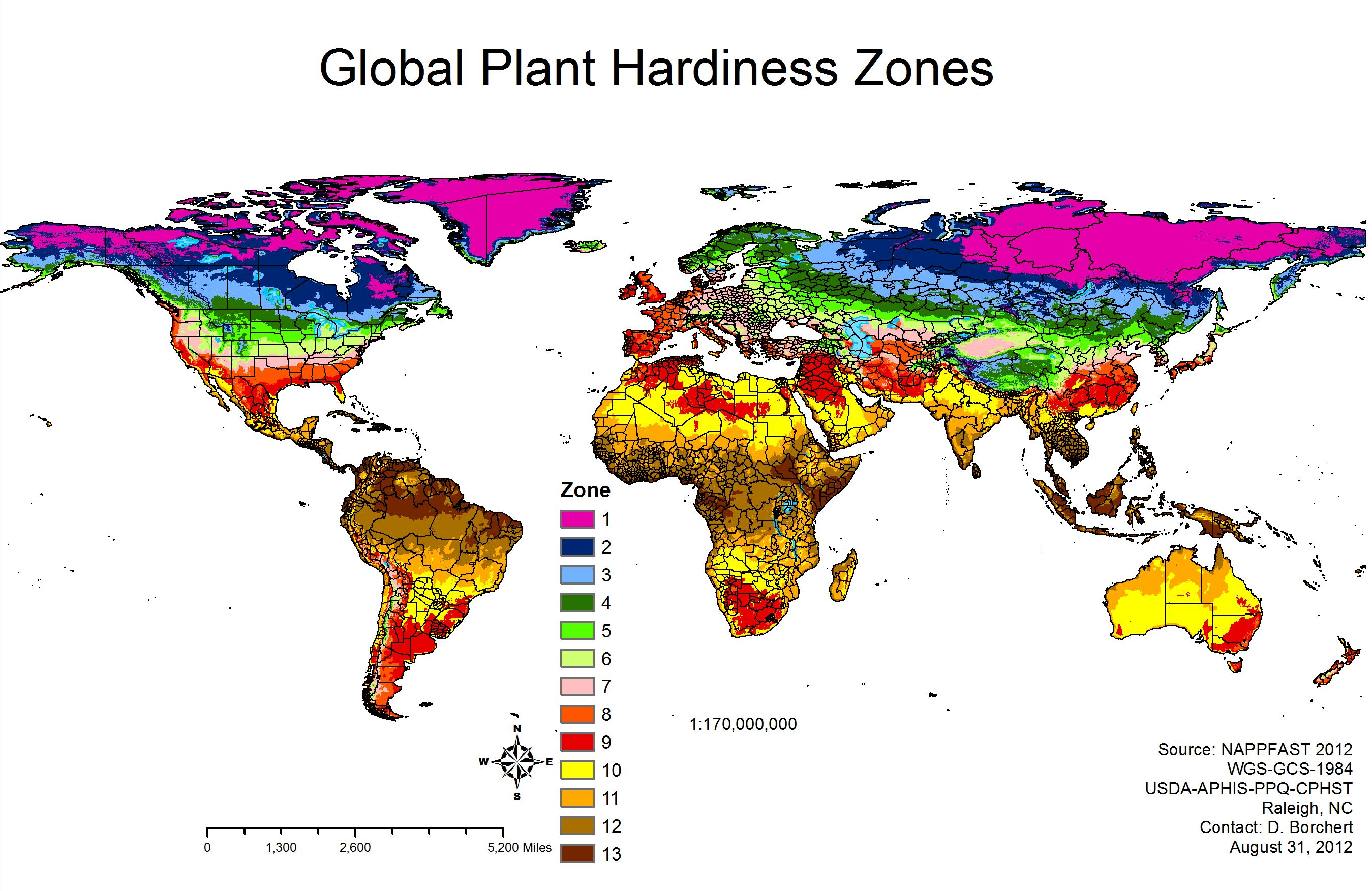
Global Plant Hardiness Zones (approximate). Antarctica is not shown; most of it except the peninsula is zone 0 or 1, and is almost completely covered by the Antarctic ice sheet.

The USDA system was originally developed to aid gardeners and landscapers in the United States. In the United States, most of the warmer zones (zones 9, 10, and 11) are located in the deep southern half of the country, on the southern coastal margins, and on the Pacific coast.

Higher zones can be found in Hawaii (up to 12) and Puerto Rico (up to 13). The southern middle portion of the mainland and central coastal areas are in the middle zones (zones 8, 7, and 6). The far northern portion on the central interior of the mainland have some of the coldest zones (zones 5, 4, and small area of zone 3) and often have much less consistent range of temperatures in winter due to being more continental, especially further west with higher diurnal temperature variations, and thus the zone map has its limitations in these areas. Lower zones can be found in Alaska (down to 1). The low latitude and often stable weather in Florida, the Gulf Coast, and southern Arizona and California, are responsible for the rarity of episodes of severe cold relative to normal in those areas. The warmest zone in the 48 contiguous states is the Florida Keys (11b) and the coldest is in north-central Minnesota (2b).

A couple of locations on the northern coast of Puerto Rico have the warmest hardiness zone in the United States at 13b. Conversely, isolated inland areas of Alaska have the coldest hardiness zone in the United States at 1a.

=== Definitions ===
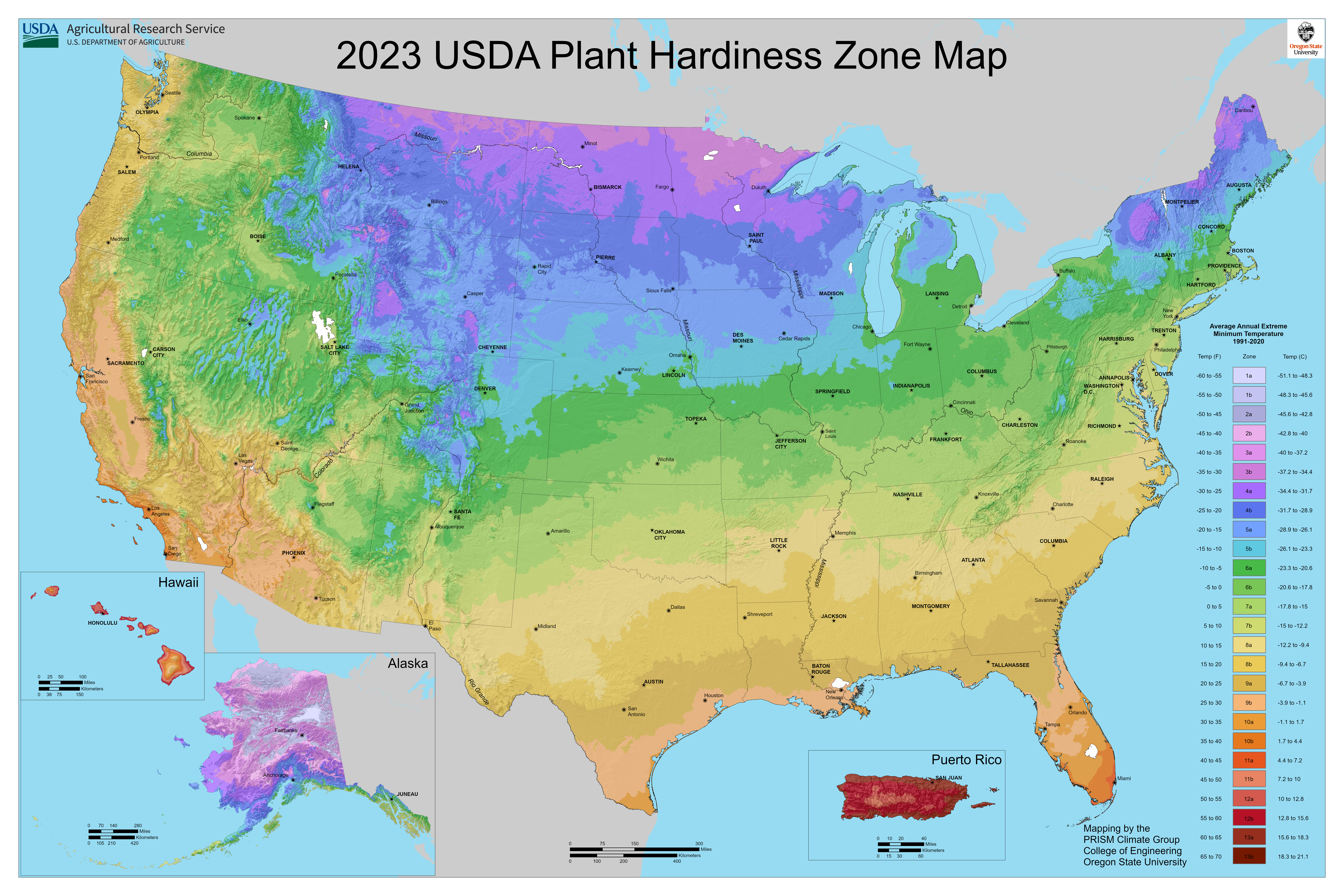
2023 update of the USDA Plant Hardiness Zone Map

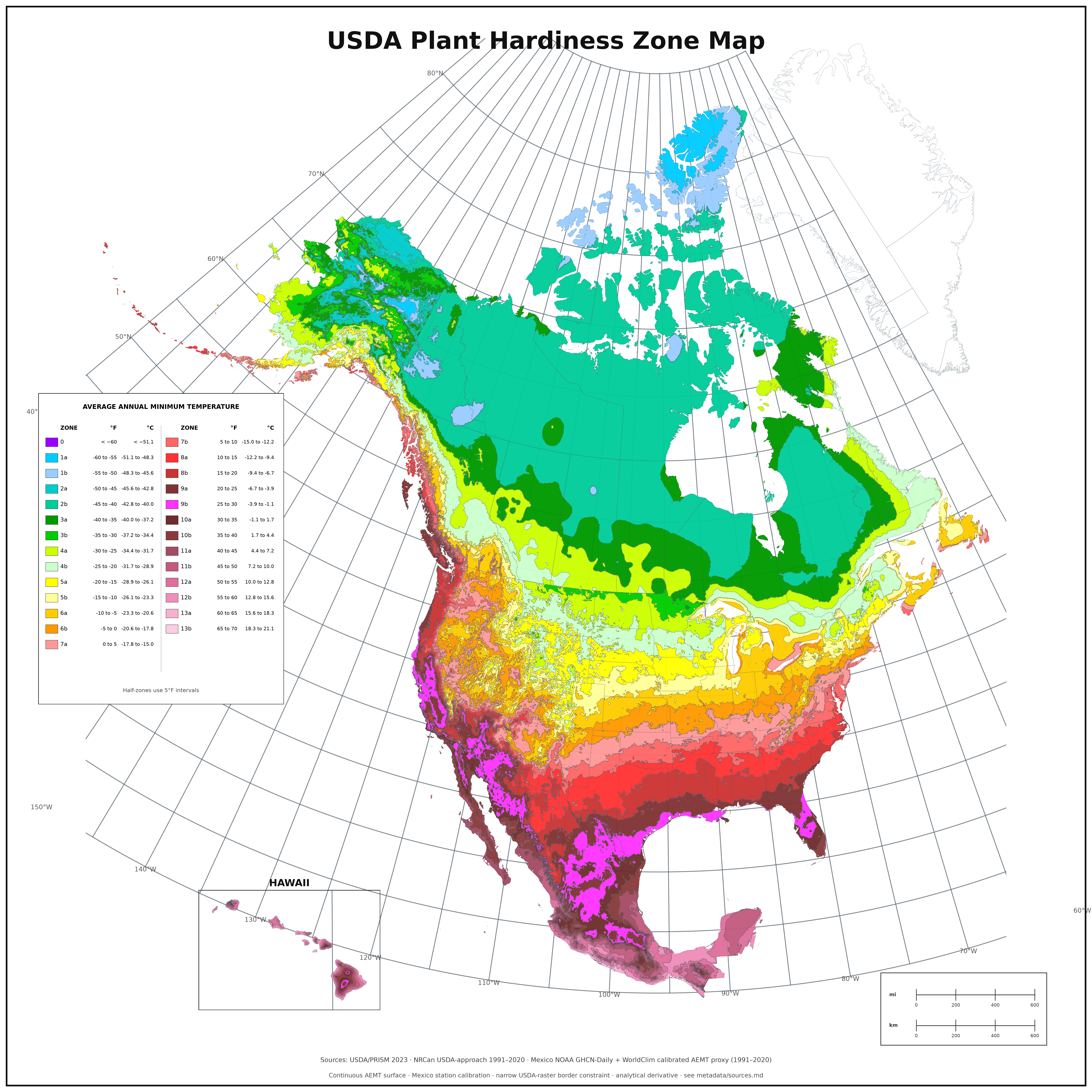
USDA plant hardiness zone map of North America

Zone		From	To
0	a	< −65 °F (−53.9 °C)	
0	b	−65 °F (−53.9 °C)	−60 °F (−51.1 °C)
1	a	−60 °F (−51.1 °C)	−55 °F (−48.3 °C)
1	b	−55 °F (−48.3 °C)	−50 °F (−45.6 °C)
2	a	−50 °F (−45.6 °C)	−45 °F (−42.8 °C)
2	b	−45 °F (−42.8 °C)	−40 °F (−40 °C)
3	a	−40 °F (−40 °C)	−35 °F (−37.2 °C)
3	b	−35 °F (−37.2 °C)	−30 °F (−34.4 °C)
4	a	−30 °F (−34.4 °C)	−25 °F (−31.7 °C)
4	b	−25 °F (−31.7 °C)	−20 °F (−28.9 °C)
5	a	−20 °F (−28.9 °C)	−15 °F (−26.1 °C)
5	b	−15 °F (−26.1 °C)	−10 °F (−23.3 °C)
6	a	−10 °F (−23.3 °C)	−5 °F (−20.6 °C)
6	b	−5 °F (−20.6 °C)	0 °F (−17.8 °C)
7	a	0 °F (−17.8 °C)	5 °F (−15 °C)
7	b	5 °F (−15 °C)	10 °F (−12.2 °C)
8	a	10 °F (−12.2 °C)	15 °F (−9.4 °C)
8	b	15 °F (−9.4 °C)	20 °F (−6.7 °C)
9	a	20 °F (−6.7 °C)	25 °F (−3.9 °C)
9	b	25 °F (−3.9 °C)	30 °F (−1.1 °C)
10	a	30 °F (−1.1 °C)	35 °F (1.7 °C)
10	b	35 °F (1.7 °C)	40 °F (4.4 °C)
11	a	40 °F (4.4 °C)	45 °F (7.2 °C)
11	b	45 °F (7.2 °C)	50 °F (10 °C)
12	a	50 °F (10 °C)	55 °F (12.8 °C)
12	b	55 °F (12.8 °C)	60 °F (15.6 °C)
13	a	60 °F (15.6 °C)	65 °F (18.3 °C)
13	b	> 65 °F (18.3 °C)	

=== History ===
The first attempts to create a geographical hardiness zone system were undertaken by two researchers at the Arnold Arboretum in Boston; the first was published in 1927 by Alfred Rehder, and the second by Donald Wyman in 1938. The Arnold map was subsequently updated in 1951, 1967, and finally 1971, but eventually fell out of use completely.

The modern USDA system began at the US National Arboretum in Washington. The first map was issued in 1960, and revised in 1965. It used uniform 10 °F (5.6 °C) ranges, and gradually became widespread among American gardeners.

The USDA map was revised and reissued in 1990 with freshly available climate data, this time with five-degree distinctions dividing each zone into new "a" and "b" subdivisions.

In 2003, the American Horticultural Society (AHS) produced a draft revised map, using temperature data collected from July 1986 to March 2002. The 2003 map placed many areas approximately a half-zone higher (warmer) than the USDA's 1990 map. Reviewers noted the map zones appeared to be closer to the original USDA 1960 map in its overall zone delineations. Their map purported to show finer detail, for example, reflecting urban heat islands by showing the downtown areas of several cities (e.g., Baltimore, Maryland; Washington, D.C., and Atlantic City, New Jersey) as a full zone warmer than outlying areas. The map excluded the detailed a/b half-zones introduced in the USDA's 1990 map, an omission widely criticized by horticulturists and gardeners due to the coarseness of the resulting map. The USDA rejected the AHS 2003 draft map and created its own map in an interactive computer format, which the American Horticultural Society now uses.

In 2006, the Arbor Day Foundation released an update of U.S. hardiness zones, using mostly the same data as the AHS. It revised hardiness zones, reflecting generally warmer recent temperatures in many parts of the country, and appeared similar to the AHS 2003 draft. The Foundation also did away with the more detailed a/b half-zone delineations.

In 2012 the USDA updated their plant hardiness map based on 1976–2005 weather data, using a longer period of data to smooth out year-to-year weather fluctuations. Two new zones (12 and 13) were added to better define and improve information sharing on tropical and semitropical plants, they also appear on the maps of Hawaii and Puerto Rico. There is a very small spot east of San Juan, Puerto Rico, that includes the airport in coastal Carolina, where the mean minimum is 67 degrees F (19 C), which is classified as hardiness Zone 13b, the highest category, with temperatures rarely below 65 °F (18 °C). The map has a higher resolution than previous editions, and is able to show local variations due to factors such as elevation or large bodies of water. Many zone boundaries were changed as a result of the more recent data, as well as new mapping methods and additional information gathered. Many areas were a half-zone warmer than the previous 1990 map. The 2012 map was created digitally for the internet, and includes a ZIP Code zone finder and an interactive map.

In 2015, the Arbor Day Foundation revised another map, also with no a and b subdivisions, showing many areas having zones even warmer, with the most notable changes in the Mid Atlantic and Northeast, showing cities like Philadelphia, New York City and Washington D.C. in zone 8, due to their urban heat islands.

In November 2023, the USDA released another updated version of their plant hardiness map, based on 1991–2020 weather data across the United States. The updated map shows continued northward movement of hardiness zones, reflecting a continued warming trend in the United States' climate.

=== Selected U.S. cities ===
The USDA plant hardiness zones for selected U.S. cities as based on the 2023 map are the following:

City	Zone
Albuquerque, New Mexico	7b/8a
Anchorage, Alaska	5a/5b
Atlanta, Georgia	8a/8b
Austin, Texas	9a
Baltimore, Maryland	7b/8a
Birmingham, Alabama	8a/8b
Boise, Idaho	7a/7b
Boston, Massachusetts	6b/7a
Buffalo, New York	6b
Charlotte, North Carolina	8a
Chicago, Illinois	6a/6b
Cincinnati, Ohio	6b
Cleveland, Ohio	6b/7a
Colorado Springs, Colorado	5b/6a
Columbus, Ohio	6b
Dallas, Texas	8b
Denver, Colorado	6a
Detroit, Michigan	6b
El Paso, Texas	8b/9a
Fairbanks, Alaska	2a
Fort Worth, Texas	8b
Fresno, California	9b
Greensboro, North Carolina	8a
Hartford, Connecticut	6b/7a
Honolulu, Hawaii	12b
Houston, Texas	9b
Indianapolis, Indiana	6a/6b
Jacksonville, Florida	9a/9b
Kansas City, Missouri	6b/7a
Las Vegas, Nevada	9a/9b
Los Angeles, California	10a/10b
Louisville, Kentucky	7a
Memphis, Tennessee	8a
Miami, Florida	11a
Milwaukee, Wisconsin	5b/6a
Minneapolis, Minnesota	5a
Nashville, Tennessee	7b
New Orleans, Louisiana	9b
New York, New York	7b
Oklahoma City, Oklahoma	7b
Omaha, Nebraska	5b/6a
Orlando, Florida	10a
Philadelphia, Pennsylvania	7b
Pittsburgh, Pennsylvania	6b/7a
Phoenix, Arizona	9b/10a
Portland, Oregon	8b/9a
Raleigh, North Carolina	8a
Reno, Nevada	7a/7b
Sacramento, California	9b
Salt Lake City, Utah	7a/7b
San Antonio, Texas	9a
San Diego, California	10b/11a
San Francisco, California	10a/10b
San Jose, California	9b/10a
San Juan, Puerto Rico	13a/13b
Seattle, Washington	9a
St. Louis, Missouri	7a
Tampa, Florida	10a
Tucson, Arizona	9a/9b
Tulsa, Oklahoma	7b
Virginia Beach, Virginia	8a/8b
Washington, D.C.	7b/8a
Wichita, Kansas	7a

=== Limitations ===
As the USDA system is based entirely on average annual extreme minimum temperature in an area, it is limited in its ability to describe the climatic conditions a gardener may have to account for in a particular area: there are many other factors that determine whether or not a given plant can survive in a given zone.

Zone information alone is often not adequate for predicting winter survival, since factors such as frost dates and frequency of snow cover can vary widely between regions. Even the extreme minimum itself may not be useful when comparing regions in widely different climate zones. As an extreme example, due to the Gulf Stream most of the United Kingdom is in zones 8–9, while in the US, zones 8–9 include regions such as the subtropical coastal areas of the southeastern US and Mojave and Chihuahuan inland deserts, thus an American gardener in such an area may only have to plan for several nights of cold temperatures per year, while their British counterpart may have to plan for several months.

In addition, the zones do not incorporate any information about duration of cold temperatures, summer temperatures, or sun intensity insolation; thus sites which may have the same mean winter minima on the few coldest nights and be in the same garden zone, but have markedly different climates. For example, zone 8 covers coastal, high latitude, cool summer locations like Seattle and London, as well as lower latitude, hot-summer climates like Charleston and Madrid. Farmers, gardeners, and landscapers in the former two must plan for entirely different growing conditions from those in the latter, in terms of length of hot weather and sun intensity. Coastal Ireland and central Florida are both Zone 10, but have radically different climates.

The hardiness scales do not take into account the reliability of snow cover in the colder zones. Snow acts as an insulator against extreme cold, protecting the root system of hibernating plants. If the snow cover is reliable, the actual temperature to which the roots are exposed will not be as low as the hardiness zone number would indicate. As an example, Quebec City in Canada is located in zone 4, but can rely on a significant snow cover every year, making it possible to cultivate plants normally rated for zones 5 or 6. But, in Montreal, located to the southwest in zone 5, it is sometimes difficult to cultivate plants adapted to the zone because of the unreliable snow cover.

Many plants may survive in a locality but will not flower if the day length is insufficient or if they require vernalization (a particular duration of low temperature).

There are many other climate parameters that a farmer, gardener, or landscaper may need to take into account as well, such as humidity, precipitation, storms, rainy-dry cycles or monsoons, and site considerations such as soil type, soil drainage and water retention, water table, tilt towards or away from the sun, natural or humanmade protection from excessive sun, snow, frost, and wind, etc. The annual extreme minimum temperature is a useful indicator, but ultimately only one factor among many for plant growth and survival.

=== Effects of climate change ===
The USDA map published in 2012 shows that most of the US has become a half zone (2.8 °C or 5 °F) hotter in winter compared to the 1990 release. Again, with the publication of the 2023 map, about half of the US has shifted a half zone warmer. Research in 2016 suggests that USDA plant hardiness zones will shift even further northward under climate change.

=== Alternatives ===
An alternative means of describing plant hardiness is to use "indicator plants". In this method, common plants with known limits to their range are used.

Sunset publishes a series that breaks up climate zones more finely than the USDA zones, identifying 45 distinct zones in the US, incorporating ranges of temperatures in all seasons, precipitation, wind patterns, elevation, and length and structure of the growing season.

In addition, the Köppen climate classification system can be used as a more general guide to growing conditions when considering large areas of the Earth's surface or attempting to make comparisons between different continents. The Trewartha climate classification is often a good "real world" concept of climates and their relation to plants and their average growing conditions.

== American Horticultural Society heat zones ==
In addition to the USDA Hardiness zones there are American Horticultural Society (AHS) heat zones.

The criterion is the average number of days per year when the temperature exceeds 30 °C (86 °F). The AHS Heat Zone Map for the US is available on the American Horticultural Society website.

Zone	From	To
1	< 1	
2	1	7
3	8	14
4	15	30
5	31	45
6	46	60
7	61	90
8	91	120
9	121	150
10	151	180
11	181	210
12	>210	

== Australian hardiness zones ==
The Australian National Botanic Gardens have devised another system keeping with Australian conditions. The zones are defined by steps of 5 degrees Celsius, from –15 to –10 °C for zone 1 to 15–20 °C for zone 7. They are numerically about 6 lower than the USDA system. For example, Australian zone 3 is roughly equivalent to USDA zone 9. The higher Australian zone numbers had no US equivalents prior to the 2012 addition by USDA of zones 12 and 13.

The spread of weather stations may be insufficient and too many places with different climates are lumped together. Only 738 Australian stations have records of more than ten years (one station per 98,491 hectares or 243,380 acres), though more populated areas have relatively fewer hectares per station. Mount Isa has three climatic stations with more than a ten-year record. One is in zone 4a, one in zone 4b, and the other is in zone 5a. Sydney residents are split between zones 3a and 4b. Different locations in the same city are suitable for different plants.

== Canadian hardiness zones ==
Climate variables that reflect the capacity and detriments to plant growth are used to develop an index that is mapped to Canada's Plant Hardiness Zones. This index comes from a formula originally developed by Ouellet and Sherk in the mid-1960s.

The formula used is: Y = –67.62 + 1.734X_{1} + 0.1868X_{2} + 69.77X_{3} + 1.256X_{4}+ 0.006119X_{5} + 22.37X_{6} – 0.01832X_{7}

where:

- Y = estimated index of suitability
- X_{1} = monthly mean of the daily minimum temperatures (°C) of the coldest month
- X_{2} = mean frost free period above 0 °C in days
- X_{3} = amount of rainfall (R) from June to November, inclusive, in terms of R/(R+a) where a=25.4 if R is in millimeters and a=1 if R is in inches
- X_{4} = monthly mean of the daily maximum temperatures (°C) of the warmest month
- X_{5} = winter factor expressed in terms of (0 °C – X_{1})Rjan where Rjan represents the rainfall in January expressed in mm
- X_{6} = mean maximum snow depth in terms of S/(S+a) where a=25.4 if S is in millimeters and a=1 if S is in inches
- X_{7} = maximum wind gust in (km/h) in 30 years.

City	Canadian Zone	USDA Zone
Calgary	4a	4a
Edmonton	4a	3b
Halifax	6b	6a
Montreal	6a	4b
Ottawa	5b	4b
Saskatoon	3b	3a
St. John's	6a	7a
Toronto	7a	5b
Vancouver	8b	8b
Victoria	9a	9a
Winnipeg	4a	3b
Yellowknife	0a	2a

For practical purposes, Canada has adopted the American hardiness zone classification system. The 1990 version of the USDA Plant Hardiness Zone Map included Canada and Mexico, but they were removed with the 2012 update to focus on the United States and Puerto Rico. The Canadian government publishes both Canadian and USDA-style zone maps.

== European hardiness zones ==
=== Selected European cities ===
The table below provides USDA hardiness zone data for selected European cities:

City	Zone
Amsterdam, Netherlands	8b
Barcelona, Spain	10a
Belgrade, Serbia	7b/8a
Bratislava, Slovakia	7b/8a
Bucharest, Romania	7a/7b
Catania, Italy	10b
Dublin, Ireland	8b/9a
Edinburgh, Scotland, UK	8a/8b
Glasgow, Scotland, UK	8b
Helsinki, Finland	6b
Kaliningrad, Russia	6b/7a
Kraków, Poland	7a
Lisbon, Portugal	10b
London, England	8b/9a
Ljubljana, Slovenia	7b
Madrid, Spain	9a
Manchester, England	8b
Milan, Italy	9a
Moscow, Russia	5a
Paris, France	8b/9a
Portsmouth, England	9a
Prague, Czech Republic	7b
Riga, Latvia	6b
Rome, Italy	10a
Rovaniemi, Finland	4a
Sarajevo, Bosnia and Herzegovina	7a/7b
Simferopol, Ukraine	6b
Sochi, Russia	9a
Stockholm, Sweden	7a/7b
Tallinn, Estonia	6a/6b
Tuapse, Russia	8b
Trondheim, Norway	7b
Valencia, Spain	10a
Vienna, Austria	7b/8a
Vorkuta, Russia	2a/2b
Warsaw, Poland	6b
Zurich, Switzerland	7b/8a
Antwerp, Belgium	8a
Belfast, Northern Ireland	8b/9a
Berlin, Germany	7a
Birmingham, England	8b
Cardiff, Wales	8b/9a
Copenhagen, Denmark	8a/8b
Düsseldorf, Germany	8a
Funchal, Portugal	11b
Gdańsk, Poland	7a
Hamburg, Germany	8a
Istanbul, Turkey	8b/9a
La Coruña, Spain	10b
Lampedusa, Italy	12b
Las Palmas, Spain	12b
Marseille, France	9a/9b
Minsk, Belarus	5a
Munich, Germany	6b
Murmansk, Russia	4a
Newcastle, England, UK	8a/8b
Nicosia, Cyprus	9b
Oslo, Norway	7a
Palermo, Italy	11b
Plymouth, England, UK	9a/9b
Porto, Portugal	10a
Poznań, Poland	6b
Reykjavík, Iceland	7b/8a
Saint Petersburg, Russia	5a
Simrishamn, Sweden	8a
Sofia, Bulgaria	6b/7a
Strasbourg, France	8a
Thessaloniki, Greece	8b/9a
Tromsø, Norway	7a/7b
Umeå, Sweden	5a/5b
Valletta, Malta	10b
Vilnius, Lithuania	5b/6a
Wroclaw, Poland	6b
Zagreb, Croatia	7b/8a
Yalta, Ukraine	9a

=== Britain and Ireland ===
USDA zones do not work particularly well in Ireland and Great Britain as they are designed for continental climates and subtropical climates. The high latitude, weaker solar intensity, and cooler summers must be considered when comparing to US equivalent. New growth may be insufficient or fail to harden off affecting winter survival in the shorter and much cooler summers of Ireland and Britain.

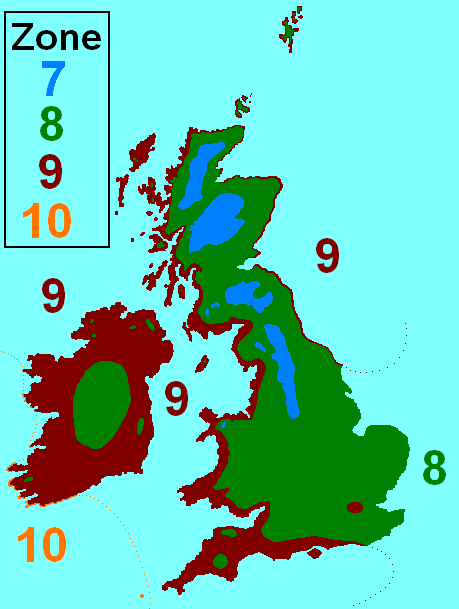
Britain and Ireland's hardiness zones, USDA scale, 2006

Owing to the moderating effect of the North Atlantic Current on the Irish and British temperate maritime climate, Britain, and Ireland even more so, have milder winters than their northerly position would otherwise afford. This means that the USDA hardiness zones relevant to Britain and Ireland are quite high, from 7 to 10, as shown below.

7. In Scotland the Grampians, Northwest Highlands and locally in the Southern Uplands; in England the Pennines; and in Wales the highest part of Snowdonia.
8. Most of England, Wales and Scotland, parts of central Ireland, and Snaefell on the Isle of Man.
9. Most of western and southern England and Wales, western Scotland, also a very narrow coastal fringe on the east coast of Scotland and northeast England (within 5 km (3.1 mi) of the North Sea), London, the West Midlands Urban Area, most of Ireland, and most of the Isle of Man.
10. Very low-lying coastal areas of the southwest of Ireland and the Isles of Scilly.

In 2012 the United Kingdom's Royal Horticultural Society introduced new hardiness ratings for plants, not places. These run from H7, the hardiest (tolerant of temperatures below −20 °C (−4 °F)) to H1a (needing temperatures above 15 °C (59 °F)). The RHS hardiness ratings are based on absolute minimum winter temperatures (in °C) rather than the long-term average annual extreme minimum temperatures that define USDA zones.

=== Scandinavia and Baltic Sea Region ===
Scandinavia lies at the same latitude as Alaska or Greenland, but the effect of the warm North Atlantic Current is even more pronounced here than it is in Britain and Ireland. Save for a very small spot around Karasjok Municipality, Norway, which is in zone 2, nowhere in the Arctic part of Scandinavia gets below zone 3. The Faroe Islands, at 62–63°N are in zone 8, as are the outer Lofoten Islands at 68°N. Tromsø, a coastal city in Norway at 70°N, is in zone 7, and even Longyearbyen, the northernmost true city in the world at 78°N, is still in zone 4. All these coastal locations have one thing in common, though, which are cool, damp summers, with temperatures rarely exceeding 20 °C (68 °F), or 15 °C (59 °F) in Longyearbyen. This shows the importance of taking heat zones into account for better understanding of what may or may not grow. Milder parts of western Norway are in zone 9, and Sarpsborg south of Oslo at 59°N with more continental summers are in zone 8. Inland it gets colder in winter, Hamar at 61°N is in zone 6 and Røros further north is zone 4.

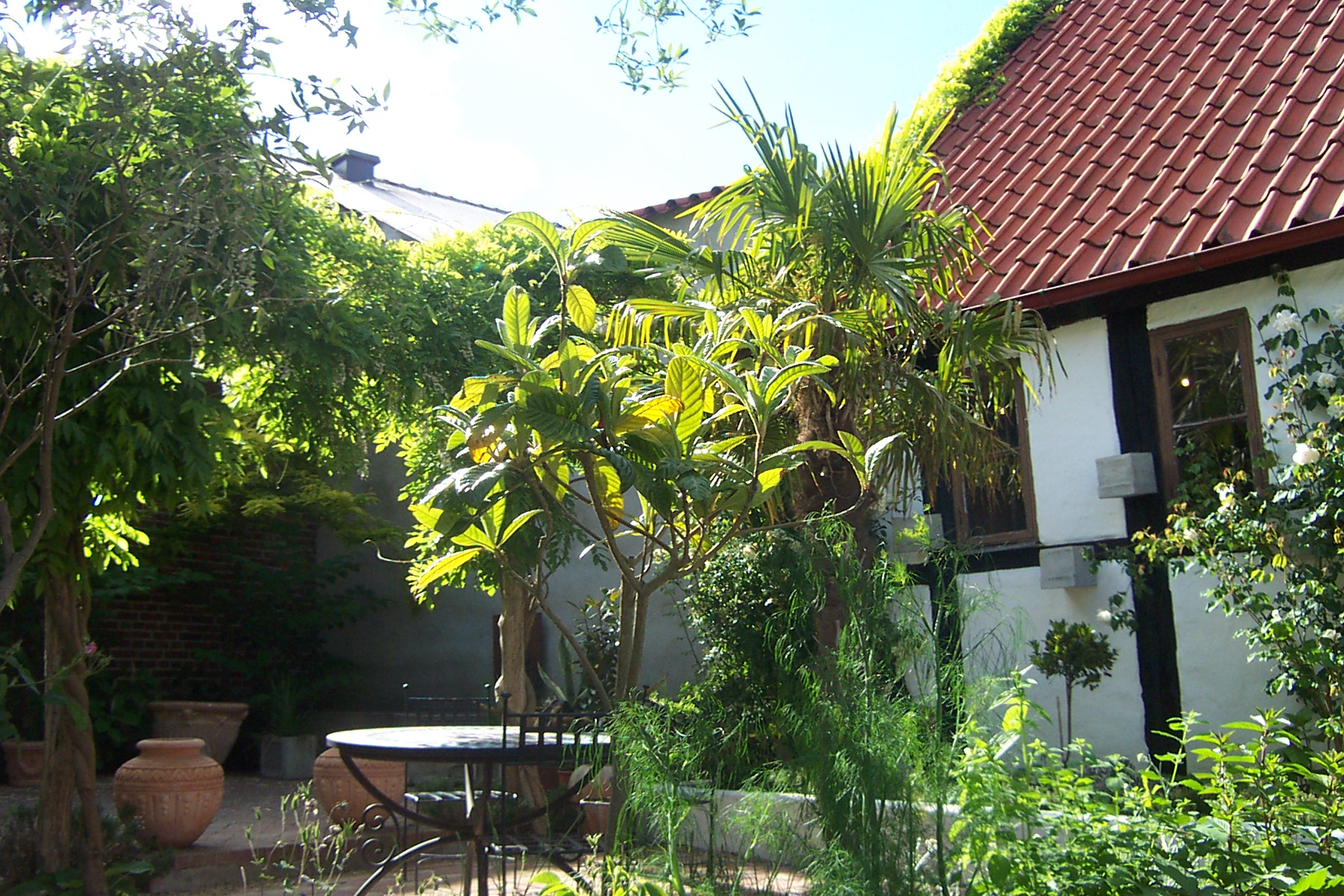
A garden in Simrishamn, southern Sweden.

In Sweden and Finland generally, at sea level to 500 metres (1,600 ft), zone 3 is north of the Arctic Circle, including cities like Karesuando and Pajala. Kiruna is the major exception here, which being located on a hill above frost traps, is in zone 5. Zone 4 lies between the Arctic Circle and about 64–66°N, with cities such as Oulu, Rovaniemi and Jokkmokk, zone 5 (south to 61–62°N) contains cities such as Tampere, Umeå, and Östersund. Zone 6 covers the south of mainland Finland, Sweden north of 60°N, and the high plateau of Småland further south. Here one will find cities such as Gävle, Örebro, Sundsvall, and Helsinki. Åland, as well as coastal southern Sweden, and the Stockholm area are in zone 7. The west coast of Sweden (Gothenburg and southwards) enjoys particularly mild winters and lies in zone 7, therefore being friendly to some hardy exotic species (found, for example, in the Gothenburg Botanical Garden), the southeast coast of Sweden has a colder winter due to the absence of the Gulf Stream.

=== Central Europe ===
Hardiness zones of Europe and surrounding regions 1 2 3 4 5 6 7 8 9 10 11

Central Europe is a good example of a transition from an oceanic climate to a continental climate, which reflects in the tendency of the hardiness zones to decrease mainly eastwards instead of northwards. Also, the plateaus and low mountain ranges in this region have a significant impact on how cold it might get during winter. Generally speaking, the hardiness zones are high considering the latitude of the region, although not as high as Northern Europe with the Shetland Islands where zone 9 extends to over 60°N.

In Central Europe, the relevant zones decrease from zone 8 on the Belgian, Dutch, and German North Sea coast, with the exception of some of the Frisian Islands (notably Vlieland and Terschelling), the island of Helgoland, and some of the islands in the Rhine-Scheldt estuary, which are in zone 9, to zone 5 around Suwałki, Podlachia on the far eastern border between Poland and Lithuania. Some isolated, high elevation areas of the Alps and Carpathians may even go down to zone 3 or 4.

An extreme example of a cold sink is Funtensee, Bavaria which is at least in zone 3. Another notable example is Waksmund, a small village in the Polish Carpathians, which regularly reaches −35 °C (−31 °F) during winter on calm nights when cold and heavy airmasses from the surrounding Gorce and Tatra Mountains descend down the slopes to this low-lying valley, creating extremes which can be up to 10 °C (18 °F) colder than nearby Nowy Targ or Białka Tatrzańska, which are both higher up in elevation. Waksmund is in zone 3b while nearby Kraków, only 80 km (50 mi) to the north and 300 m (980 ft) lower is in zone 6a. These examples prove that local topography can have a pronounced effect on temperature and thus on what is possible to grow in a specific region.

=== Southern Europe ===
The southern European marker plant for climate as well as cultural indicator is the olive tree, which cannot withstand long periods below freezing so its cultivation area matches the cool winter zone. The Mediterranean Sea acts as a temperature regulator, so this area is generally warmer than other parts of the continent; except in mountainous areas where the sea effect lowers, it belongs in zones 8–10; however, southern Balkans (mountainous Western and Eastern Serbia, continental Croatia, and Bulgaria) are colder in winter and are in zones 6–7. The Balkan area is also more prone to cold snaps and episodes of unseasonable warmth. For instance, despite having similar daily means and temperature amplitudes to Nantucket, Massachusetts, for each month, Sarajevo has recorded below-freezing temperatures in every month of the year.

The Croatian (Dalmatian) coast, Albania, and northern Greece are in zones 8–9, as are central-northern Italy (hills and some spots in Po Valley are however colder) and southern France; Central Iberia is 8–9 (some highland areas are slightly colder). The Spanish and Portuguese Atlantic coast, much of Andalusia and Murcia, coastal and slightly inland southern Valencian Community, a part of coastal Catalonia, the Balearic Islands, southwestern Sardinia, most of Sicily, coastal southern Italy, some areas around Albania, coastal Cyprus and southwestern Greece are in zone 10.

In Europe, the zone 11a is limited only to a few spots. In the Iberian Peninsula, it can be found on the southern coast, in small Spanish areas inside the provinces of Almería, Cádiz, Granada, Málaga and Murcia. In Portugal, zone 11a can be found in the Southwest on a few unpopulated sites around the municipalities of Lagos and Vila do Bispo. In mainland Greece, zone 11a can be found in Monemvasia and also in areas of Crete, the Dodecanese, Cyclades and some Argo-Saronic Gulf islands. The Mediterranean islands of Malta, Lampedusa and Linosa belong to zone 11a as well as a few areas on the southernmost coast of Cyprus.

== Macaronesia ==
Macaronesia consists of four archipelagos: The Azores, the Canary Islands, Cape Verde and Madeira. At lower altitudes and coastal areas, the Portuguese Azores and Madeira belong to zones 10b/11b and 11a/11b respectively. The Azores range from 9a to 11b and Madeira ranges from 9b to 12a, 9a and 9b found inland on the highest altitudes such as Mount Pico in the Azores or Pico Ruivo in Madeira. The Spanish Canary Islands hardiness zones range from 8a to 12b depending on the location and the altitude. The islands are generally part of zones 11b/12a in lower altitudes and coastal areas, reaching up to 12b in the southernmost coasts or populated coastal parts such as the city of Las Palmas. The lowest hardiness areas are found in Teide National Park being at 8a/8b for its very high altitude. At 3,715 m, Teide peak is the highest peak of Macaronesia.

The Cape Verde islands, located much further south inside the tropics, have hardiness zones that range from 12 to 13 in the coastal areas, while the lowest hardiness zone is found in the island of Fogo, in the country's highest peak Pico do Fogo.

== South Africa ==
South Africa has five horticultural or climatic zones. The zones are defined by minimum temperature.

== See also ==
- Agriculture
- Gardening
- Geographical zone
- Hardiness (plants)
- Subtropics
