= Edward Gött-Getyński =

Major of Artillery in the Polish Army and underground resistance fighter

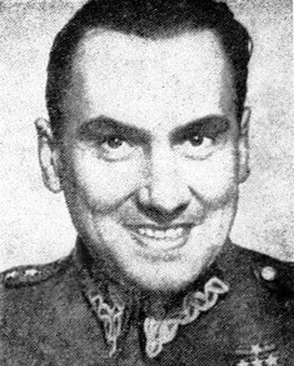
- Born: January 4, 1898; Brody, Kingdom of Galicia and Lodomeria, Austria-Hungary
- Died: January 25, 1943 (aged 45); Auschwitz-Birkenau, German-occupied Poland
- Other names: Nom-de-guerre Sosnowiecki
- Occupation: Army Major
- Known for: Underground Mountain Division at Tatra Confederation

Major Edward Karol Gött-Getyński, or Get-Getyński nom-de-guerre Sosnowiecki (January 4, 1898 – January 25, 1943) was a Major of Artillery in the Polish Army during the interwar period, and the underground resistance fighter during the Nazi German occupation of Poland. He was shot dead at the Auschwitz concentration camp following the discovery of his clandestine work.

== Military service ==
Gött-Getyński came from Brody in the partitioned Poland. As an army officer, he took part in the defense of Lwów 1918-1919 (wounded twice) and the Polish–Soviet War (1919–1921, also wounded twice). In 1928, he served with the 6th Heavy Artillery Regiment in Lwów (now Lviv, Ukraine), and four years later, with the Headquarters of the 23 Infantry Division from Upper Silesia in Katowice. His last military post before World War II was Squadron Commander at the Volyn Cadet School for Artillery Reserve Officers (Wołyńska Szkoła Podchorążych Rezerwy Artylerii) in Włodzimierz Wołyński. Immediately before the German attack on Poland, he was drafted into the Pomerania Army Staff of Gen. Władysław Bortnowski.

== Work in the resistance ==
Getyński was one of the leaders of the Polish resistance movement in World War II. In 1940–1941 he took part in the sabotage of railway networks utilised by the advancing German forces. In mid 1941 Getyński organized the first combat unit of the Tatra Confederation called Mountain Division (Dywizja Górska) in Podhale, under the leadership of Augustyn Suski from the Confederation. His underground work ended at the beginning of 1942 with the arrest of Tatra leaders resulting from infiltration by the Gestapo agent SS-Oberscharführer Heinz Wegner (a.k.a. Stanisław Wegner-Romanowski). Major Get-Getynski was arrested on 2 February 1942 and taken to Auschwitz (prisoner # 29693) where despite torture and suffering he committed himself to leading underground activities against the Germans. As a result of this he faced a firing squad and was executed on 25 January 1943.

== See also ==
- Ciołek coat of arms
