= Józef Cukier =

Goralenvolk leader (1889-1960)

Józef Cukier (14 November 1889, Zakopane – 22 April 1960, Zakopane) was one of the leaders of the Goralenvolk during World War II. Having been a president of the Highlander Union before the German invasion, he tried along with Wacław Krzeptowski to establish an independent state for his ethnic group by collaborating with the occupiers. The attempt failed due to lack of support among the local population. After the war, he was sentenced to 15 years in prison for collaboration.
