= Tadeusz Popek =

Polish partisan and underground activist (1915-1942)

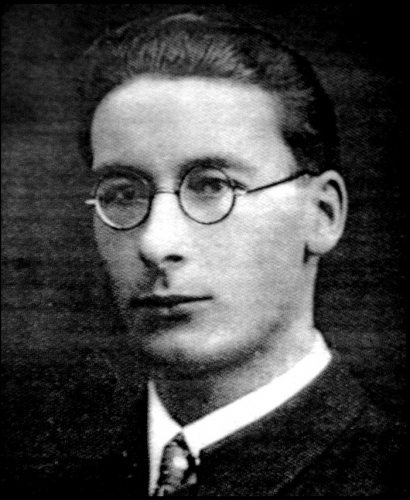
- Born: 2 November 1915; Chodenice district of Bochnia
- Died: 17 September 1942 (aged 26); Zakopane
- Other name: Nom-de-guerre Wacław Tatar
- Known for: Underground Tatra Confederation

Tadeusz Popek (2 November 1915 – 17 September 1942) was a Polish partisan and underground activist during World War II. During the German occupation of Podhale, Popek (nom-de-guerre Wacław Tatar, or Hak) became the co-founder of the Polish resistance organization called the Tatra Confederation (Polish: Konfederacja Tatrzańska), a.k.a. Confederation of the Tatra Mountains, operating in the Nowy Targ area. He was in charge of clandestine publications including Der Freie Deutsche meant for the Wehrmacht. Popek died in Zakopane, executed by a firing squad in the courtyard of the infamous Palace Hotel.

== Biography ==
Popek was born in Chodenice in Lesser Poland. In 1938 he graduated from the philology department of the Jagiellonian University (UJ) in Kraków. Soon after the Nazi occupation of Poland, he was active in sabotaging the railroad tracks near Bochnia, and then moved with his mother Aniela to Łopuszna for their safety. From there, they went to Nowy Targ, where Popek obtained a position as a clerk at the office of Nazi Kriminalpolizei near the town centre, and began collecting classified information for the Polish underground.

In May 1941, Popek met Augustyn Suski, another graduate of UJ working for the resistance. Together, they created the clandestine Tatra Confederation, with Jadwiga Apostoł (nom-de-guerre Barbara Spytkowska) as their administrative secretary. The purpose of the Tatra Confederation was to oppose the implementation of the Goralenvolk action by Germany, aimed at the germanization of the Polish highlanders. However, his underground work ended in late January 1942 as a result of the infiltration of their group by the Gestapo agent and former acquaintance, Hainz Wegner-Romanowski. Popek was arrested and interrogated, tortured and taken to an execution centre at the Palace Hotel in Zakopane (dubbed the "Death's Head Resort" by the locals). Two days later, along with his co-conspirator Jan Dzielski, he spotted an unlocked window at the second-floor prisoner washstand. On 2 February 1942 the two jumped out into the back-alley and ran in opposite directions. Popek and Dzielski are the only two prisoners known to have escaped from the Palace. The Gestapo set a 10,000 zloty reward for Popek's arrest.

Popek was turned in by a traitor while hiding deep in the Gorce Mountains, and re-captured on 22 August 1942. He was brought back to the Palace Hotel. Many Germans stopped to get a glimpse of this "dangerous" fugitive. He was taken around various locations as living proof of the effectiveness of Nazi intelligence. Chained by his hands and legs to a wall in the cellar, Popek was tortured for a month. He did not disclose anything, and was executed in the courtyard of the Palace Hotel by a firing squad on 17 September 1942. His mother, Aniela Popek, was sent to Auschwitz, where she was murdered in April 1943. The body of Tadeusz Popek was exhumed by the Polish communist authorities in 1946 as evidence during the court case of Goralenvolk leaders, and re-buried in Zakopane, at the Nowotarska Street cemetery.
