= Witalis Wieder =

German-Polish collaborator and Nazi sympathizer (1895-1967)

Witalis Karol Teodor Wieder (29 March 1895 – 22 February 1967) was a German-Polish collaborator, a Nazi sympathizer, a recruited Agent of the Abwehr, and a self-proclaimed leader of the Goralenvolk during World War II. He was a former officer in the Polish army. Wieder acted as a Reichsdeutscher, and was known collaborator. At the end of the war, he escaped to Germany.

== Sources ==
- Alfons Filar, U podnóża Tatr 1939–1945. Podhale i Sądecczyzna w walce z okupantem, Warszawa 1985.
- Ryszard Kaczmarek, Polacy w Wehrmachcie, Wydawnictwo Literackie, Kraków 2010.
- Rudolf Klimek, Ludobójcza akcja Goralenvolk, Zakopane 2006.
- Bartłomiej Kuraś, Paweł Smoleński, Krzyżyk Niespodziany. Czas Goralenvolk, Wydawnictwo Czarne 2017.
- Wojciech Szatkowski, Goralenvolk. Historia zdrady, Kanon 2012.
