= Tatra Confederation =

Polish resistance organization

The Tatra Confederation (Polish: Konfederacja Tatrzańska), or Confederation of the Tatra Mountains, was a Polish resistance organization operating in the southernmost Podhale region during the Nazi German occupation of Poland. The Tatra Confederation was founded in May 1941 in Nowy Targ – the historical capital of Podhale, by the poet and partisan, Augustyn Suski (nom-de-guerre Stefan Borusa); with Tadeusz Popek as his deputy. The organization had its ideological roots in the peasant movement of the Goral Lands of interwar Poland.

== Wartime activities ==
During the German occupation, the clandestine group had about 400–500 members. The main geographical area of its activity was the city of Nowy Targ itself and the village of Waksmund in the same county. At the end of summer 1941 the first combat unit of the Tatra Confederation was established, named Mountain Division (Dywizja Górska) led by Major Edward Gött-Getyński (nom-de-guerre Sosnowiecki). The unit never became a division contrary to the intentions of its organizers; it consisted of about a few dozen guerrillas at its peak. Its main defence area and military base were the Gorce Mountains – part of the Western Beskids, and the vicinity of Turbacz Mountain in the same range.

Konfederacja Tatrzańska published an underground newsletter in German, with a monthly circulation of about 100 copies, called Der Freie Deutsche, meant for the occupiers. It was edited by Aleksander Stromenger from Poznań as well as Bernard Mróz, and printed under heavy guard at the remote house of the Wincenty Apostoł family in Nowy Targ. Most articles came from Polish originals submitted by Suski himself. The paper was so well written that the Nazis believed it to be the product of internal saboteurs, and frantically investigated the Wehrmacht, but to no avail. The extent of their investigation became known after the end of the war, during the German court trial of the Gestapo chief from Zakopane, Robert Weisman.

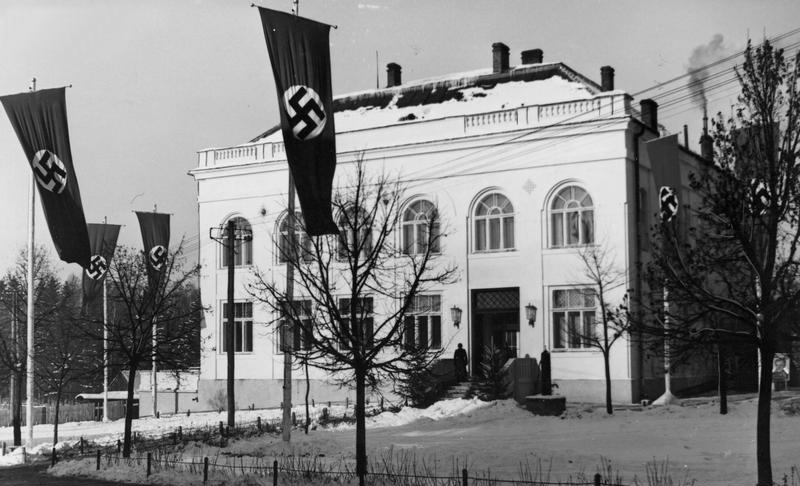
The German Stationhouse in Nowy Targ, Poland, shown decorated with Nazi swastika flags in 1940; one of the prime political targets of clandestine work by the Tatra Confederation

The principal aim of the Tatra Confederation was to oppose the implementation of the Goralenvolk action by Nazi Germany, aimed at germanization of the Polish Gorals. Due to organizational errors however, the Confederation was quickly broken up by the Gestapo. Augustyn Suski was murdered in the Auschwitz-Birkenau concentration camp on 26 May 1942, while Major Edward Gött-Getyński was shot dead in the same camp on 25 January 1943. Other, previously arrested members of the organization, including Tadeusz Popek, were interrogated and tortured at the Gestapo headquarters in Zakopane in the cellars of the Palace Hotel ("Death's Head Resort" – as called by its victims; some 300 Jews, including women and children, were murdered there also). Waksmund village was repeatedly "pacified" for its alleged collaboration with the Tatra Confederation.

== Under Soviet domination ==
The guerrillas of the Mountain Division who survived the wave of arrests joined the Home Army (AK) and fought the Nazis from within the AK structures until the end of war, under the leadership of Lieutenant Józef Kuraś (Orzeł). He changed his pseudonym from Eagle to Fire (Ogień) after the pacification of Waksmund on 29 June 1943, when his family including wife and son were massacred by the Germans. Kuraś was eventually expelled from the Home Army (AK) for insubordination and created his own guerilla unit called Błyskawica.

After liberation, Kuraś turned against the communist authorities including UB and the NKVD in April 1945, once he learned about an arrest warrant issued against him by the supporters of the new Stalinist regime. He committed suicide on 22 February 1947, when his remote hideaway at the village of Ostrowsko was ambushed by the Internal Security Corps special-purpose unit (Korpus Bezpieczeństwa Wewnętrznego, KBW) tipped off by an informant.

The infamous Palace Hotel in Zakopane housed a tuberculosis sanatorium in communist Poland, and a state-run child care centre with qualified staff. Thanks to the efforts of Auschwitz survivors and World War II historians, there was a Museum of Struggle and Martyrdom set up in its basement with a permanent exhibit of the Gestapo headquarters. However, it is now a privately owned guesthouse, and was recently put up for sale. The future of the museum is in doubt. The building may be completely refurbished or torn down, if the local council is unwilling to buy it back from its private owners.
