= Andrzej Waksmundzki =

Polish chemist

Andrzej Waksmundzki (October 3, 1910 – December 14, 1998) was a Polish chemist who became well known for his work in the field of chromatography.

== Biography ==
Andrzej Waksmundzki was born in the village of Waksmund, in Nowy Targ County as the son of a farmer. In 1935 he took his MSc in chemistry at the Jagiellonian University in Kraków, where he presented his PhD thesis in 1939. After the closure of the Jagiellonian University by the Nazis, Dr. Waksmundzki found employment as a teacher of chemistry at the secondary Commercial School in Nowy Targ. Simultaneously Dr. Waksmundzki was involved in the local anti-nazi underground for which he was arrested by the Gestapo in February 1942. The remainder of the war he was imprisoned in Auschwitz, Gross Rosen and Mauthausen concentration camps.

After the war he started organizing academic life in Poland which was effectively destroyed by the Nazi and Soviet occupiers during these years. Dr. Waksmundzki organized the Chair of Physical Chemistry in the Faculty of Natural Sciences at Maria Curie-Skłodowska University in Lublin, he was appointed Professor Extraordinarius in 1950 and Professor Ordinarius ten years later. Between 1967 and 1970 he worked as visiting professor at the university of British Columbia in Vancouver, British Columbia, Canada. During his academic career, Dr. Waksmundzki published at least 353 scientific papers.

Andrzej Waksmundzki has been awarded the Order of Polonia Restituta, three honorary doctorates from the Marie-Curie University, the Lublin School of Medicine and the Technical University of Lublin, as well as two state awards for his achievements in the field of chromatography and for his contribution to the technology of luminophores.

Andrzej Waksmundzki died in Lublin, Poland on December 14, 1998, at the age of 88.
