= Józef Kuraś =

Lieutenant in the Polish Armed Forces

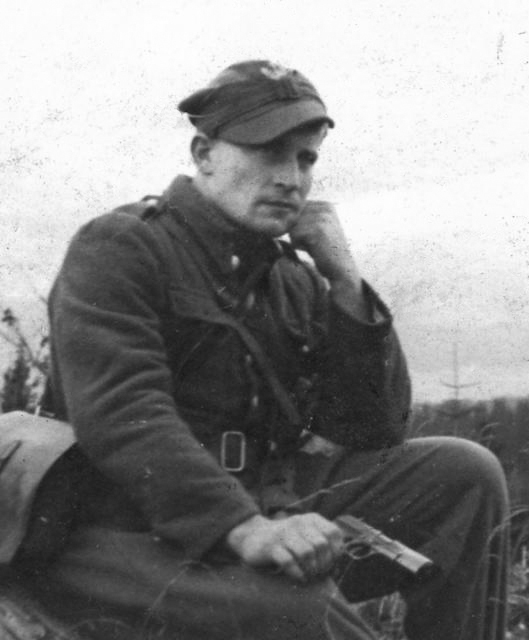
- Józef Kuraś "Ogień"
- Born: 23 October 1915; Waksmund, Poland
- Died: 22 February 1947 (aged 31); Nowy Targ, Polish People's Republic
- Cause of death: Suicide by gunshot
- Military career
- Allegiance: Poland
- Branch: Polish Army
- Rank: Lieutenant
- Conflicts: World War II

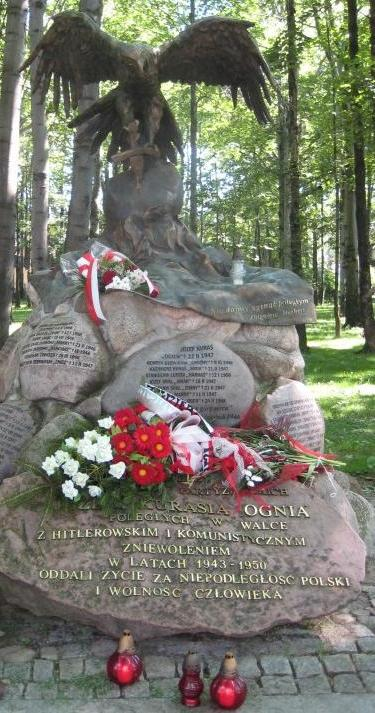
Monument to Kuraś in Zakopane

Józef Kuraś (23 October 1915 – 22 February 1947), noms-de-guerre "Orzeł" (Eagle) and from June 1943 "Ogień" (Fire), was born in Waksmund near Nowy Targ. He served as lieutenant in the Polish Army during the invasion of Poland, and became an underground member of Armia Krajowa and Bataliony Chłopskie in the Podhale region. After the end of World War II, he continued his fight against the Communist authorities and was one of the leaders of the so-called "cursed soldiers".

Kuraś died in Nowy Targ on 22 February 1947 after attempting suicide, having been ambushed at Ostrowsko by units of the Polish secret police. A controversial historical figure, he has been accused of antisemitism and committing war crimes by multiple groups and organisations, including those representing Jewish and Slovak communities in Poland and the Slovak National Memory Institute, and by scholars like Jan T. Gross. This opinion is contradicted by Poland's own equivalent Institute of National Remembrance which paints him as a patriot and freedom fighter. In 2006, the Polish president Lech Kaczyński opened an official memorial in Zakopane, in recognition of his resistance efforts.

Kuraś's reputation is extremely controversial due to evidence implicating him in war crimes against Slovak and Jewish refugees, and letters showing that he advocated for the ethnic cleansing of Jews.

== Early life ==
Józef Kuraś was born in a Goral family. From 1936 until 1938 he served in the Polish army, at first in the 2nd Polish Highland Battalion and then in the Border Protection Corps. On 13 February 1939 he married Elżbieta Chorąży. During the Polish September Campaign, he fought as part of the 2nd Polish Highland Battalion. After the defeat of Poland, he unsuccessfully tried to make his way to Hungary with the hope of joining the Polish army being formed in France. Eventually, he made his way back to his home village where already in November 1939 he joined the anti-Nazi resistance organization Union of Armed Struggle (ZWZ) with a nom de guerre "Orzeł" (Eagle).

== In ZWZ and AK ==
In 1941 "Orzeł" became the leader of a local partisan unit "Konfederacja Tatrzańska" (Tatra Confederation, KT), associated with the pre-war agrarian People's Party (SL). In June 1943, he murdered two plain clothes policemen and in response, on 29 June 1943, the Germans carried out a "pacification" of Waksmund and murdered his father, his wife, his two-year-old son, sent his two brothers to a concentration camp and burned his house. After this, Kuraś changed his pseudonym to "Ogień" (Fire).

In the same year the Gestapo, acting on tips from informants, managed to break up the KT. Those who escaped arrest, including Kuraś ended up joining units of Armia Krajowa, newly formed in the region. At the same time Kuraś kept up his contact with individuals associated with SL.

At the end of December 1943, the Germans, again with help from informants, surprised the partisans and attacked their camp. As a result, two members of the AK were killed. Due to the absence of the local AK leader Krystian Wieckowski "Zawisza", Kuraś, as second in command was in charge. On the initiative of "Zawisza", Kuraś was accused of dereliction of duty and blamed for allowing the attack to happen. Kuraś was found guilty and sentenced to death. Because of support from SL members in the AK the sentence was not carried out and in the summer of 1944 it was rescinded.

However, as a result of this incident, Kuraś left the AK and with a group of close friends joined Bataliony Chłopskie, the underground military arm of SL-Roch.

== In BCh and cooperation with AL ==
At the end of 1944, with full knowledge of SL leadership, Kuraś established contacts and began cooperating with a newly arrived unit of Armia Ludowa (AL) "For A Free Homeland" led by Lt. Isaac Gutman ("Zygfryd") and Soviet partisans. The motivation was twofold. First, joint actions against Germans could be more effective. Second, the agrarians were hoping to be able to introduce their own people into the local government and police once the Soviets arrived (which at the time seemed imminent) and retain at least local control over the region. A similar strategic plan was implemented by the SL in Małopolska. While most of the joint actions carried out by Kuraś and Gutman where directed against the Germans, during this period, Kuraś also took part in operations against his former colleagues from Armia Krajowa whom the Soviets and the AL treated as hostile forces. Partly for this reason, but also because of his earlier 'desertion' from the AK, some former AK veterans still regard Kuraś as little more than a common bandit. As a result, his exhibit is segregated from the rest of the AK at the local museum adjacent to the Church in Szczawa.

In December 1944 he delivered a written declaration to Gutman, proclaiming his allegiance to the Soviet-controlled Polish Committee of National Liberation government and voluntarily came under Gutman's command. From then on until the arrival of the Red Army, Kuraś together with the AL carried out numerous actions against the Germans. On 31 December 1944, together with Soviet partisans, his unit blew up a German train. On 20 January 1945, together with Gutman's unit, he attacked and dispersed a column of German military trucks and finally, on 27 January, Kuraś led several companies of the Red Army through the mountains around Nowy Targ enabling the Soviets to outflank German forces which consequently withdrew without a fight.

== Cooperation with communist authorities ==
Once the Podhale region came under Soviet control, Ogień came out of the mountains and led his men into Nowy Targ where, with approval from Gutman, he transformed his partisans into units of the Citizen's Militia (MO) (roughly, a police force). Shortly after, the communist authorities established the communist Secret Police, Ministry of Public Security of Poland (Urzad Bezpieczenstwa, UB), in the region and Kuraś, again on the recommendation of Gutman, became its commander. He used his position to put his people in key regional government and security posts preemptively in an attempt to retain regional control.

However, it soon became apparent that the SL plan aimed at keeping local control through supporters (like Kuraś) was going to fail, particularly as the Communist authorities began sending their own people from outside the region and putting them in top command posts. He was ordered to report to the Kraków office of the UB. On his way there he was warned by friendly contacts that he was going to be arrested. An alternative version of the story reports that Kuraś himself opened the letters he was charged with delivering to the Kraków WUBP among which he found his own arrest warrant. As a result, after a three-month period as a nominal director of the regional UB, on 11 April 1945, Józef Kuraś once again went "to the mountains" and together with some of his old soldiers created the partisan unit "Błyskawica" (Lightning bolt) to fight against the growing influence of the Soviet authorities.

== Back to the mountains ==
Between 11 April 1945 and 22 February 1947 "Ogień" fought a guerilla campaign against the communist authorities, the UB and the NKVD and those who supported the new political system of communist Poland. Most of the controversies surrounding Kuraś come from this period and many events have not been fully explained, since information at this time was tightly controlled by the ruling government. During this time Kuraś refused to come under the authority of any other major underground anti-communist political or military organization (such as Freedom and Independence) and operated completely on his own.

By 1946, units loyal to Kuraś were active in an area covering most of south central Poland, from the border with Slovakia to the region around Kraków, up to Miechów County.

He had a bunker below Turbacz mountain. He has been implicated in coordinating raids against Slovaks in the villages of Nedeca, Falštín, Frydman, Krempachy, Nová Belá, Čierna Hora, Repiská, Jurgov, Durštín, Tribš, Vyšné Lapše, Lapšanka, Nižné Lapše, Kacvín and villages in the Upper Orava region. He is suspected of giving judgments of death to the Slovak population, stealing cattle and demanding money from the villagers according to The Slovak Institute of National Remembrance, contrary to those of Poland's own equivalent body. Many Slovaks opted to move to other neighbouring towns in Slovakia as a result of these purported actions.

According to secret police sources who fought against him, "Ogień"'s unit (the Ogniowcy) numbered around 700 soldiers. Out of these, 320 "revealed" themselves as a result of the amnesty law of 22 February 1947 (passed on the day that Kuraś died); nevertheless a good many of them were later arrested, charged and sentenced anyway. In total, 184 members of his unit were captured, and of those 32 were sentenced to death and 21 were actually executed (the sentences of the rest were commuted). Some 88 members of the unit died during this period, and this number includes those who were executed on the orders of Kuraś himself for banditry and/or treason (UB informants were partly successful in infiltrating his unit). The fate of the rest of the partisans is unknown.

The UB documents state that "Ogień"'s partisans killed more than 60 functionaries of the secret police (UB), 40 members of the MO and 27 members of the NKWD. If the data from the largely discredited diary of "Ogień" (see below) is taken as true, he himself claimed that his unit killed 84 UB functionaries.

On 21 April 1946 Józef Kuraś was married for the second time, to Czesława Polaczyk.

== Death ==
In autumn 1946 the communist authorities began a major offensive against Kuraś' partisans. On 21 January 1947 "Ogień", while staying in a friendly village (Ostrowsko) with six of his fighters found himself surrounded by units of UB and MO (altogether numbering around 50 personnel) which had been tipped off as to his whereabouts by one their informants (a UB agent within Kuraś' unit ps. "Wanda"). During the ensuing gun fight two of the Ogniowcy were killed (including "Ogień"'s brother, Krzysztof Kuraś), two managed to escape, while Kuraś himself, along with Irena Olszewska, ps. "Hanka", hid in a nearby building. However, after setting fire to the original house in which Kuraś and his men defended themselves, the UB quickly realized what had happened. At that point, Kuraś gave "Hanka" an order to surrender herself and after she did so, shot himself in the head. He did not die immediately and as a result was taken, unconscious to the hospital in Nowy Targ where he died the following day.

He was buried in an unmarked grave whose location remains unknown to this day.

== Controversy and Kuraś' diary ==
There is a considerable amount of contradictory evidence presented by historians suggesting that Kuraś was personally guilty of a number of war crimes against Slovak refugees and advocated ethnic cleansing of Jews. Furthermore, the Slovak equivalent of the IPN disputes his portrayal as a hero. There is also evidence that he was complicit in the killings of Jewish refugees, including seven Jewish children.

Most of the controversy around Kuraś centers around material found in his supposed diaries, including the most publicized one which was released by the Communist authorities he was actively fighting against. To complicate matters there are actually three sets of documents that are sometimes referred to as "Kuraś' diary", none of which have been conclusively determined to be authentic.

According to Marcel Jesenský, "Kuraś personifies the famous dictum of the former US President Ronald Reagan: 'One man’s terrorist is another man’s freedom fighter.'"
