= Goralenvolk =

Geopolitical term invented by the German Nazis

- Part of the General Government zone of occupied Poland
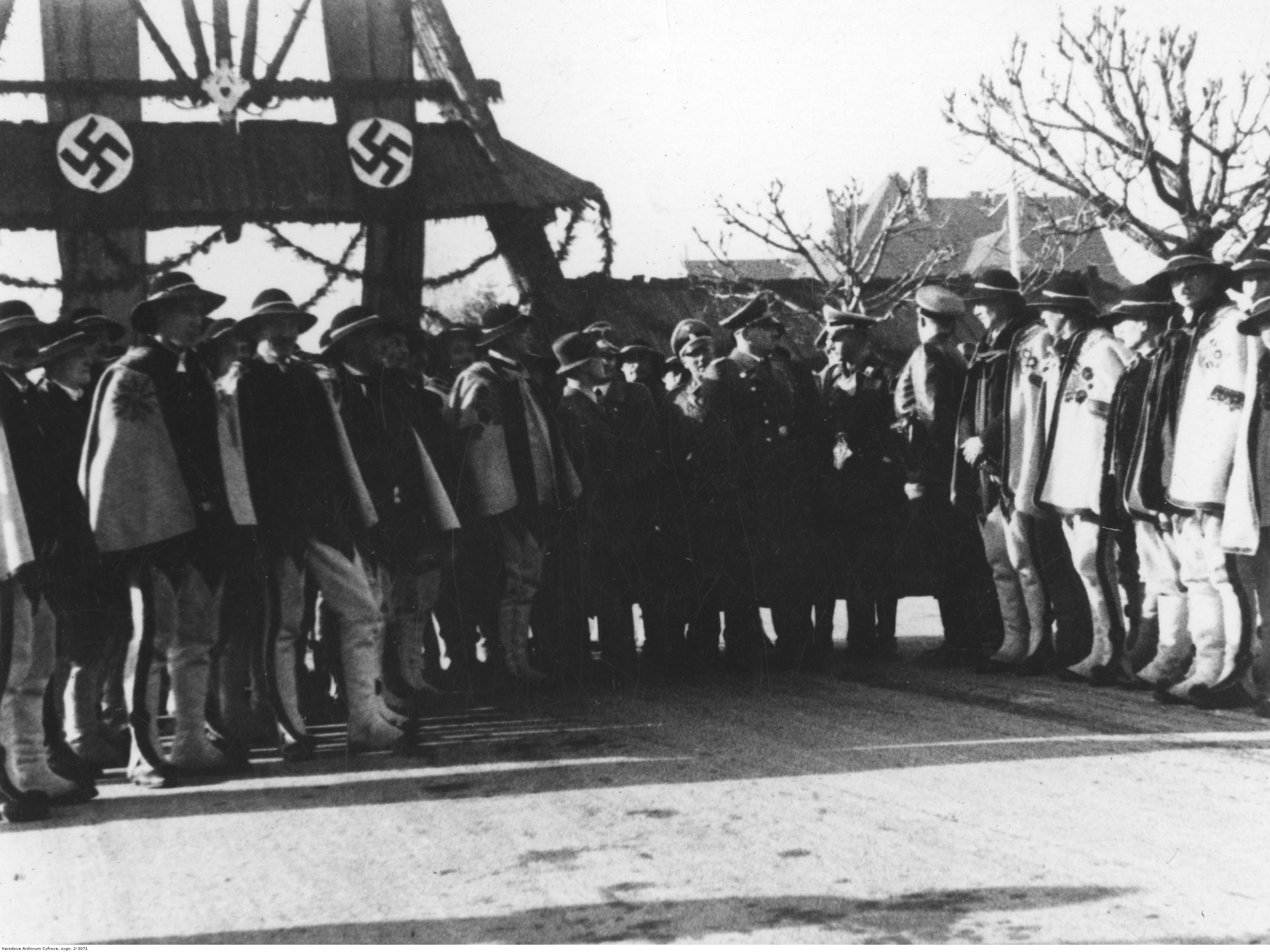
- Meeting of Governor Hans Frank in Zakopane with leaders of his Goralenvolk in November 1939
- Period: 1939–1943
- Membership: 200

Goralenvolk was a geopolitical term invented by the German Nazis in World War II in reference to the Goral highlander population of Podhale region in the south of Poland near the Slovak border. The Germans postulated a separate nationality for people of that region in an effort to extract them from the Polish citizenry during their occupation of Poland's highlands. The term Goralenvolk was a neologism derived from the Polish word Górale (the Highlanders) commonly referring to the ethnic group living in the Beskid and Tatra mountains. In an attempt to make the Gorals collaborate with the SS, the Nazis proclaimed that they were of Germanic descent, and were thus worthy of Germanisation and separate treatment from other Poles.

== Origin ==
Nazi ideology claimed that Gorals (Górale) were descended from ethnic Germans who allegedly settled in that region during medieval times in significant numbers. They were considered by the Nazi ideologues to be of Germanic origin. The concept of the Gorals being from German descent did not originate with the Nazis themselves. For example, the 1885 Meyers Konversationslexikon entry under Goralen stated, that Germans (also) lived in that area in the 11th century but were slavicized.

== German occupation ==
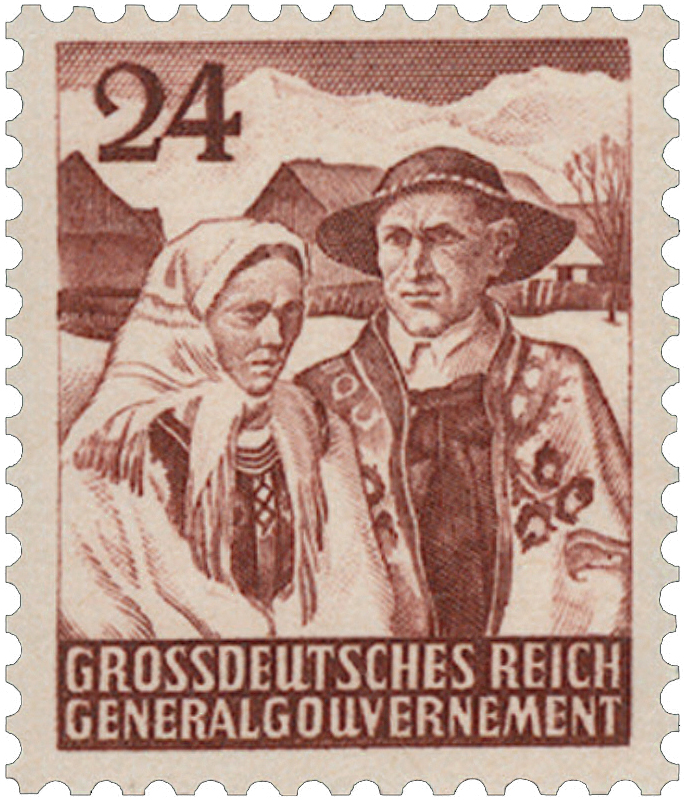
Peasant Goral couple depicted in a General Government stamp printed in 1944

The region inhabited by Górale (pre-war Polish Nowy Targ County in Podhale) was annexed by Germany immediately after the Invasion of Poland in 1939. Later, the German authorities attempted to assimilate the population into the body of Volksdeutsche, and to encourage their collaboration with the occupying forces. Soon, a small group of local collaborators gathered under the leadership of Reichsdeutscher Witalis Wieder, with Wacław Krzeptowski – a self-proclaimed Goralenführer – and his cousins Stefan and Andrzej Krzeptowski, as well as suspected German spy Henryk Szatkowski, and Józef Cukier from Zakopane. During a visit of Nazi Governor-General Hans Frank to Podhale on 7 November 1939 they proposed to establish a separate state for Goralenvolk. Most fled to Germany at the end of the war except for Krzeptowski himself, who decided to hide in the mountains (at na Stołach) in a secluded shack. He was apprehended by the Polish Armia Krajowa unit under Lieutenant Tadeusz Studziński, charged with high treason and hanged on 20 January 1945.

The implementation of the Goralenvolk action aimed at Germanization of the Polish highlanders was actively opposed by the underground Tatra Confederation, a Polish resistance organization founded in May 1941 in Nowy Targ (the historical capital of Podhale), by the poet and partisan, Augustyn Suski (nom-de-guerre Stefan Borusa) with Tadeusz Popek (Wacław Tatar) as his deputy and Jadwiga Apostoł (nom-de-guerre Barbara Spytkowska) as their administrative secretary. Suski was murdered at the Auschwitz concentration camp. Popek was tortured and executed in Zakopane. A German census conducted in 1940 showed that 72% of the local Goralenvolk population identified themselves as ethnically Polish rather than ethnically German. This result was a great disappointment for the Nazi administration.

=== Failed attempt at recruiting ===
In January 1943 the SS Germanische Leitstelle in occupied Zakopane in the heartland of the Tatra Mountains embarked on a recruitment drive, with the objective being to create a brand new Waffen-SS highlander division. Some 200 young Goralenvolk signed up after having been given unlimited supplies of alcoholic drinks. They boarded a train to Trawniki, but got off the train in nearby Maków Podhalański, when they had become sober. Only twelve men arrived at the SS training base in Trawniki next to Lublin. At the first opportunity they got into a major fistfight with the Ukrainians, causing havoc. They were arrested and sent away. The whole idea was abandoned as impossible by SS-Obergruppenführer Krüger in occupied Kraków by an official letter of 5 April 1943. The failure has inevitably contributed to his dismissal on 9 November 1943 by Governor General Hans Frank.

== See also ==
- Germanisation
- Walddeutsche
