= Jadwiga Apostoł =

Polish WWII underground activist (1913–1990)

Jadwiga Apostoł-Staniszewska
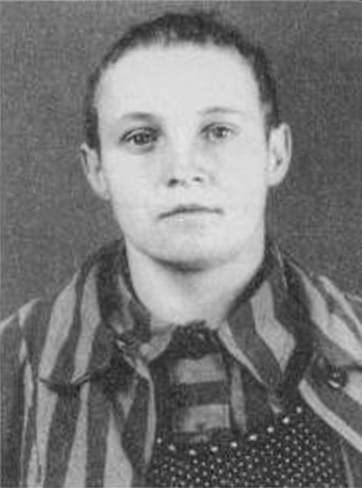
- Jadwiga Apostoł at Auschwitz, 1942
- Born: 22 December 1913; Nowy Targ, Austria-Hungary
- Died: 2 February 1990 (aged 76); Nowy Targ, Poland
- Other name: Barbara Spytkowska
- Known for: Underground Tatra Confederation

Jadwiga Apostoł-Staniszewska (22 December 1913 – 2 February 1990) was a Polish teacher in the interwar period, an underground activist during World War II, and a writer in postwar Poland.

Under the German occupation of Podhale, Apostoł (nom-de-guerre Barbara Spytkowska) became the co-founder of the Polish resistance group called the Tatra Confederation (Polish: Konfederacja Tatrzańska), a.k.a. Confederation of the Tatra Mountains, actively opposing the germanization of the Polish highlanders.

Apostoł survived Auschwitz and Malchow Nazi concentration camps, as well as Leipzig Arbeitslager before returning to Poland. After the Soviet conquest – as the only executive-member of the Tatra Confederation who was still alive – she was persecuted by the Ministry of Public Security and sentenced to five years in prison on trumped-up charges.

Released the same year thanks to an amnesty, she was permanently barred from her occupation as a teacher. Jadwiga Apostoł spent the rest of her life in Szczecin. She returned to Podhale shortly before her death and was buried in Nowy Targ.

== Biography ==
Jadwiga Apostoł was born in Nowy Targ, the oldest of three children of Wincenty Apostoł, organist and choir master, and Magdalena (née Czubernat), a dressmaker. In 1932, she graduated from the Teachers' College and got a job at an elementary school in Nowogródek – far away from home. She came back from Kresy to Nowy Targ in 1939, only to witness the invasion of Poland. Immediately afterwards, her family began to smuggle Polish officers (who were escaping arrest) across the border to Slovakia and Hungary on their way to Polish military formations abroad.

In May 1941, Apostoł joined the Tatra Confederation (KT), a resistance group formed in Nowy Targ by Augustyn Suski and Tadeusz Popek to oppose the Nazi Goralenvolk action aimed at the germanization of the Polish highlanders. She became the KT executive secretary in charge of organizational and administrative duties, writing announcements for clandestine newsletters and typing all the group's printed material. While her parents kept watch on the road, she operated a duplicating machine installed in the attic of their remote home.

== Capture and persecution ==
The Tatra Confederation rose in popularity, having dozens of cells around Limanowa, Wadowice and Myślenice towns, and almost 500 members by the end of 1941. However, in January 1942 it was infiltrated by the Gestapo and broken up.

Apostoł escaped arrest by chance, and went into hiding. She moved between Skomielna, Jordanów, and Bogdanówka near Myślenice, where she was finally turned in by an informant and arrested along with her co-conspirator Tadeusz Popek on 22 August 1942.

She was brought to the Palace Hotel – the Gestapo headquarters in Zakopane – and interrogated for three months. From there, she was transferred to prison in Kraków and a month later deported to Auschwitz, where she worked for the Gardening Commando (prisoner # 26,273). On January 18, 1945, she was part of the forced evacuation of the camp, the Death March, from Auschwitz to Wodzisław Śląski, from which she was transported to Ravensbrück, along with the rest of the female prisoners and taken to its Malchow sub-camp. She escaped near Leipzig from one of the subsequent transports and survived the war.

== Post-war ==
Following the war, Apostoł held jobs in Nowy Targ and Szaflary. In 1949 she was arrested by the Ministry of Public Security, along with several others, and was accused of plotting against the People's Republic of Poland. She was sentenced to five years in prison, but released soon later due to a general pardon.

Ostracized by the local authorities and unable to find work, she moved away from Podhale to Szczecin. However, the persecution did not stop there; she was forced to work as a construction laborer for the next decade. In 1964 she married Ludwik Staniszewski, an office clerk. She lived and wrote her memoirs in Szczecin until her retirement.

After her husband's death in 1985, Apostoł-Staniszewska moved back to Nowy Targ, where she died on 2 February 1990, aged 76.

== Works ==
- Jadwiga Apostoł-Staniszewska, Echa okupacyjnych lat (Echoes of Years of Occupation), Ludowa Spółdzielnia Wydawnicza, Warsaw, 1970 reprinted in 1973, 322 pages, OCLC 3785812; memoir of the Tatra Confederation (in Polish)
- Jadwiga Apostoł-Staniszewska, Nim zbudził się dzień (Before the Day's Outbreak), Ludowa Spółdzielnia Wydawnicza, Warsaw, 1979, ISBN 83-205-3159-4 (in Polish); translated into German as Erinnerungen aus d. dt. Konzentrationslagern Auschwitz, Ravensbrück u. Majdanek; a memoir of her imprisonment in German camps (in German)
- Jadwiga Apostoł, Ucałujcie polska ziemię (To Kiss the Polish Soil), relation of escape from the German transport. Unpublished
- Jadwiga Apostoł, Spotkania z przeszłością (Meetings with the Past), memoir of Stalinist persecution, 1945–1953. Unpublished (in Polish)
