= Henryk Szatkowski =

Polish politician (born 1900)

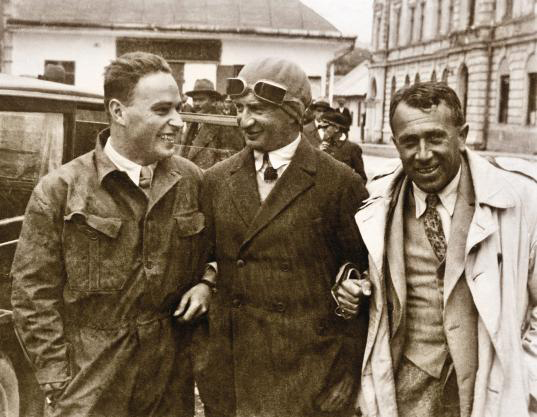
- Szatkowski (left) from Nazi German Goralenvolk action, in Zakopane, late 1930s

Personal details
- Born: November 27, 1900 Kraków, Poland
- Spouse: Maria
- Children: yes
- Occupation: Politician, sports and tourism activist
- Known for: Leader of Goralenvolk action in Podhale during World War II

Henryk Szatkowski (born 27 November 1900) was one of the leaders of the Nazi German Goralenvolk action in the Podhale region of occupied Poland during World War II. A self-proclaimed Volksdeutscher ("ethnic German"), he was a sports and tourism activist in Zakopane from before the invasion. Szatkowski collaborated with the Nazis, worked as an informer, and promoted the failed Goralische Freiwilligen SS Legion. According to at least one modern day account he was blackmailed. However, Polish historian Jan Berghauzen suspects him of being a well established spy in Zakopane working for German intelligence service.

Szatkowski was born in Kraków on 27 November 1900.

Szatkowski fled from Podhale with the retreating Nazis at the end of World War II, never to be heard from again. He left behind wife Maria and children.
