= Augustyn Suski =

Polish Goral poet and pedagogue

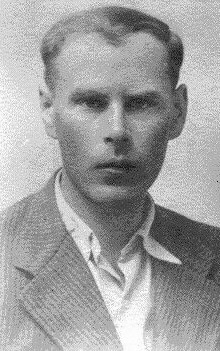
- Suski in the 1930s
- Born: 8 November 1907; Szaflary, Kingdom of Galicia and Lodomeria, Austria-Hungary
- Died: 26 May 1942 (aged 34); Auschwitz-Birkenau, German-occupied Poland
- Writing career
- Notable work: Poezja Młodego Podhala (1937)

Augustyn Suski (8 November 1907 – 26 May 1942) was a Polish Goral poet, pedagogue in the interwar period, and underground activist during World War II. Under the German occupation, Suski (nom-de-guerre Stefan Borusa) became a founder of the Polish resistance organization called Tatra Confederation (Polish: Konfederacja Tatrzańska), a.k.a. Confederation of the Tatra Mountains, operating in the Nowy Targ area of Podhale. He was murdered at the Auschwitz concentration camp.

== Biography ==
Augustyn Suski was born in Szaflary near Nowy Targ, one of six children of bakery owner Ludwik Suski and Marianna née Haschir of Hungarian background. He finished high school in Nowy Targ, and enrolled at the Philosophy Department of the Jagiellonian University in Kraków. Suski interrupted his studies with the military training between 1929 and 1930, and continued university courses till June 1935. However, he did not receive master's due to financial difficulties. Suski worked as a tutor, joined the board of Student Folk Society (Akademicka Młodzież Ludowa), performed at readings and published his poetry at the Gazeta Podhalańska and the Marchołt quarterly. In spite of having mastered the rules of Polish grammar, he wrote in heavy regional dialect in order to capture the essence of his Goral characters. His use of local speech was influenced by the Suski's lifelong devotion to Podhale and its people, best exemplified in his poem "Do gwary mojej" (To my speech).

Augustyn Suski found a teaching position in Volhynia, away from home – at the folk universities in Michałówa near Dubno and in Różyn near Kowel. He taught history of the peasant movements, language skills, as well as Polish and Ukrainian history. In Różyn, he held the principal position from 1938 till the invasion of Poland by Nazi Germany and the Soviet Union. Suski attempted to escape back to General Government from the Soviet zone of occupation, but was caught by the Germans and sent to prison in Cieszyn. He was released on 15 May 1941, helped by his family.

== Work in the resistance ==
Suski returned to Podhale and soon joined the resistance. He wrote and published underground literature against the Goralenvolk action directed at the assimilation of Polish highlanders into the body of Volksdeutsche. While in Nowy Targ, Suski founded the clandestine Tatra Confederation (Konfederacja Tatrzańska) with Tadeusz Popek and Jadwiga Apostoł and wrote its statute. It was a gathering of likeminded people willing to stand up to the germanization of Podhale. The Confederation quickly rose in popularity with dozens of branches around Limanowa, Wadowice and Myślenice towns, and almost 500 members by the end of 1941. Among its publications was the subversive newsletter Der Freie Deutsche distributed as far as Kraków.

In January 1942 the Tatra Confederation was infiltrated by its own founders' former acquaintance and the Gestapo agent SS-Oberscharführer Heinz Wegner (a.k.a. Stanisław Wegner-Romanowski). Suski refused to agree to his assassination for the lack of material evidence. He was soon arrested, interrogated and tortured at the infamous Palace Hotel in Zakopane. Suski was sent to prison in Tarnów and from there, to Auschwitz concentration camp (prisoner # 27399). He died at KL Auschwitz of prior injuries and general exhaustion on 26 May 1942. On the 60th anniversary of his birthday, his hometown of Szaflary unveiled a monument in memory of Augustyn Suski, followed by the 2007 conference organized by the Polish Historical Society on the centennial of his birth.

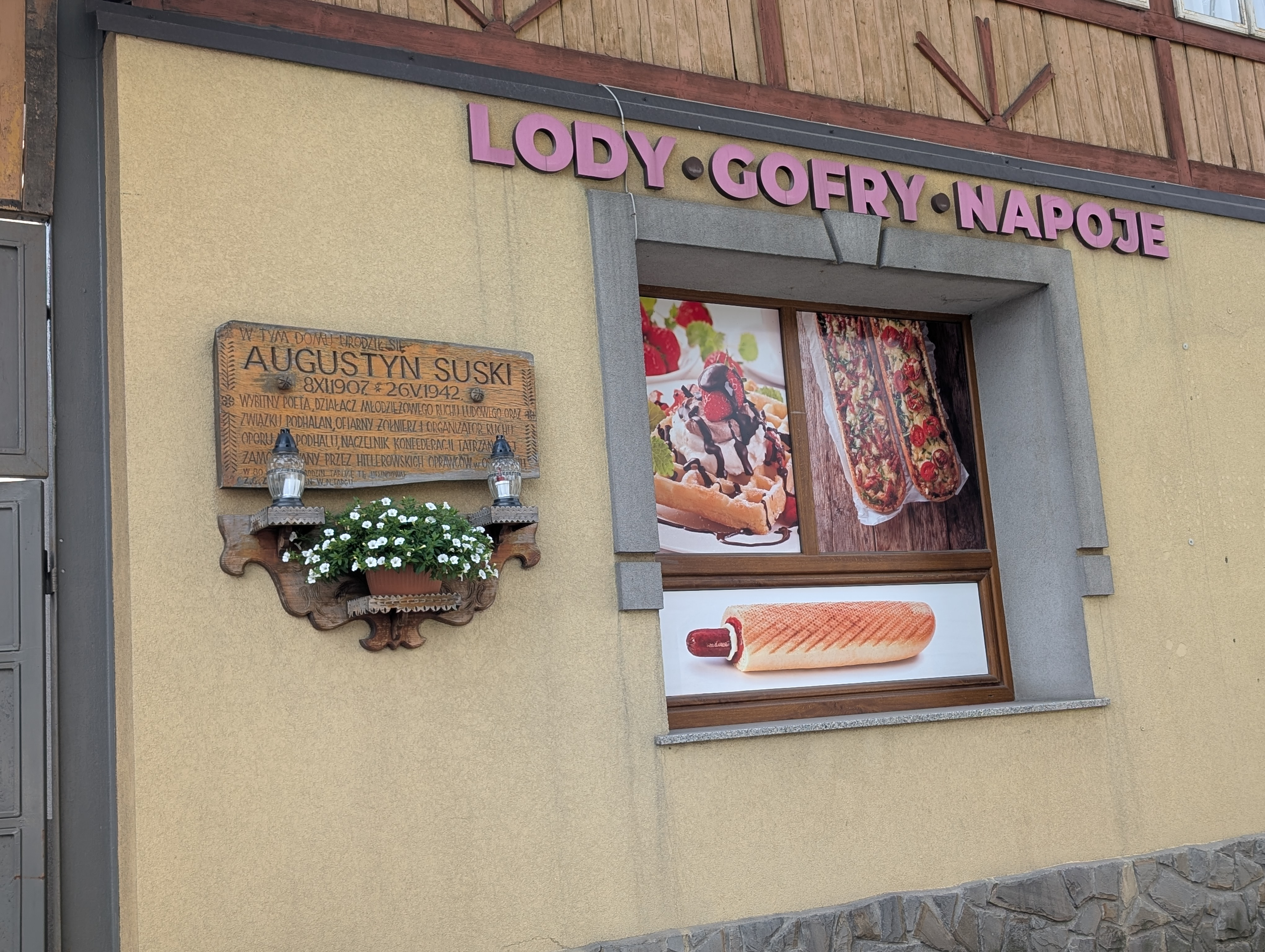
Memorial plaque to Augustyn Suski in Szaflary

== Publications ==
- Augustyn Suski, Listy ze wsi, "Marchołt" Quarterly, 1935
- Poezja Młodego Podhala, anthology, Kraków, 1937
- Augustyn Suski, Utwory zebrane (Collected Works), Ludowa Spółdzielnia Wydawnicza, Warsaw, 1966
