= Waksmund =

- Village
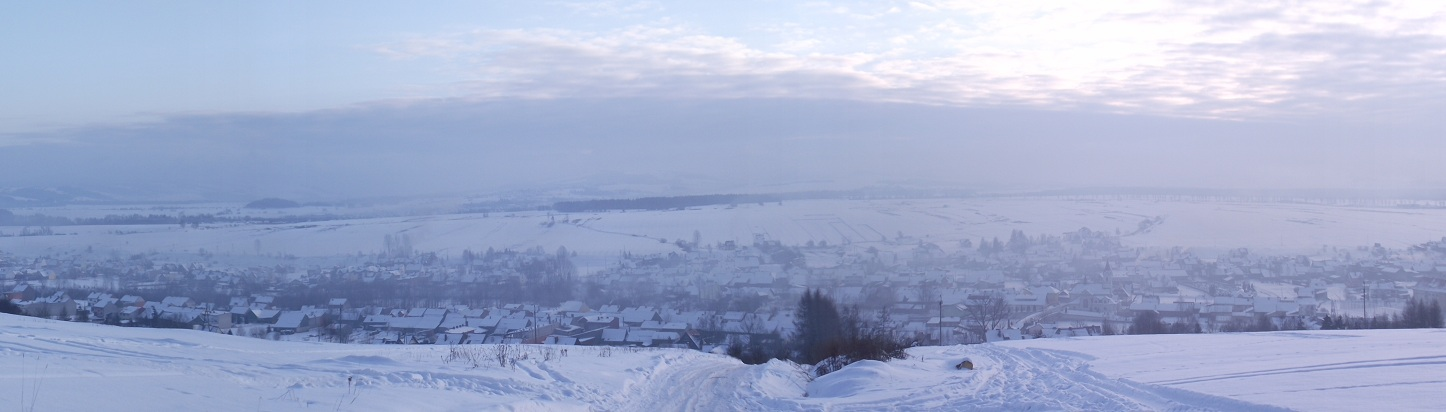
- Waksmund from Gorce

- Location within Poland
- Coordinates: 49°29′N 20°5′E
- Country: Poland
- Voivodeship: Lesser Poland
- County: Nowy Targ
- Gmina: Nowy Targ
- Highest elevation: 670 m (2,200 ft)
- Lowest elevation: 545 m (1,788 ft)
- Population: 2,439

Waksmund [ˈvaksmunt] is a village in the administrative district of Gmina Nowy Targ, within Nowy Targ County, Lesser Poland Voivodeship, in southern Poland.

== History ==
The current village was settled by German immigrants under Magdeburg Law in the years 1334–1338. Previously, a village under the name Wilcze Pole or Wolf's Field existed. During the Battle of Grunwald in 1410 the village became famous for sending five armed men to fight on the side of King Władysław II Jagiełło for which the village received land in the nearby Tatra Mountains - Hala Waksmundzka (Meadow of Waksmund) and Dolina Waksmundzka (Valley of Waksmund) near Morskie Oko.

During the Second World War, on June 29, 1943, the village was the site of one of the worst massacres carried out by the Nazi occupiers in the Podhale region, after the break-up of the Tatra Confederation revealed that many members of the resistance organization were from this village.

== Geography ==
Waksmund lies at an elevation of 565 metres primarily on the south bank of the river Dunajec in a hollow between two fossil sandar from the ice age. On the north bank of the Dunajec the land rises abruptly into the Gorce Mountains, on the south bank it slopes much gentler further south until it reaches the foothills of the Tatra Mountains some 6 to 8 kilometres further to the south near Białka Tatrzańska. The westernmost outlier of the Pieniny range, Gisowa Skała, lies a few kilometres to the southeast of the village near to Gronków. Within twenty kilometres of Waksmund, three national parks can be found: Gorczański, Tatrzański and Pieniński National Park.

=== Climate ===
On average, Waksmund has a fairly similar climate to other places in lower Podhale, although slightly colder - average annual temperature is around 5.6 °C, with the warmest month, July, averaging 16.5 °C, and the coldest month, January, averaging -6.2 °C, placing it firmly within the Dfb climate zone.

Annual precipitation is around 850 millimetres, annual sunshine hours around 1500. Snow remains on the ground on average 111 days per year, and the average length of the growing season is 189 days.

Spring sees large diurnal ranges; it can be up to 20 °C during mid day, while at night it can cool down to -10 °C.

Winter temperatures however, are among the coldest in Poland due to the unique geography which causes the area to function quite like a cold sink; -35 °C is not unheard of on calm and clear nights above a fresh snow cover during a cold spell, and an unofficial all-time record low of -49 °C was reported in the winter of 1929. Whether this is valid or due to faulty equipment is unknown. Waksmund on such nights can be 5 to 7 °C colder than nearby Nowy Targ or Białka Tatrzańska. (A similar effect, although far more pronounced, happens at Funtensee in Germany.) The opposite has also been known to happen. The area is susceptible to foehn winds, known locally as halny which can come from both the south as well as the north, and rising air temperatures with as much as 15 °C in a matter of an hour, accompanied by low humidity and strong winds.

Summers are mild, with average highs around 20 to 25 °C and nighttime lows around 10 °C.

== Notable residents ==
- Józef Kuraś, resistance fighter
- Andrzej Waksmundzki, chemist
