= Euryale lissa =

Euryale lissa Temporal range: Pliocene

Scientific classification
- Kingdom: Plantae
- Clade: Tracheophytes
- Clade: Angiosperms
- Order: Nymphaeales
- Family: Nymphaeaceae
- Genus: Euryale
- Species: †E. lissa

Binomial name
- †Euryale lissa C. Reid & E. Reid

Extinct species of flowering plant

Euryale lissa is a fossil species of Euryale from the Pliocene of Brunssum, Limburg Province, Netherlands and from Höchst, Germany.

== Description ==
The obovate, smooth, 7 mm long, and 6 mm wide seeds have a prominent raphe. The surface of the seed is smooth or has a finely granulate texture.

== Taxonomy ==
It was first published as Euryale lissa C. Reid, E. Reid by Clement Reid and Eleanor Mary Reid in 1915. It has been proposed to place it in a separate genus Pseudoeuryale P.I. Dorof. as Pseudoeuryale lissa (C. Reid, E. Reid) Doweld published by Alexander Borisovitch Doweld in 2022. In one study it is suggested that Euryale lissa may represent immature seeds of Euryale limburgensis.

== Distribution ==
It is known from the type locality Brunssum, Limburg Province, Netherlands, and from Höchst, Germany.
