= Euryale nodulosa =

Euryale nodulosa Temporal range: Pliocene

Scientific classification
- Kingdom: Plantae
- Clade: Tracheophytes
- Clade: Angiosperms
- Order: Nymphaeales
- Family: Nymphaeaceae
- Genus: Euryale
- Species: †E. nodulosa

Binomial name
- †Euryale nodulosa C. Reid & E. Reid

Extinct species of flowering plant

Euryale nodulosa is a fossil species of Euryale from the Pliocene of Reuver, Limburg Province, Netherlands and Italy.

== Description ==
It is an aquatic herb with globose, 8mm long, and 8 mm wide seeds. The testa has nodules.

== Taxonomy ==
It was first published as Euryale nodulosa C. Reid, E. Reid by Clement Reid and Eleanor Mary Reid in 1915. It has been proposed to place it in a separate genus Pseudoeuryale P.I. Dorof. as Pseudoeuryale nodulosa (C. Reid, E. Reid) A.G. Negru published by Andrei Grigorievich Negru in 1979. It has also been viewed as a synonym of Euryale europaea by Kirchheimer, which was rejected by Martinetto.

== Distribution ==
It occurred in the Netherlands, and in Italy.
