= Euryale europaea =

Euryale europaea Temporal range: Pleistocene

Scientific classification
- Kingdom: Plantae
- Clade: Tracheophytes
- Clade: Angiosperms
- Order: Nymphaeales
- Family: Nymphaeaceae
- Genus: Euryale
- Species: †E. europaea

Binomial name
- †Euryale europaea C.A. Weber

Fossil species of flowering plant

Euryale europaea is a fossil species of Euryale from the Pleistocene of Chekalin, Kaluga region, Russia, Belgium, and Bulgaria.

== Description ==
The dark brown, ovoid, 5.6 mm long, and 5.65 mm wide, operculate seeds have a prominent raphe. The 0.27–0.32 mm thick testa is smooth. The elliptic operculum is 2.14 mm long, and 1.25 mm wide.

== Taxonomy ==
It was published by Carl Albert Weber in April 1907. In three separate instances it has been suggested to treat it as a member of a separate genus Pseudoeuryale P.I. Dorof.: First Pseudoeuryale europaea (C.A. Weber) P.I. Dorof. was published by Pavel Ivanovich Dorofeev in October 1972, followed by Pseudoeuryale europaea (C.A. Weber) P.I. Dorof. ex Mai. published by Dieter Hans Mai based on previous work by Pavel Ivanovich Dorofeev in September 1973, and lastly Pseudoeuryale europaea (C.A. Weber) P.I. Dorof. published by Pavel Ivanovich Dorofeev in March 1975. The same species name was used by Clement Reid and Eleanor Mary Reid for Euryale europaea C. Reid & E. Reid published in September 1907 and as the name was already taken, this is a nomen illegitimum. Its correct name is Euryale limburgensis C. Reid & E. Reid.

The neotype was designated by Alexander Borissovitch Doweld in 2022 and it is held in the collection of the Komarov Botanical Institute, Russian Academy of Sciences, St. Petersburg, Russia.

== Etymology ==
The specific epithet europaea means European.

== Distribution ==
It occurred in Russia, Belgium, and Bulgaria.
