= Euryale limburgensis =

Euryale limburgensis Temporal range: Pliocene–Pleistocene

Scientific classification
- Kingdom: Plantae
- Clade: Tracheophytes
- Clade: Angiosperms
- Order: Nymphaeales
- Family: Nymphaeaceae
- Genus: Euryale
- Species: †E. limburgensis

Binomial name
- †Euryale limburgensis C. Reid & E. Reid

Extinct species of flowering plant

Euryale limburgensis is a fossil species of Euryale from the Pliocene of Tegelen, Limburg Province, Netherlands, from the lower Pleistocene of Greece, from the Pliocene and Pleistocene of Italy, and from the Pliocene of France.

== Description ==
The seeds are 9 mm long, and 7 mm wide. The testa is granulate.

== Taxonomy ==
It was first published as Euryale europaea C. Reid, E. Reid. by Clement Reid and Eleanor Mary Reid in September 1907. It was published later than Euryale europaea C. A. Weber published by Carl Albert Weber in April 1907. Therefore, it was changed to Euryale limburgensis C. Reid, E. Reid published by Clement Reid and Eleanor Mary Reid in July 1910. The type locality is Tegelen, Limburg Province, the Netherlands. It has been proposed to move it to a separate genus Pseudoeuryale P.I. Dorof. as Pseudoeuryale limburgensis (C. Reid, E. Reid) P.I. Dorof. published by Pavel Ivanovich Dorofeev in October 1972 .

== Distribution ==
It occurred in the Netherlands, Greece, Italy, and France.
