= Kąty, Nowy Targ County =

Kąty
- Coordinates: 49°27′0″N 20°23′47″E
- Country: Poland
- Voivodeship: Lesser Poland
- County: Nowy Targ
- Gmina: Krościenko nad Dunajcem

Kąty [ˈkɔntɨ] is a part of village Krościenko nad Dunajcem in the administrative district of Gmina Krościenko nad Dunajcem, within Nowy Targ County, Lesser Poland Voivodeship, in southern Poland, close to the border with Slovakia.
