= Bílý Potok =

Bílý Potok may refer to places in the Czech Republic:

- Bílý Potok (Liberec District), a municipality and village in the Liberec Region
- Bílý Potok (Javorník), a village and part of Javorník in the Olomouc Region
- Bílý Potok, a village and part of Vrbno pod Pradědem in the Moravian-Silesian Region

== See also ==
- Bili Potok, Bosnia and Herzegovina
- Biały Potok, Poland
