= Euryale carpatica =

Euryale carpatica Temporal range: Pliocene

Scientific classification
- Kingdom: Plantae
- Clade: Tracheophytes
- Clade: Angiosperms
- Order: Nymphaeales
- Family: Nymphaeaceae
- Genus: Euryale
- Species: †E. carpatica

Binomial name
- †Euryale carpatica Szafer

Extinct species of flowering plant

Euryale carpatica is a fossil species of Euryale from the Pliocene of Krościenko nad Dunajcem, Poland.

== Description ==
The 5.8 mm long, and 5.3 mm wide seed has a smooth, 0.6–0.7 mm thick testa.

== Taxonomy ==
It was first published as Euryale carpatica Szafer by Władysław Szafer in 1947. It has been proposed to move it to a separate genus Pseudoeuryale P.I. Dorof. as Pseudoeuryale carpatica (Szafer) Doweld published by Alexander Borisovitch Doweld in 2022. The type specimen was found in Krościenko nad Dunajcem, Poland.

== Etymology ==
The specific epithet carpatica references the Carpathian Mountains.

== Distribution ==
It occurred in Poland.
