= Marjorie Elizabeth Jane Chandler =

English palaeobotanist

- Born: 18 May 1897; Royal Leamington Spa, England
- Died: 1 October 1983 (aged 86); Swindon, England
- Education: Cambridge University
- Awards: Lyell Medal
- Scientific career
- Fields: Palaeobotany

Marjorie Chandler (1897–1983) was a British paleobotanist who published pioneering research in long time-partnership with her assistant Eleanor Mary Reid.

== Life ==
Marjorie Elizabeth Jane Chandler was born in Leamington Spa, Warwickshire, to Frederick Augustus, a jeweller, and Alice Sarah (born Roberts) Chandler. She was the oldest of six children. Chandler obtained a scholarship to Newnham College, Cambridge in 1915 after attending Leamington High School. At Cambridge University she obtained a first-class degree in the natural sciences in 1919. Chandler received her M.A. in 1948 from Cambridge. In 1920 she went to work as the research assistant of Eleanor Mary Reid who was one of four women who became fellows of the Geological Society that year. Reid's base was in Milford on Sea, Hampshire, from where she worked and where they established a lifelong scientific partnership. Chandler eventually became Reid's nurse until she died in 1953 in Milford. Chandler herself retired and died in Swindon, Wiltshire, in 1983. In her retirement she was a keen gardener and involved with church-related activities while still keeping in contact with the scientific world through other paleobotanists.

== Career ==
Chandler and Reid researched prehistoric plants using the collections of the British Museum. After six years they published Bembridge Flora which was an extensive description of Cenozoic plants and particularly those found on the Isle of Wight. The second volume was published by Chandler and Reid in 1933 and this looked at the fossilised plants of the London clay. Reid's attic was their laboratory and Chandler endured its freezing cold winters and hot summers. Reid described the changing climatic conditions in the Tertiary period using the remains of the flora seen in different aged rocks. This gave new evidence of the evolutionary changes that took place within plants. Reid and Chandler's studies showed that the land now known as London had at one time been part of a tropical forest. Reid was recognised for this work when she was awarded the Lyell Medal in 1936 by the Geological Society.

Chandler's impact on the study of Geology is seen through her research concerning the London Clay flora. Her research examined the "angiosperm fruits and seeds of the Palaeocene floras ... and those of the London Clay not previously described."

From 1933 Chandler took the lead focusing on Tertiary floras. Reid continued to support Chandler and to write the occasional short paper. Chandler's finances were dependent on a small grant from the British Museum that was awarded annually. Chandler was recognised internationally as she extended the work she and Reid had done as partners to other aspects of the Eocene and Oligocene periods. Chandler's own research described the historic plants of Dorset and Bournemouth and she created a supplement to the London Flora which ran to hundreds of pages. A noted publication of hers was The Lower Tertiary Floras of Southern England which she published in 1961.

The standard author abbreviation M.Chandler is used to indicate this person as the author when citing a botanical name.

== Publications ==
The Lower Tertiary Floras of Southern England

The Lower Tertiary Floras of Southern England was published in five volumes from January 1961 cataloguing and describing fossilised vegetation from different stratigraphic groups located in southern England. Many of the seeds described in the text have been found in the Thanet Formation located in Herne Bay, Kent. Other floras depicted in the publication are from other locations, but prominent areas include Sussex, Middlesex, Surrey, and Warden Point on the Isle of Sheppey as well as other areas of Kent. The atlas contains illustrations of many fossilised plant remains, mostly seeds. Less commonly, preserved fruits are also pictured. Each specimen is shown from many different angles, showing varying degrees of imperfections and decay.

Volume I: Palaeocene Floras: London Clay Flora.

Volume II: Flora of the Pipe-Clay Series of Dorset (Lower Bagshot)

Volume III: Flora of the Bournemouth Beds; The Boscombe, and the Highcliff Sands

Volume IV: A Summary and Survey of Findings in the Light of Recent Botanical Observations

Volume V: Supplement to the Lower Tertiary Floras of Southern England

The London Clay Flora By Eleanor Mary Reid & Marjorie Elizabeth Jane Chandler

One of the key publications regarding the London Clay Flora which are located at the shores at Sheppey. This publication functions as the second part of the Catalogue of Cenozoic Plants in the Department of Geology at the British Museum of Natural History. Before the publication of this work the London Clay Flora had not been the subject of a published work since Bowerbank's work a century earlier. Compared to Bowerbank's book, Reid and Chandler's publication focuses less on the general description of the fossil fruits and seeds at the shores and more on the conditions that allowed the fossils to occur. Although there is a descriptive section in the publication where Reid and Chandler engage in systematic descriptions of thallophyta, charophyta, cymnospermae, monocotyledones, and dicotyledones, the main importance of this publication lies in the conclusion the authors present regarding flora, the climate of the London Clay flora, and relations between fossils and floras.

The Bembridge Beds

The beds which yielded the rich flora to be described occur on the north-west coast of the Isle of Wight, in Gurnard Bay and Thorness Bay, about two miles to the south-west of Cowes. With few exceptions, all the plants were obtained from these localities. The exposure shows a variable series of clays and marls rich in selenite. These can be seen in the cliff when the section is not obscured by vegetation and landslides, and on the foreshore when the tide is low. At full tide, most of the exposure is inaccessible, not be examined in the cliff-face after a spell of wet weather. The clays and marls, by oxidation and weathering, give rise to red clay-ironstone nodules; and various stages in the consolidation of these may be observed.

LXIV. Note on some abnormally large spores formerly attributed to Isoetes

At several Tertiary/Quaternary several large spores began to appear. The origin of these spores was unknown as they were a lot larger than any know Isoetes. Studies done by R. Potonie suggested these spores have derived from older deposits. These spores were compared with various Carboniferous types. Evidence also suggests they belong to the floras with which they are associated with. Due to corrosion some of the features of the spores may not remain the same.

Arctic Flora of the Cam Valley

Chandler took over the research that was looking at the occurrence of peat - seams yielding definite plant- remains which Reid, who unfortunately could not continue his research due to his death in 1916. The research was taking place at the Barnwell pit in Barnwell, Cambridgeshire, where Reid intended to make a full examination of the beds but death prevented him from achieving this examination. Chandler had the opportunity to examine the beds, which at this time had fresh material which revealed a larger fossil flora than Reid had suspected.

Chandler used the recent collection of seeds made by Reid, also known as the Reid collection, as her standard for all of her systematic work in examining the fossils to determine the age of the Arctic floras in the Cam Valley. The main focus of this publication was to prove that the plant deposits were formed prior to the end of the Upper Palaeolithic times. This publication also showed that plant life had increased and decreased due to stress of climate and that certain species of Flora almost became nearly extinct in certain parts of Britain as the climate got warmer.

Chandler had an opportunity to investigate the Barnwell Pit, in which she would examine material that revealed the existence of larger fossil flora than first believed. This discovery allowed her to write an article named “The Arctic Flora of the Cam Valley at Barnwell, Cambridge” in which she could record the results from that investigation at Barnwell Pit.There had been few records of these Arctic Flora growing at latitudes this low, many of these plants were not recognized in the fossil state at the time of this discovery. These discoveries were considered important, allowing the full study results to be put on record, so that other workers in this field would be able to access these results.

The Fossil Flora of Clacton on Sea

Eleanor Mary Reid, the wife of Clement Reid, and Chandler were able to reexamine and start their own investigations of the Clacton materials. Samuel Hazzledine Warren made the initial discovery of these results in 1916, at which point Clement Reid started looking into them more thoroughly. Reid and Chandler thought their own investigation had unearthed numerous unidentified species that Reid had not initially detected, proving Reid's observations to be false. There were 135 species at this time.

The plants were broken down into five categories in the report: the Arctic-Alpine group, the Group of Plants of Wider Distribution, the Southern Element, the Calcareous-Soil Group, and the Estuarine Group. The Arctic-Alpine Group contained the most plant species in the region, accounting for 42% of all plant species.
