= Dziadowe Kąty =

- Coordinates: 49°26′50″N 20°23′12″E
- Country: Poland
- Voivodeship: Lesser Poland
- County: Nowy Targ
- Gmina: Krościenko nad Dunajcem

Dziadowe Kąty [d͡ʑaˈdɔvɛ ˈkɔntɨ] is a part of village Grywałd in the administrative district of Gmina Krościenko nad Dunajcem, within Nowy Targ County, Lesser Poland Voivodeship, in southern Poland, close to the border with Slovakia.
