= Euryale spinosa =

Euryale spinosa Temporal range: Miocene

Scientific classification
- Kingdom: Plantae
- Clade: Tracheophytes
- Clade: Angiosperms
- Order: Nymphaeales
- Family: Nymphaeaceae
- Genus: Euryale
- Species: †E. spinosa

Binomial name
- †Euryale spinosa J.B. Simpson

Fossil species of flowering plant

Euryale spinosa is a fossil species of Euryale from the Miocene of Ardnamurchan, Scotland, United Kingdom.

== Description ==
The circular to elliptical pollen grains with a spiny exine are 30 μm wide. It bears a 3 μm wide furrow. The sharp, stout spines are 2 μm long.

== Taxonomy ==
It was published by John Baird Simpson in 1961 based on fossil pollen grains.

== Etymology ==
The specific epithet spinosa means spiny.

== Distribution ==
It occurred in Scotland, United Kingdom.
