= Euryale sukaczevii =

Euryale sukaczevii Temporal range: Miocene

Scientific classification
- Kingdom: Plantae
- Clade: Tracheophytes
- Clade: Angiosperms
- Order: Nymphaeales
- Family: Nymphaeaceae
- Genus: Euryale
- Species: †E. sukaczevii

Binomial name
- †Euryale sukaczevii P.I. Dorof.

Fossil species of flowering plant

Euryale sukaczevii is a fossil species of Euryale from the Miocene of Omsk, Russia, and possibly Germany.

== Description ==
The ovoid, 6.9–11.8 mm long, and 6.5–9.1 mm wide seeds have a thick, crumpled testa.

== Taxonomy ==
It was first published as Euryale sukaczevii P.I. Dorof. by Pavel Ivanovich Dorofeev in 1959. It has been proposed to move it to a separate genus Palaeoeuryale P.I. Dorof., of which it is the type species, as Palaeoeuryale sukaczevii (P.I. Dorof.) P.I. Dorof published by Pavel Ivanovich Dorofeev in 1972. Later it was proposed to move it to the genus Pseudoeuryale P.I. Dorof. as Pseudoeuryale sukaczevii (P.I. Dorof.) Doweld published by Alexander Borisovitch Doweld in 2022.

== Distribution ==
It occurred in Russia, and possibly in Germany.
