= Krościenko =

Krościenko can refer to three villages in Poland:

- Krościenko nad Dunajcem, Lesser Poland Voivodeship
- Krościenko Wyżne, Subcarpathian Voivodeship
- Krościenko, Bieszczady County in Subcarpathian Voivodeship (south-east Poland)
