= Euryale ucrainica =

Euryale ucrainica Temporal range: Miocene

Scientific classification
- Kingdom: Plantae
- Clade: Tracheophytes
- Clade: Angiosperms
- Order: Nymphaeales
- Family: Nymphaeaceae
- Genus: Euryale
- Species: †E. ucrainica

Binomial name
- †Euryale ucrainica A.G. Negru

Fossil species of flowering plant

Euryale ucrainica is a fossil species of Euryale from the upper Miocene of Bolgrad, Odesa, Ukraine.

== Taxonomy ==
It was published by Andrei Grigorievich Negru in 1979.

== Etymology ==
The specific epithet ucrainica means Ukrainian or from Ukraine.

== Distribution ==
It occurred in Ukraine.
