= Euryale akashiensis =

Euryale akashiensis Temporal range: Pliocene

Scientific classification
- Kingdom: Plantae
- Clade: Tracheophytes
- Clade: Angiosperms
- Order: Nymphaeales
- Family: Nymphaeaceae
- Genus: Euryale
- Species: †E. akashiensis

Binomial name
- †Euryale akashiensis Miki

Extinct species of flowering plant

Euryale akashiensis is a fossil species of Euryale from the Pliocene of Akashi, Hyōgo, Japan.

== Description ==
The ovate, 7–9 mm long, and 6–8 mm wide seeds have a gnarled testa.

== Taxonomy ==
It was first published as Euryale akashiensis Miki by Miki Shigeru in 1937. It has been proposed to place it in a separate genus Pseudoeuryale P.I. Dorof. as Pseudoeuryale akashiensis (Miki) Doweld published by Alexander Borisovitch Doweld in 2022. The lectotype was collected in Nakayagi-Yagi, Akashi City, Hyogo Prefecture, Japan.

== Distribution ==
It occurred in Japan.
