= Euryale yunnanensis =

Euryale yunnanensis Temporal range: Late Miocene

Scientific classification
- Kingdom: Plantae
- Clade: Tracheophytes
- Clade: Angiosperms
- Order: Nymphaeales
- Family: Nymphaeaceae
- Genus: Euryale
- Species: †E. yunnanensis

Binomial name
- †Euryale yunnanensis Y. Huang & Z. Zhou

Extinct species of flowering plant

Euryale yunnanensis is a fossil species of Euryale from the Late Miocene of Yunnan, China.

== Description ==
The relatively small, elliptic or ellipsoidal, 5–8 mm long, and 4–6 mm wide seeds with a smooth surface have a circular germination cap.

== Taxonomy ==
It was published by Yongjiang Huang and Zhekun Zhou in 2015. The type specimen was collected from the Shuitangba village in Zhaotong, Yunnan, China.

== Etymology ==
The specific epithet yunnanensis refers Yunnan, China.

== Ecology ==
It is an aquatic plant.
