= Euryale bielorussica =

Euryale bielorussica Temporal range: Pleistocene

Scientific classification
- Kingdom: Plantae
- Clade: Tracheophytes
- Clade: Angiosperms
- Order: Nymphaeales
- Family: Nymphaeaceae
- Genus: Euryale
- Species: †E. bielorussica

Binomial name
- †Euryale bielorussica Wieliczk.

Fossil species of flowering plant

Euryale bielorussica is a fossil species of Euryale from the Pleistocene of the Minsk region, Belarus.

== Description ==
The ovoid to irregularly spherical, 6.6–9.5 mm long, and 5.3–9.0 mm wide seeds have a slightly narrowed apex.

== Taxonomy ==
It was published by Felix Julianowicz Wieliczkiewicz in 1980. The type specimen was found in the quarry of a brick factory in the Minsk region.

== Distribution ==
It occurred in Belarus.
