= Euryale tenuicostata =

Euryale tenuicostata Temporal range: Miocene

Scientific classification
- Kingdom: Plantae
- Clade: Tracheophytes
- Clade: Angiosperms
- Order: Nymphaeales
- Family: Nymphaeaceae
- Genus: Euryale
- Species: †E. tenuicostata

Binomial name
- †Euryale tenuicostata P.I. Dorof.

Fossil species of flowering plant

Euryale tenuicostata is a fossil species of Euryale from the Miocene of Omsk, Russia.

== Description ==
The ovoid to oval, 4.3–7.6 mm long, and 2.9–7.1 mm wide seeds have a slightly wrinkled testa.

== Taxonomy ==
It was first published as Euryale tenuicostata P.I. Dorof. by Pavel Ivanovich Dorofeev in 1959. It has been proposed to place it in a separate genus Irtyshenia P.I. Dorof. as Irtyshenia tenuicostata (P.I. Dorof.) P.I. Dorof. published by Pavel Ivanovich Dorofeev in 1972. Later it was proposed to place it in the genus Pseudoeuryale P.I. Dorof. as Pseudoeuryale tenuicostata (P.I. Dorof.) Doweld published by Alexander Borisovitch Doweld in 2022.

== Distribution ==
Fossils of E. tenuicostata occur in what is now Russia.
