= Hałuszowa =

- Village
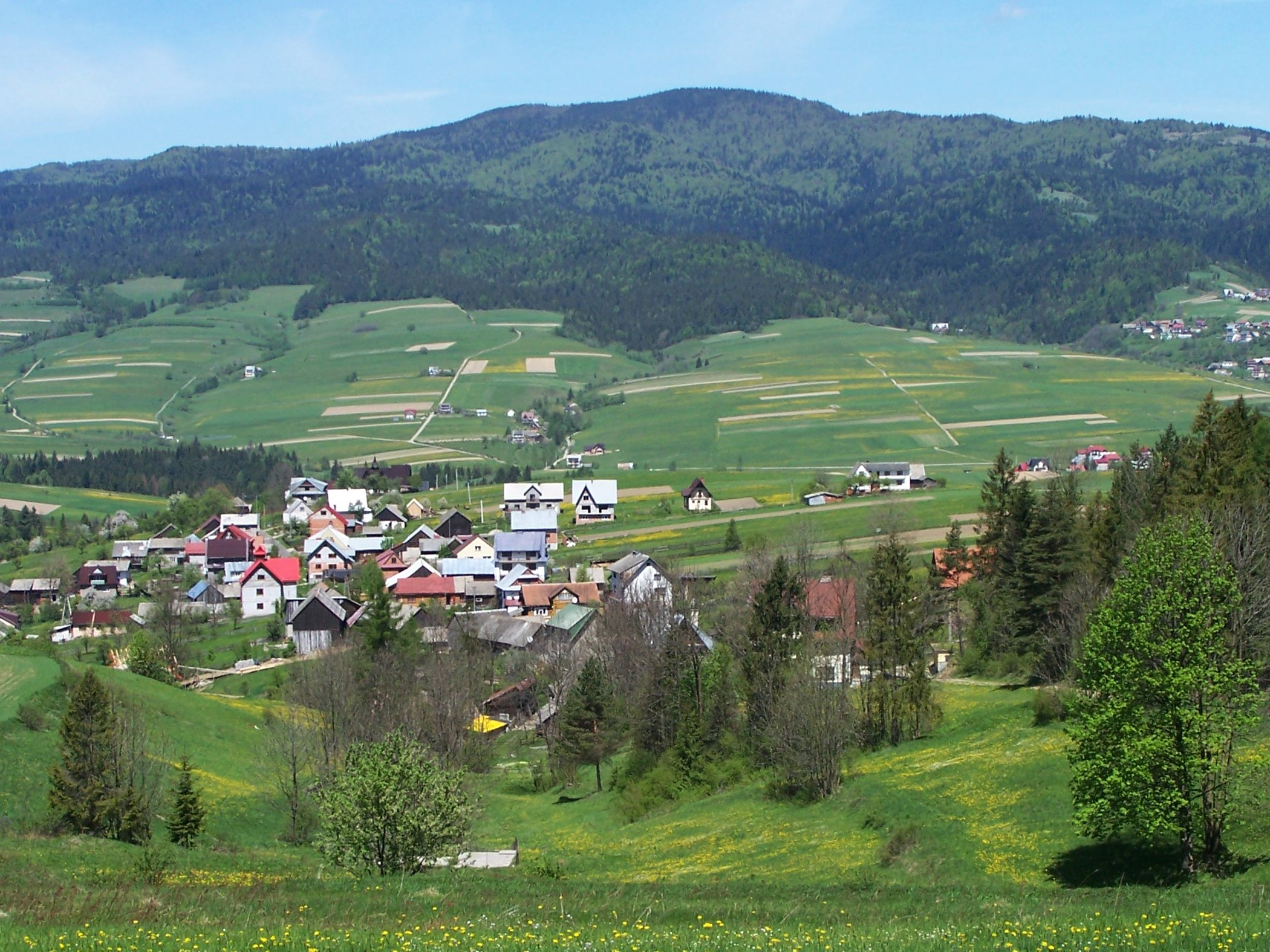
- Hałuszowa as seen from Lubań

- Location within Poland
- Coordinates: 49°26′N 20°22′E
- Country: Poland
- Voivodeship: Lesser Poland
- County: Nowy Targ
- Gmina: Krościenko nad Dunajcem

Hałuszowa [xawuˈʂɔva] is a village in the administrative district of Gmina Krościenko nad Dunajcem, within Nowy Targ County, Lesser Poland Voivodeship, in southern Poland, close to the border with Slovakia.
