= Gmina Krościenko nad Dunajcem =

Gmina Krościenko nad Dunajcem Krościenko nad Dunajcem Commune
- Gmina
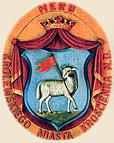
- Coat of arms
- Interactive map of Gmina Krościenko nad Dunajcem
- Coordinates (Krościenko nad Dunajcem): 49°26′N 20°25′E
- Country: Poland
- Voivodeship: Lesser Poland
- County: Nowy Targ
- Seat: Krościenko nad Dunajcem

Area
  - Total: 57.27 km^{2} (22.11 sq mi)

Population (2006)
  - Total: 6,465
  - Density: 112.9/km^{2} (292.4/sq mi)
- Website: https://www.kroscienko-nad-dunajcem.pl/

Gmina Krościenko nad Dunajcem is a rural gmina (administrative district) in Nowy Targ County, Lesser Poland Voivodeship, in southern Poland, on the Slovak border. Its seat is the village of Krościenko nad Dunajcem, which lies approximately 30 kilometres (19 mi) east of Nowy Targ and 78 km (48 mi) south-east of the regional capital Kraków.

The gmina covers an area of 57.27 square kilometres (22.1 sq mi), and as of 2006 its total population is 6,465.

== Villages ==
Gmina Krościenko nad Dunajcem contains the villages and settlements of Biały Potok, Dziadowe Kąty, Grywałd, Hałuszowa, Kąty, Krościenko nad Dunajcem, Krośnica, Niwki and Tylka.

== Neighbouring gminas ==
Gmina Krościenko nad Dunajcem is bordered by the town of Szczawnica and by the gminas of Czorsztyn, Łącko and Ochotnica Dolna. It also borders Slovakia.
