= Biały Potok =

- Village
- Location within Poland
- Coordinates: 49°26′8″N 20°23′43″E
- Country: Poland
- Voivodeship: Lesser Poland
- County: Nowy Targ
- Gmina: Krościenko nad Dunajcem

Biały Potok [ˈbjawɨ ˈpɔtɔk] is a part of a village Krościenko nad Dunajcem in the administrative district of Gmina Krościenko nad Dunajcem, within Nowy Targ County, Lesser Poland Voivodeship, in southern Poland, close to the border with Slovakia.
