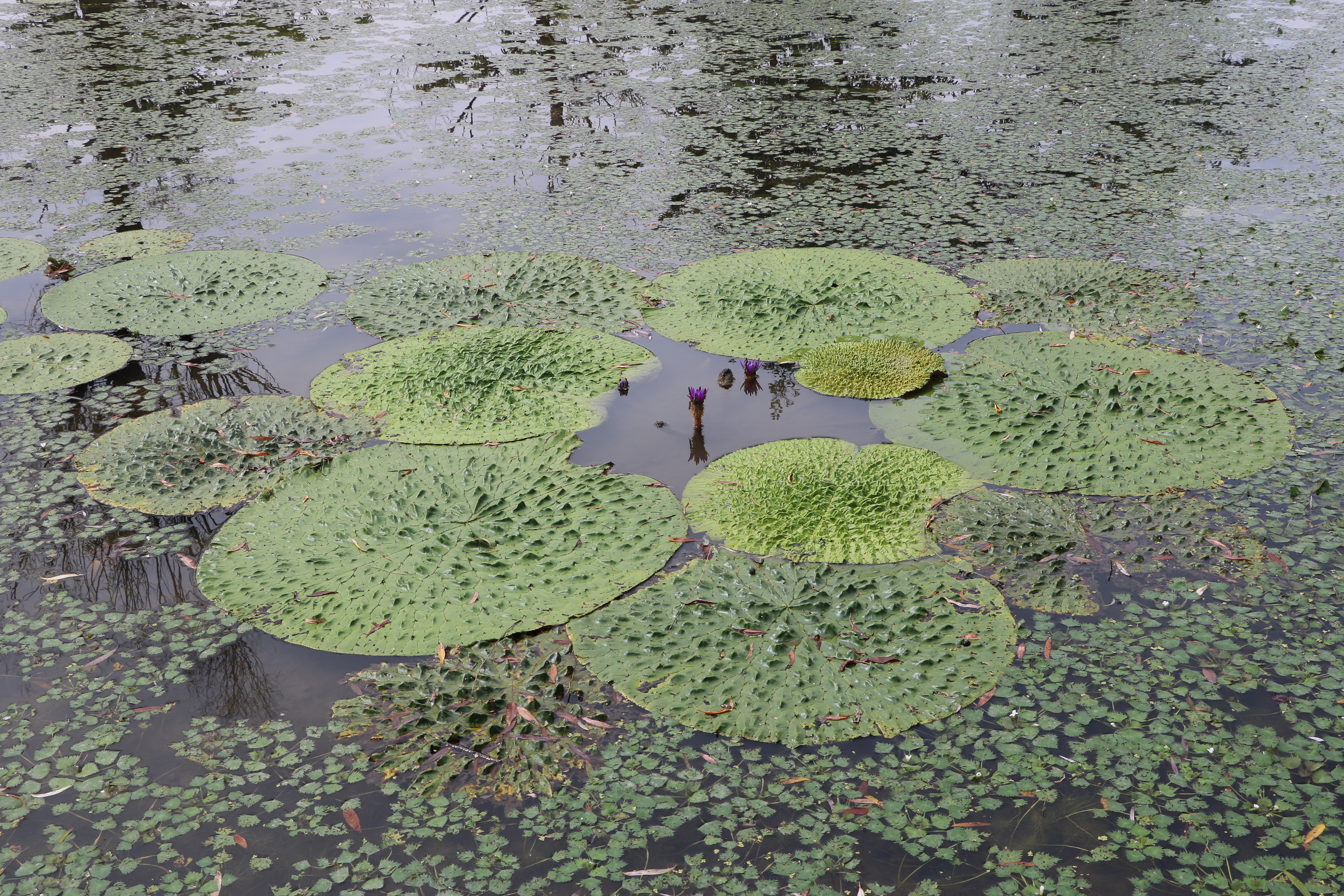
- Euryale ferox in Himi, Toyama, Japan
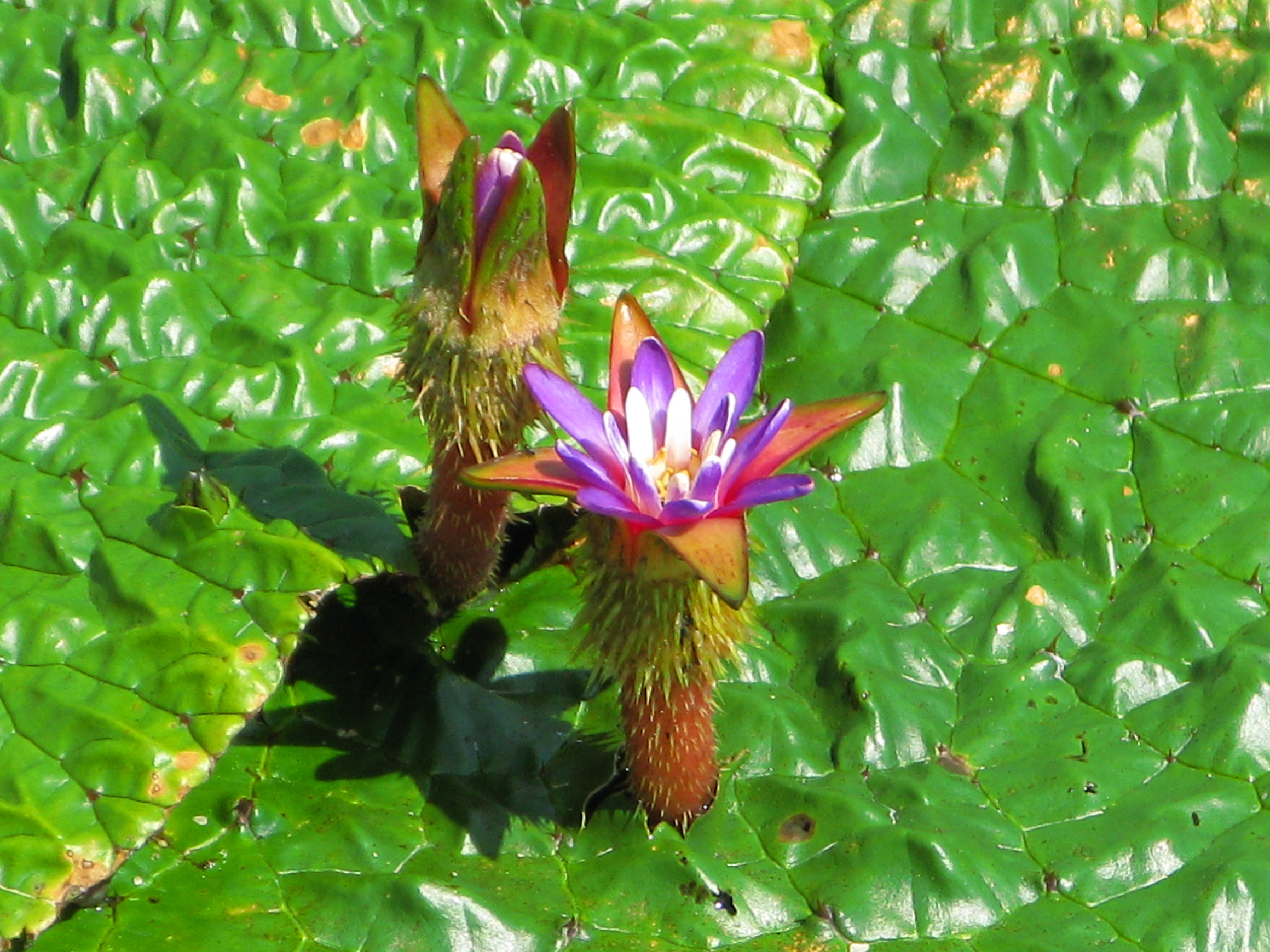
- Flower

Conservation status
- Least Concern (IUCN 3.1)

Scientific classification
- Kingdom: Plantae
- Clade: Tracheophytes
- Clade: Angiosperms
- Order: Nymphaeales
- Family: Nymphaeaceae
- Genus: Euryale; Salisb.
- Species: E. ferox

Binomial name
- Euryale ferox Salisb.

Synonyms
- Anneslea spinosa Andrews; Euryale ferox f. ussuriense Regel; Euryale indica Planch.

= Euryale ferox =

Species of flowering plant

Euryale ferox, commonly known as prickly waterlily, makhānā, or Gorgon plant, is a species of water lily found in southern and eastern Asia, and the only extant member of the genus Euryale. The edible seeds, called fox nuts or gorgon nuts, are dried and eaten predominantly in Asia.

The plant is cultivated for its seeds in lowland ponds in India, China, and Japan. The Indian state of Bihar produces 90% of the world's fox nuts. The Chinese have cultivated the plant for centuries. In India, more than 96,000 hectares of Bihar were set aside for cultivation of Euryale in 1990–1991. In the northern and western parts of India, the seeds are often roasted or fried like popcorn.

== Description ==
Euryale ferox grows in freshwater ponds. The leaves are large, round and peltate, often more than 1 m (3 ft) across, sometimes to 2.7 m (9 ft) diameter, with a distinctive puckered top. The stalk is at the centre on the underside. The leaves are deep green; the leaf veins are purplish. The stems and leaves are covered in sharp prickles. The flowers are 5 cm diameter, with violet outer petals and white inner petals; they often pierce through the leaves. The fruit is a spiny capsule 5–10 cm diameter, containing numerous spongy-textured seeds. It grows in rich soil under water. It does not tolerate shade or cold during the growing season, though when dormant in winter it is not harmed by severe winter cold.

== Reproduction and genomics ==
Euryale ferox is capable of self-pollination. Pollen is released before the flower opens. The majority of Euryale ferox flowers are cleistogamous, not opening for cross-pollination, though some normally-opening (chasmogamous) flowers do occur.

The chromosome count is n = 29. The genome size is 870.42 Mb. The chloroplast genome is 159930 bp long.

== Cultivation ==
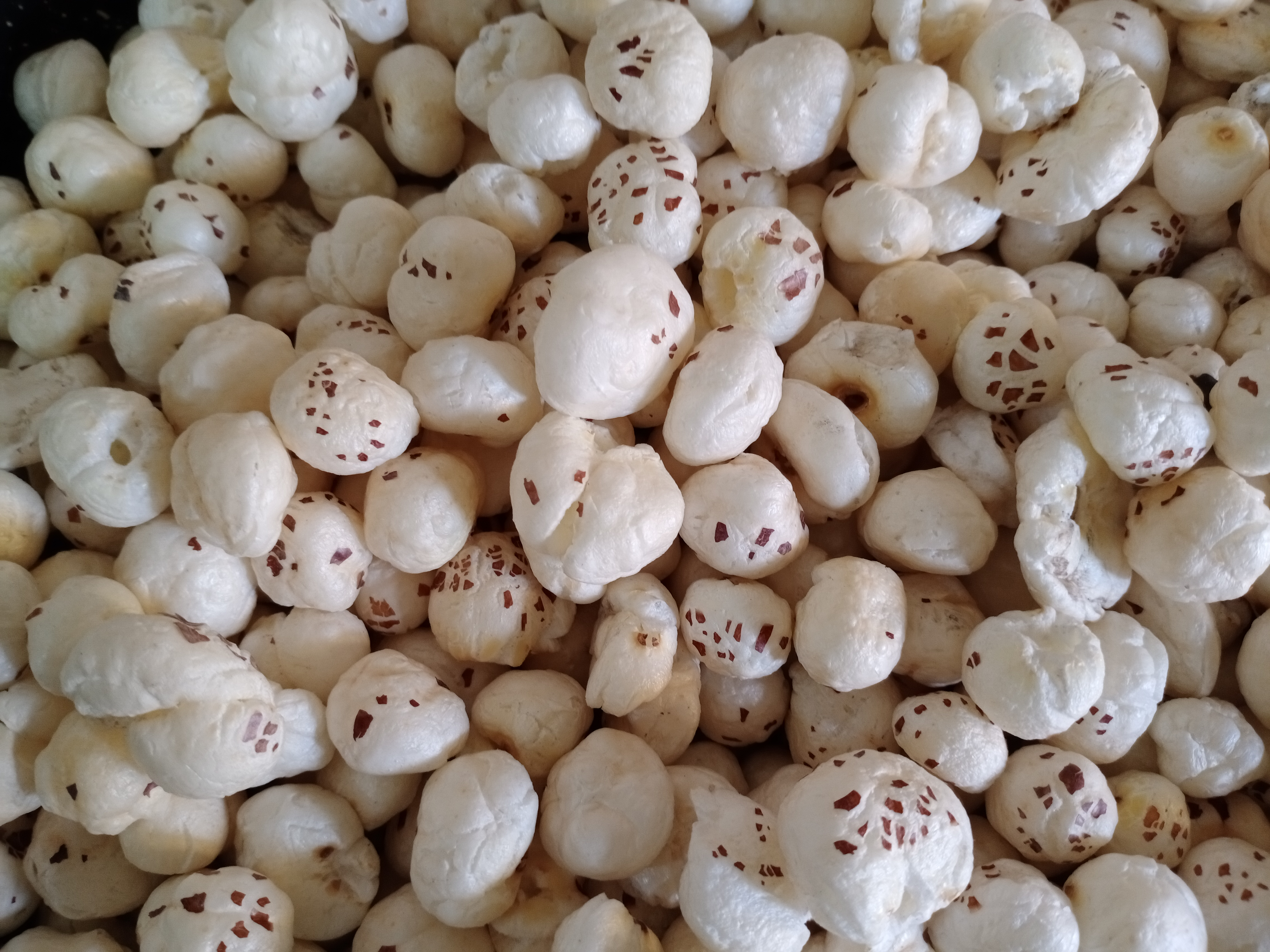
Lightly roasted puffed makhana

The seeds and petioles are used as food. In India, more than 96,000 hectares of Bihar, where the local variety (and the nuts it produces) is called Mithila Makhana, were set aside for cultivation of Euryale in 1990–1991. India is the largest global producer of Makhana (fox nut), with over 90% of cultivation concentrated in the floodplain regions of Bihar, particularly in districts like Darbhanga, Madhubani, and Purnia. Makhana has also emerged as a key agri-export commodity, valued for its nutritional profile and geographical indication. In the northern and western parts of India, Euryale ferox seeds are often roasted or fried like popcorn. In other types of cooking, they form a porridge or pudding called kheer. The seeds are used in Cantonese soup, in Ayurveda preparations, and in traditional Chinese medicine. The seeds accumulate any toxic metals present in the water.

Evidence from archaeobotany indicates that Euryale ferox was a frequently collected wild food source during the Neolithic period in the Yangtze region, with many finds from the sites of Kuahuqiao, Hemudu, and Tianluoshan. The earliest recorded use of E. ferox is from Gesher Benot Ya'aqov, Israel, among artifacts of the Acheulean culture 750–790,000 years ago.

Fox nuts have traditionally been harvested by diving without breathing equipment to a depth of 2.4 m (7 ft 10 in) in freshwater ponds. This is arduous, with skin hazards from mud and the plant's thorns. In the 21st century, the National Research Centre for Makhana has pioneered the plant's cultivation in fields flooded to a depth of 30 cm (12 in) which makes production and harvesting easier. The area of land devoted to fox nut production had increased to 35,000 ha (86,000 acres) by 2022. The centre has developed a more productive variety, increasing farm income, and is designing a harvesting machine.

== Taxonomy ==
The species was described by Richard Anthony Salisbury in 1805. It is a member of the water lily family Nymphaeaceae. It is the type species of its genus. In 1811, Henry Cranke Andrews described Anneslea spinosa, now treated as a synonym of E. ferox. In 1853, Jules Émile Planchon described Euryale indica, now also treated as a synonym. The placement in a separate family Euryalaceae J.Agardh, which was proposed by Jacob Georg Agardh in 1858, has been rejected. Unlike other water lilies, the pollen grains of Euryale have three nuclei.

The genus is named after a mythical Greek monster, the Gorgon Euryale. The specific epithet ferox means fierce or ferocious in Latin. मखाना ("Makhanā") is the Hindi name for the plant.

== Distribution ==
Euryale ferox is a perennial plant native to a range from northern India to Taiwan and through China, Korea, and Japan to far eastern Russia.

In 2022, E. ferox was recorded as naturalised in Serbia, probably dispersed from plants grown in botanical gardens by migrating birds.

== Conservation status ==
The species is classified on the Red List of endangered plants in Japan and given the designation "vulnerable", as it is threatened both by water pollution and by land reclamation there. It is similarly rated as vulnerable (VU) in South Korea. It is classified as a species of Least Concern (LC) in the IUCN Red List of Threatened Species due to its extensive use and cultivation in China. However, a global population decline has been reported.

== Gallery ==
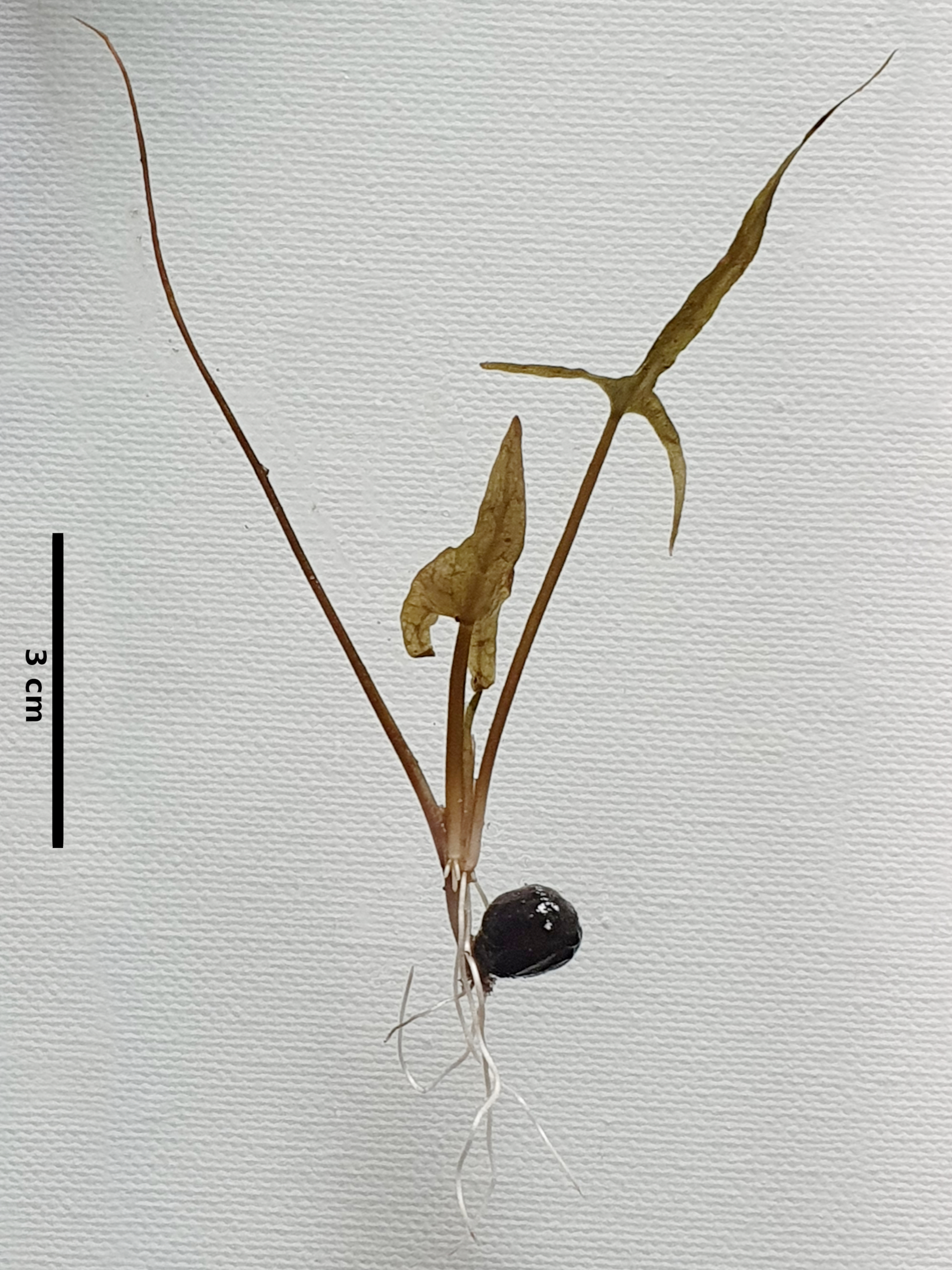
Seedling (herbarium specimen)

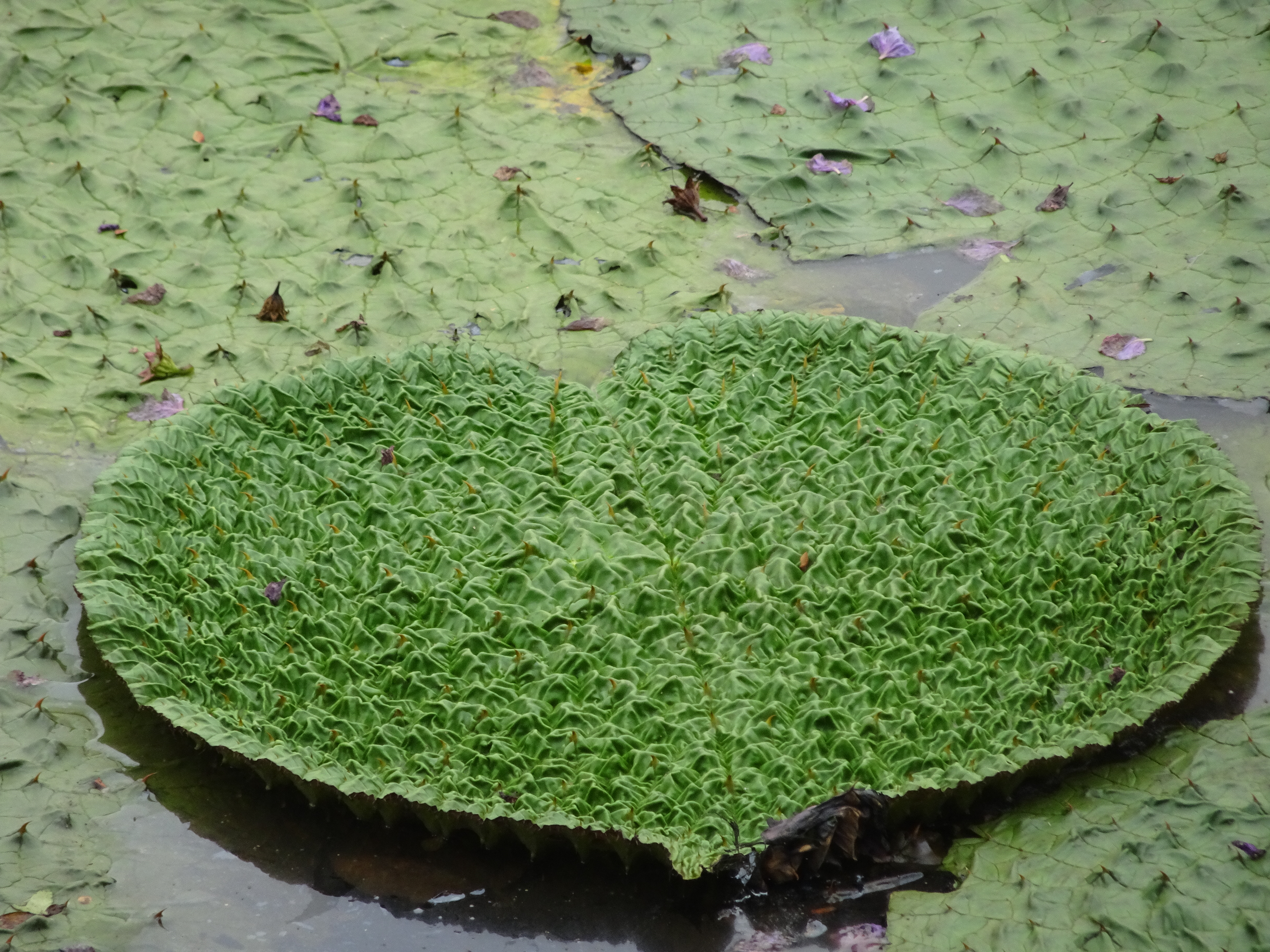
Unfurling leaf at Kanjia Lake, Odisha, India

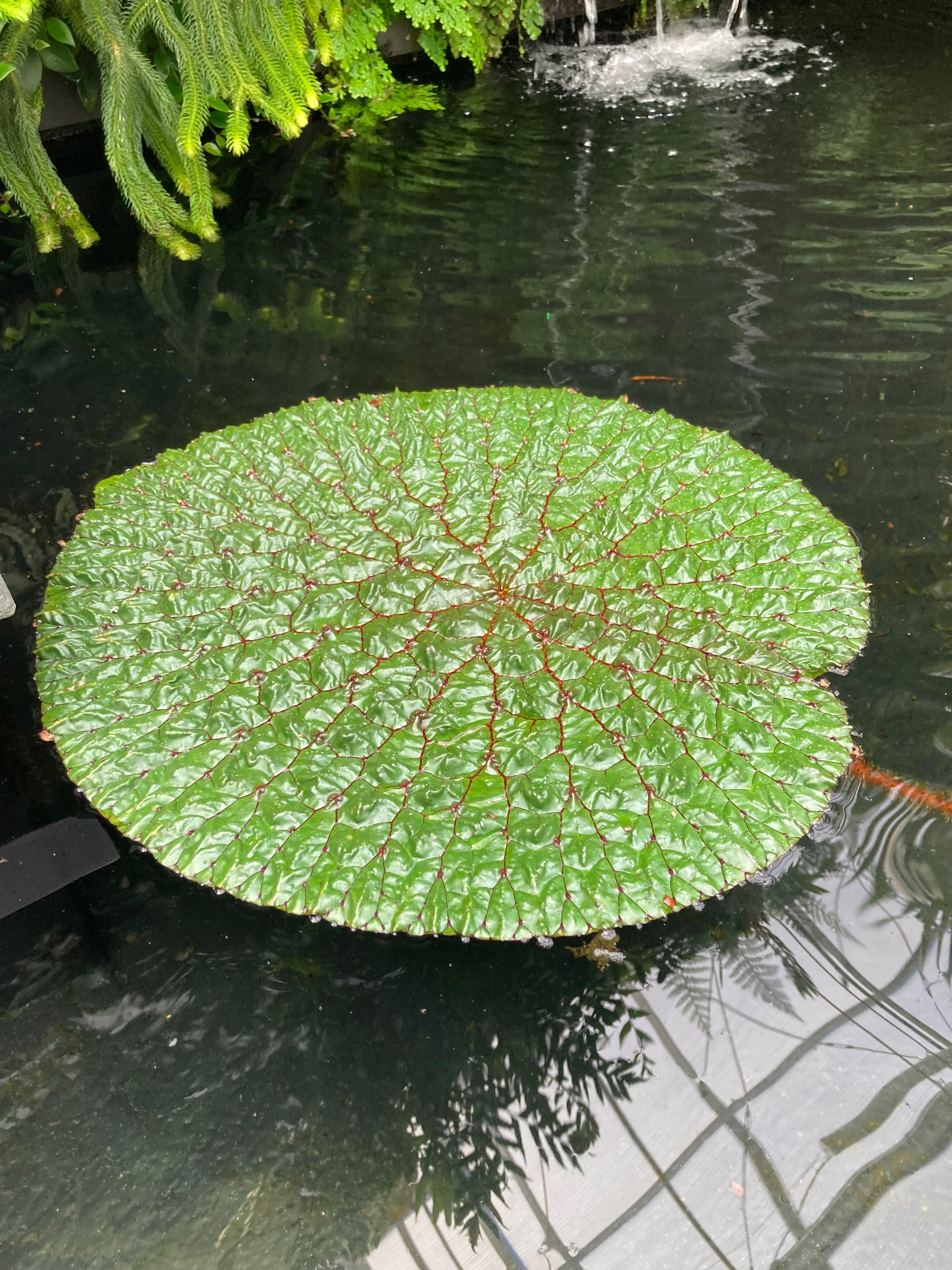
Leaf at UC Berkeley Botanical Garden

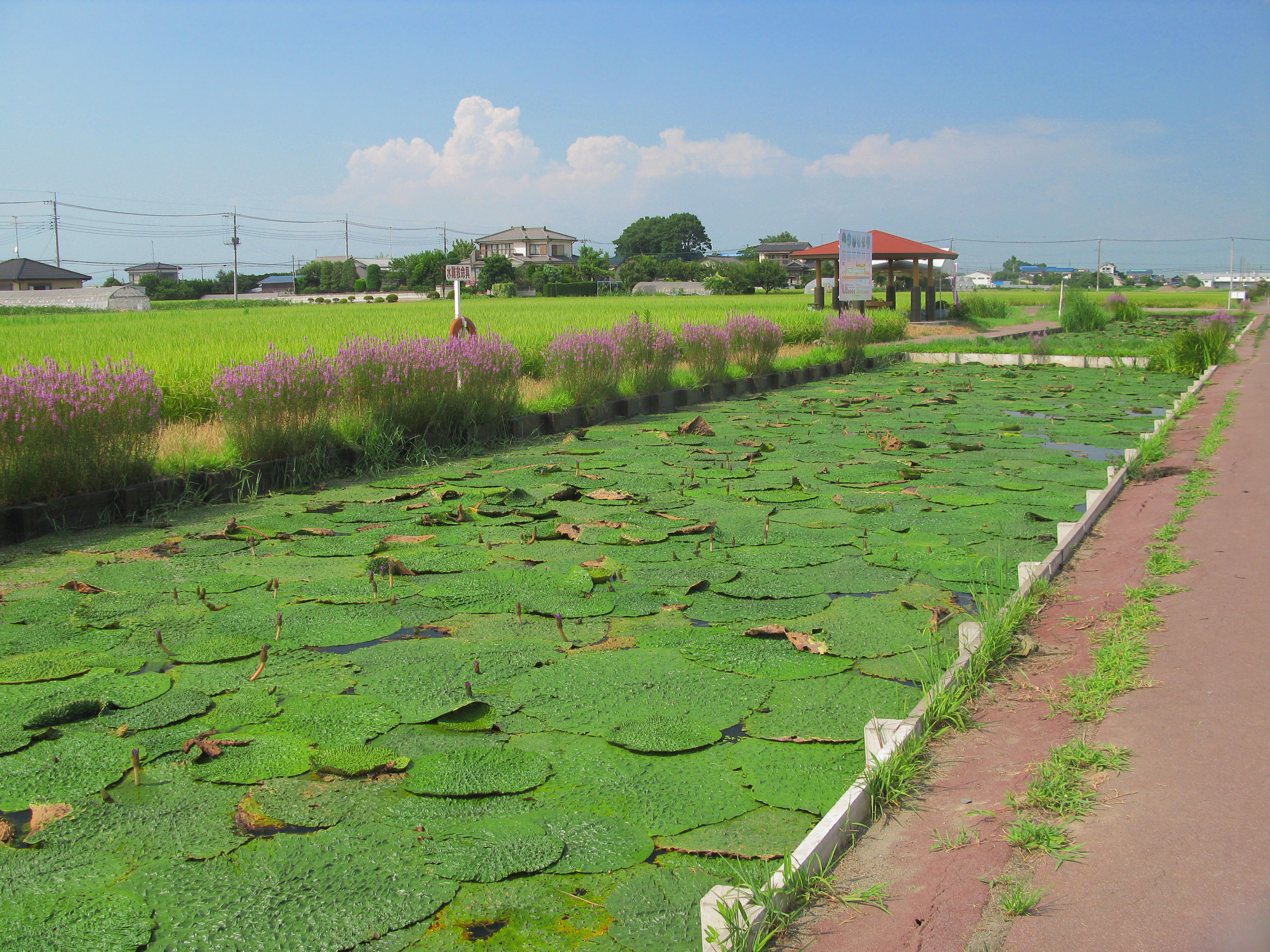
A pond of commercially cultivated Euryale in Japan

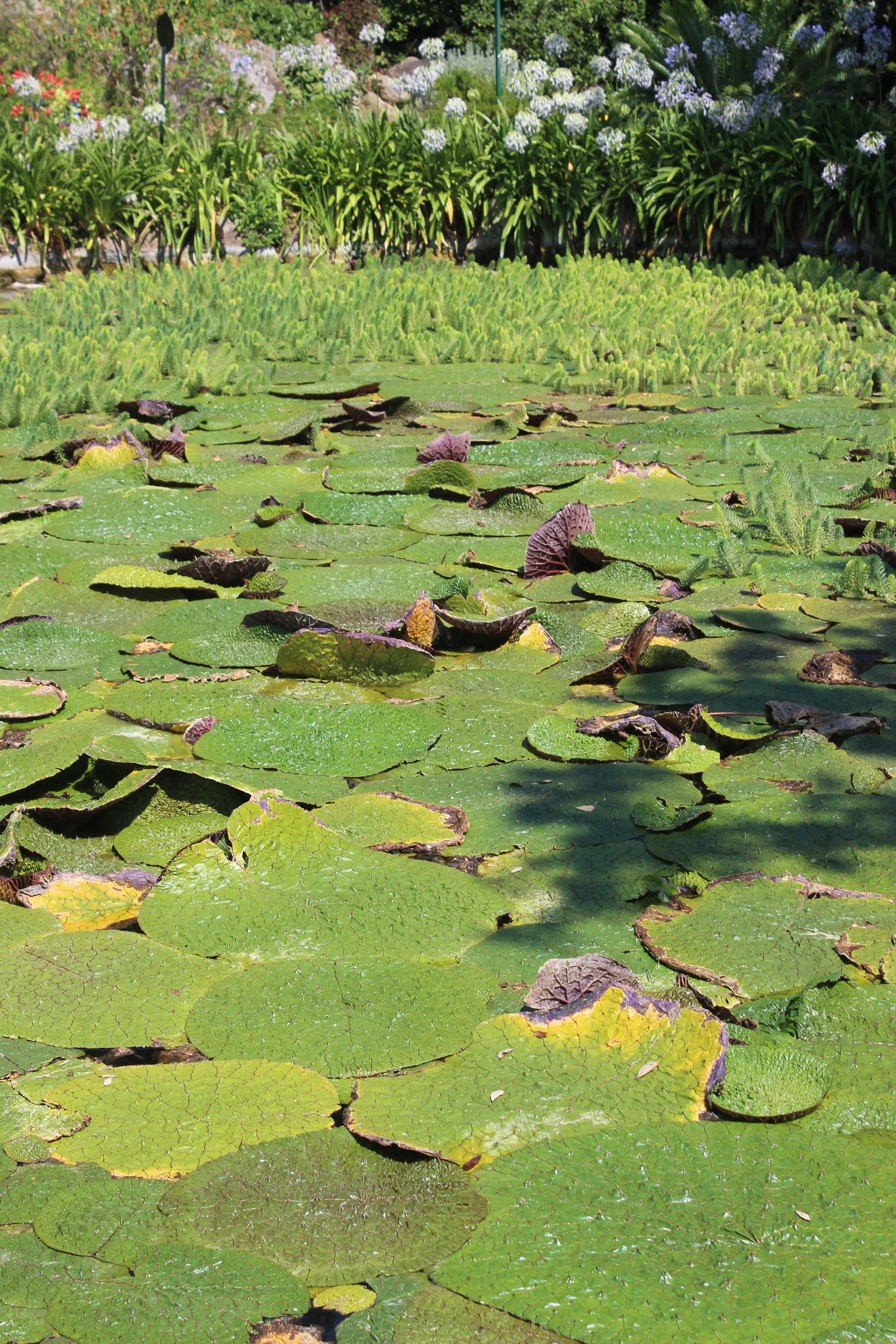
Grown as an ornamental plant in Italy

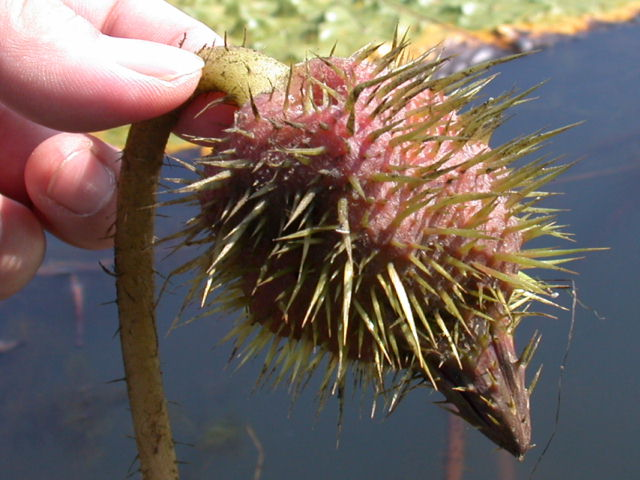
Fruit

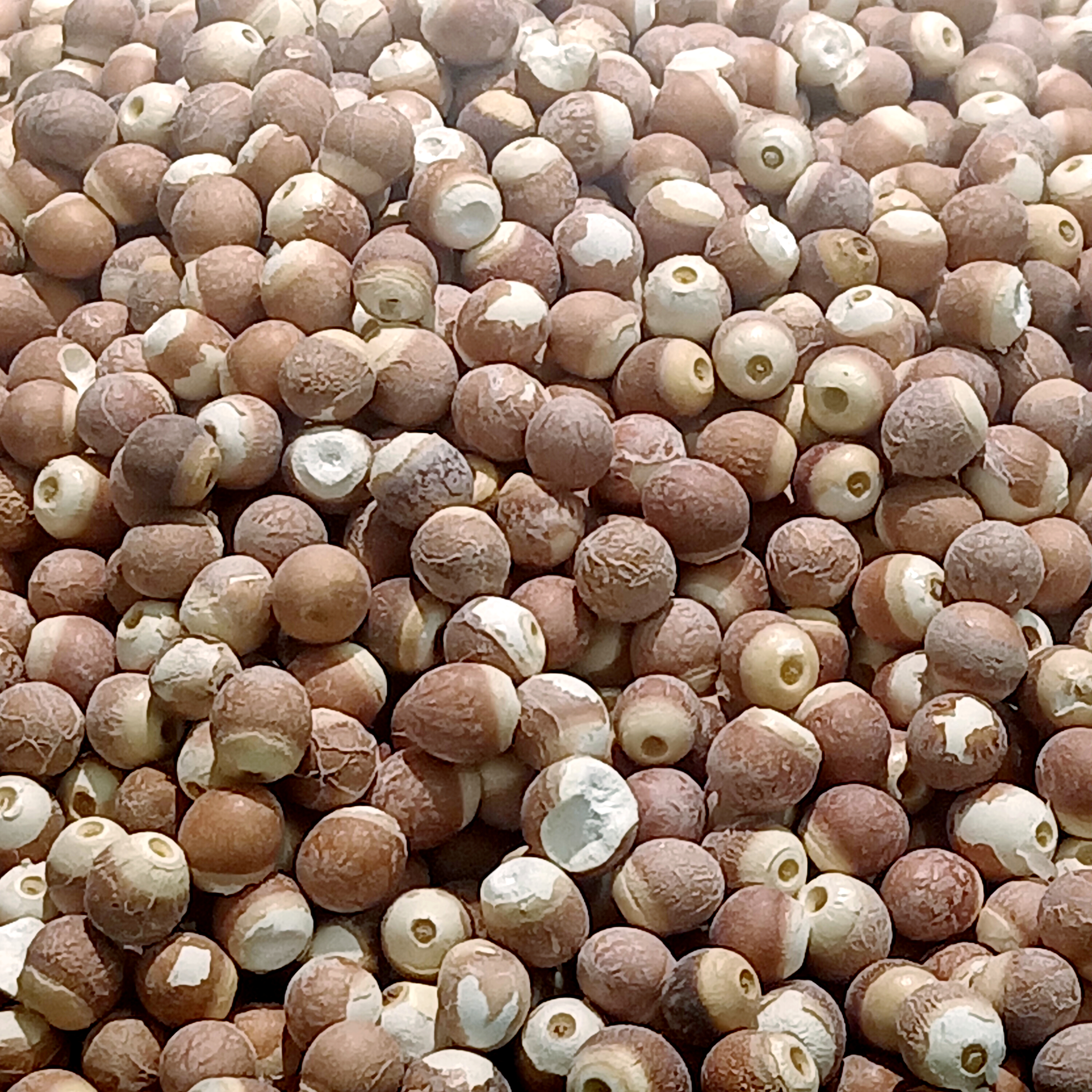
Harvested seeds

== See also ==
- Water chestnut – another aquatic plant with edible nuts
