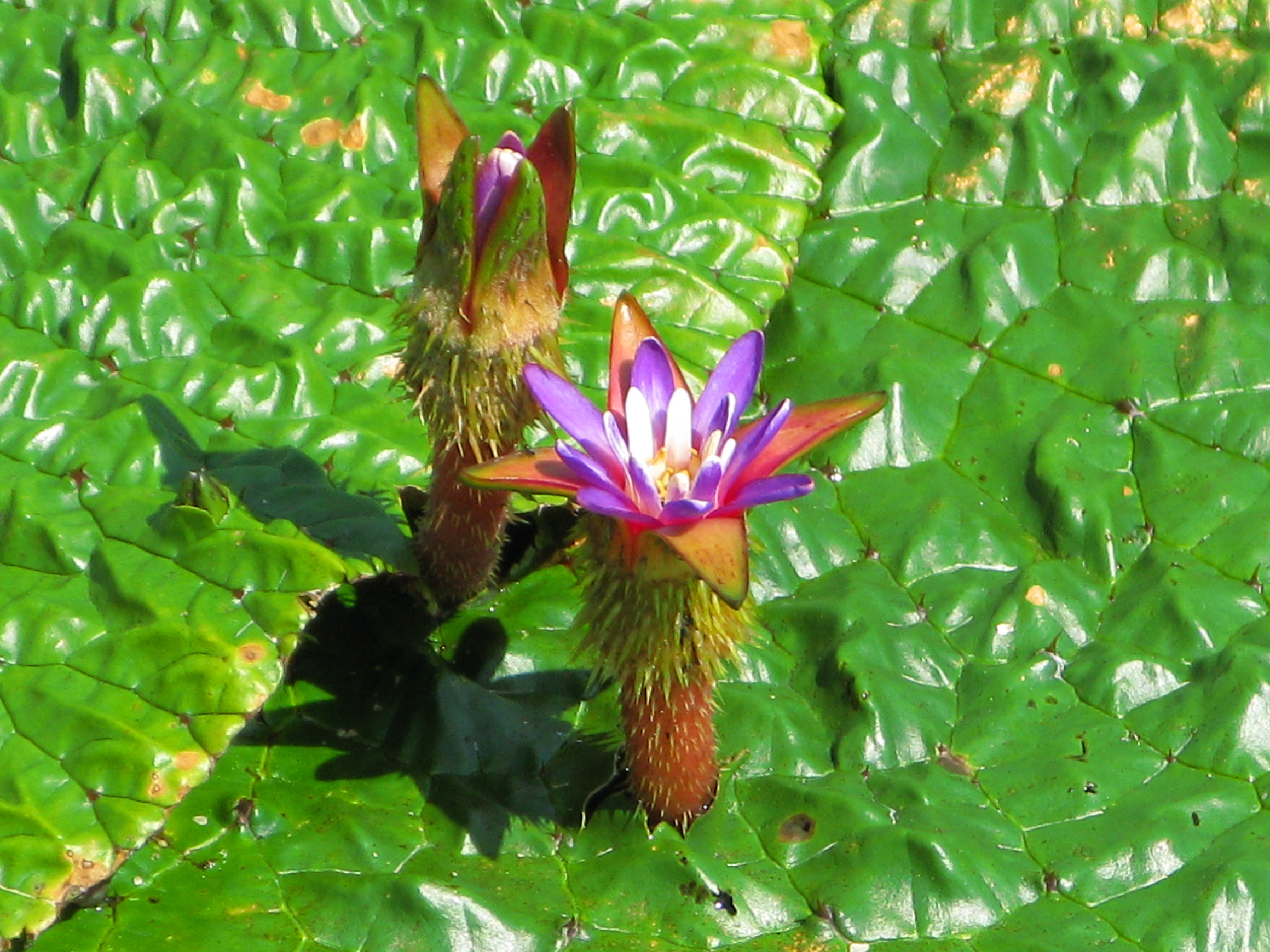
- Flowering Euryale ferox cultivated at the Kodai Hasu no Sato park in Gyoda City, Saitama Prefecture, Japan

Scientific classification
- Kingdom: Plantae
- Clade: Tracheophytes
- Clade: Angiosperms
- Order: Nymphaeales
- Family: Nymphaeaceae
- Genus: Euryale; Salisb.

Type species
- Euryale ferox Salisb. ex K.D. Koenig & Sims

Species
- see here

Synonyms
- Anneslea Roxb. ex Andrews

= Euryale (plant) =

Euryale Temporal range: Miocene–Holocene

Genus of aquatic plants

Euryale is a genus of flowering plants of the family Nymphaeaceae.

== Description ==
=== Vegetative characteristics ===
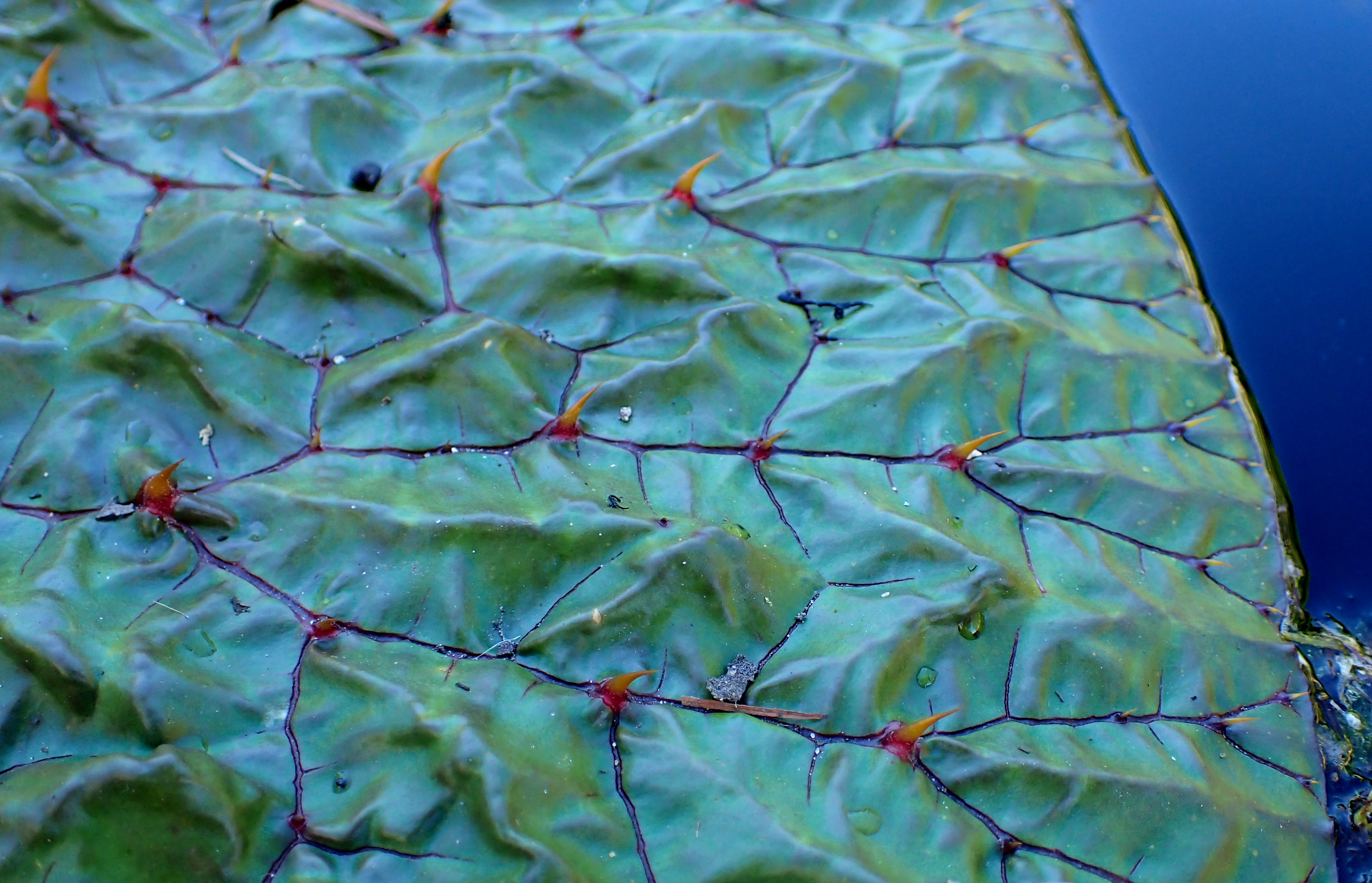
Adaxial leaf surface of Euryale ferox with numerous prickles

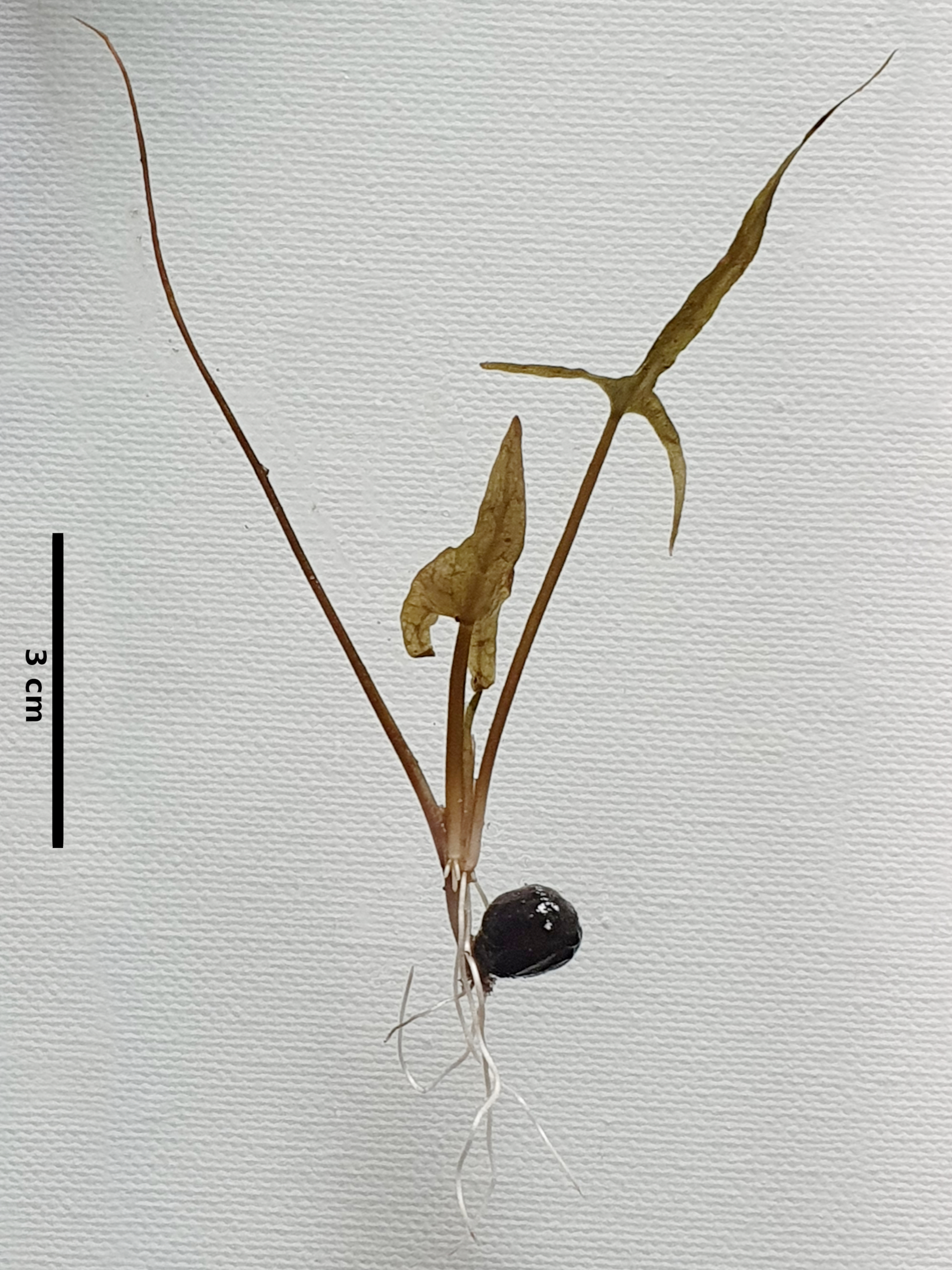
Euryale ferox seedling with 3 cm scale bar

Euryale is an annual or perennial, rhizomatous, aquatic herb with erect, unbranched rhizomes. The adaxial leaf surface is green, and features prickles at the veins. The abaxial leaf surface is violet and displays prominent, prickly venation. The thin, sharp prickles are 3–11 mm long, and 1–2 mm wide at the base.

=== Generative characteristics ===
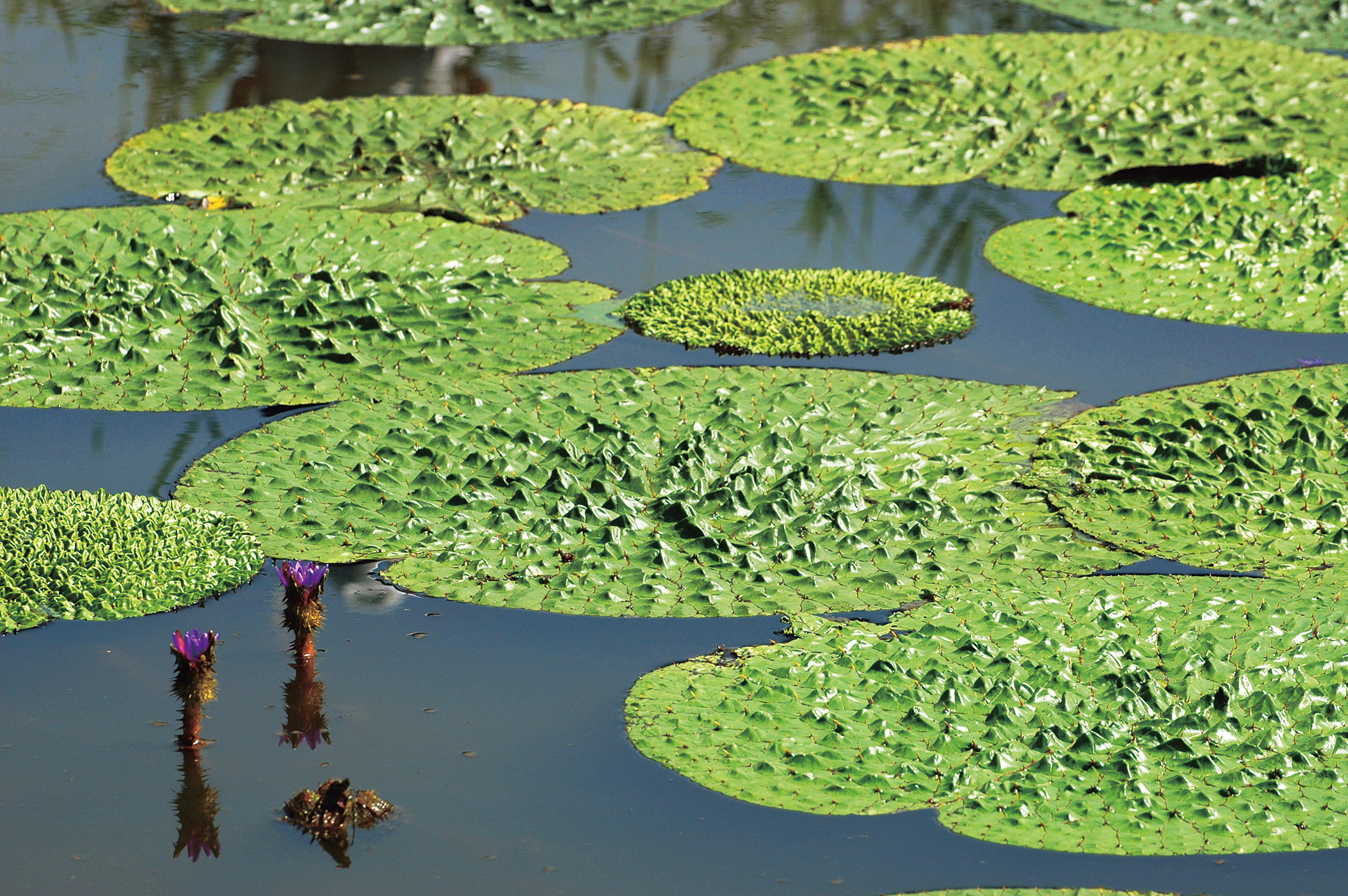
Euryale ferox growing in Niigata City, Japan

The pedunculate, 5 cm wide flowers have prickly peduncles and sepals. The flowers have four persistent sepals. The gynoecium consists of 7–16 carpels. The prickly fruit bears 8–20 black, arillate, spherical, ovate, obovate, or ellipsoidal 6-10 mm wide seeds with a hard, smooth, wrinkled, gnarled, or irregularly ridged testa.

=== Cytology ===
The chromosome count of Euryale ferox is 2n = 58.

== Taxonomy ==
It was published by Richard Anthony Salisbury in 1805. with Euryale ferox Salisb. ex K.D. Koenig & Sims as the type species.

=== Species ===
It has one extant species:

- Euryale ferox Salisb.

=== Fossil species ===
Euryale seeds and prickles are well preserved in the fossil record and pollen fossils are known as well. Today, Euryale only occurs in the region spanning from Northern India to the Russian Far East, and extends to temperate East Asia but the fossil record shows it was once also present in central Europe. It is known from the Miocene of Poland, Russia, China, Germany, and the United Kingdom, from the Pliocene of the Netherlands, Poland, Germany, and Italy, and lastly, from the Pleistocene of Russia, Germany, Poland, Japan, China, Belgium, and Belarus.

Several fossil species have been described:

- †Euryale akashiensis Miki
- †Euryale bielorussica Wieliczk.
- †Euryale carpatica Szafer
- †Euryale europaea C. A. Weber
- †Euryale limburgensis C. & E. In. Reid.
- †Euryale lissa Reid
- †Euryale nodulosa C. & E. M. Reid
- †Euryale spinosa J.B. Simpson
- †Euryale sukaczevii Dorof.
- †Euryale tenuicostata Dorof.
- †Euryale ucrainica A.G. Negru
- †Euryale yunnanensis Y. Huang & Z. Zhou

The placement of some of the fossil species is however disputed, as it has been proposed to move several species to the genus †Pseudoeuryale P.I. Dorof.

=== Evolutionary relationships ===
Together with the genus Victoria, Euryale may be placed within the genus Nymphaea, rendering it paraphyletic in its current circumscription. The lineage of Euryale and Victoria diverged from the lineage of Nymphaea subg. Lotos and Nymphaea subg. Hydrocallis in the Miocene and subsequently the lineages of Euryale and Victoria diverged from each other also in the Miocene.

== Distribution and habitat ==
Euryale is found in the area that stretches from Northern India to the Russian Far East and extends into temperate East Asia, where it occurs in ponds, lakes, rice fields, and marshes. Recently, it has also been recorded in Serbia, Europe. It was likely dispersed to Serbia through migrating birds.

== Ecology ==
Flies and solitary bees visit the flowers of Euryale ferox.

== Conservation ==
The IUCN conservation status of Euryale ferox is least concern (LC).

== Use ==
The seeds and petioles are used as food.
