= Tylka =

- Village
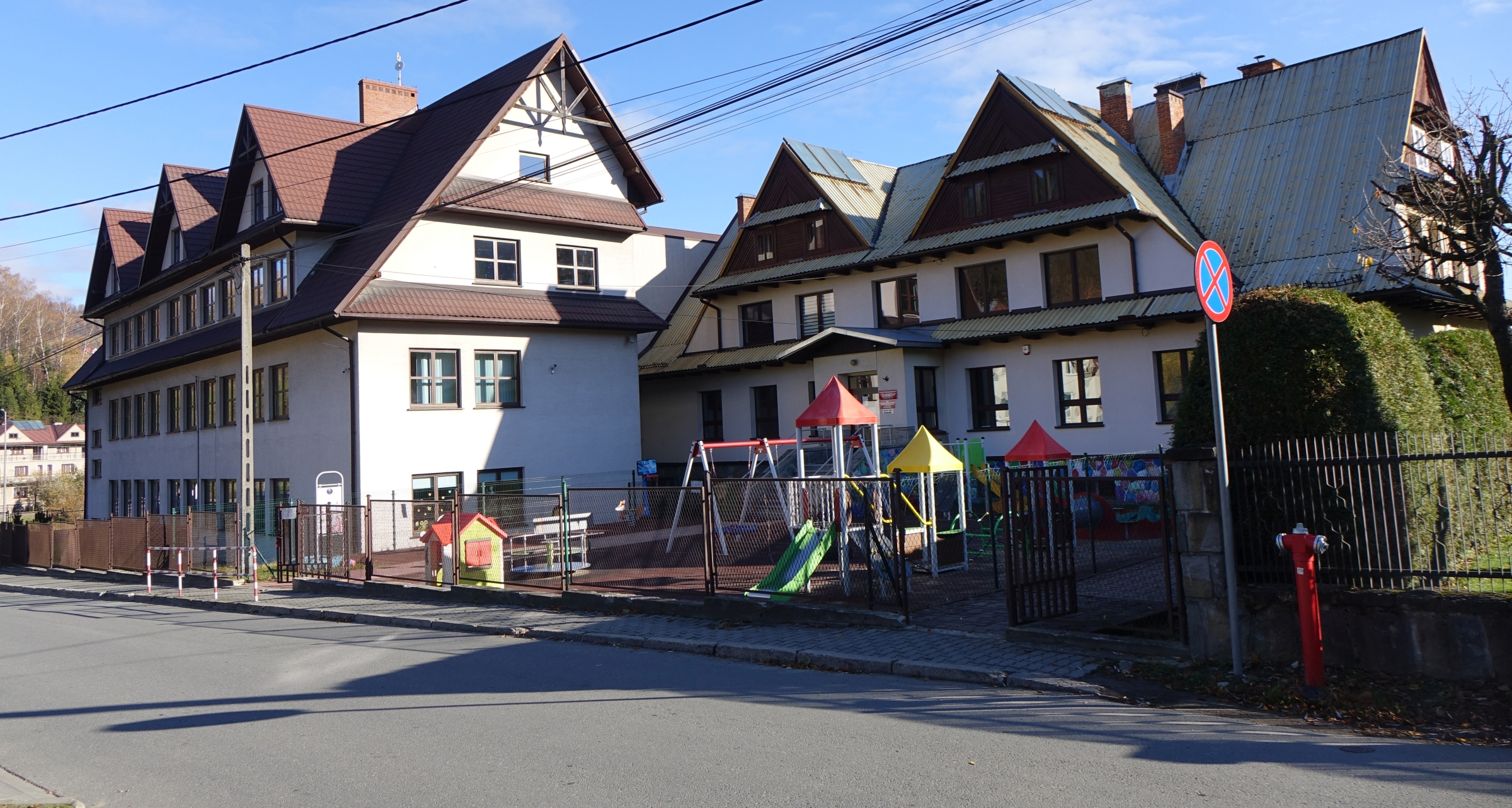
- School

- Location within Poland
- Coordinates: 49°25′58″N 20°23′14″E
- Country: Poland
- Voivodeship: Lesser Poland
- County: Nowy Targ
- Gmina: Krościenko nad Dunajcem

Tylka [ˈtɨlka] is a village in the administrative district of Gmina Krościenko nad Dunajcem, within Nowy Targ County, Lesser Poland Voivodeship, in southern Poland, close to the border with Slovakia.
