= Grywałd =

- Village
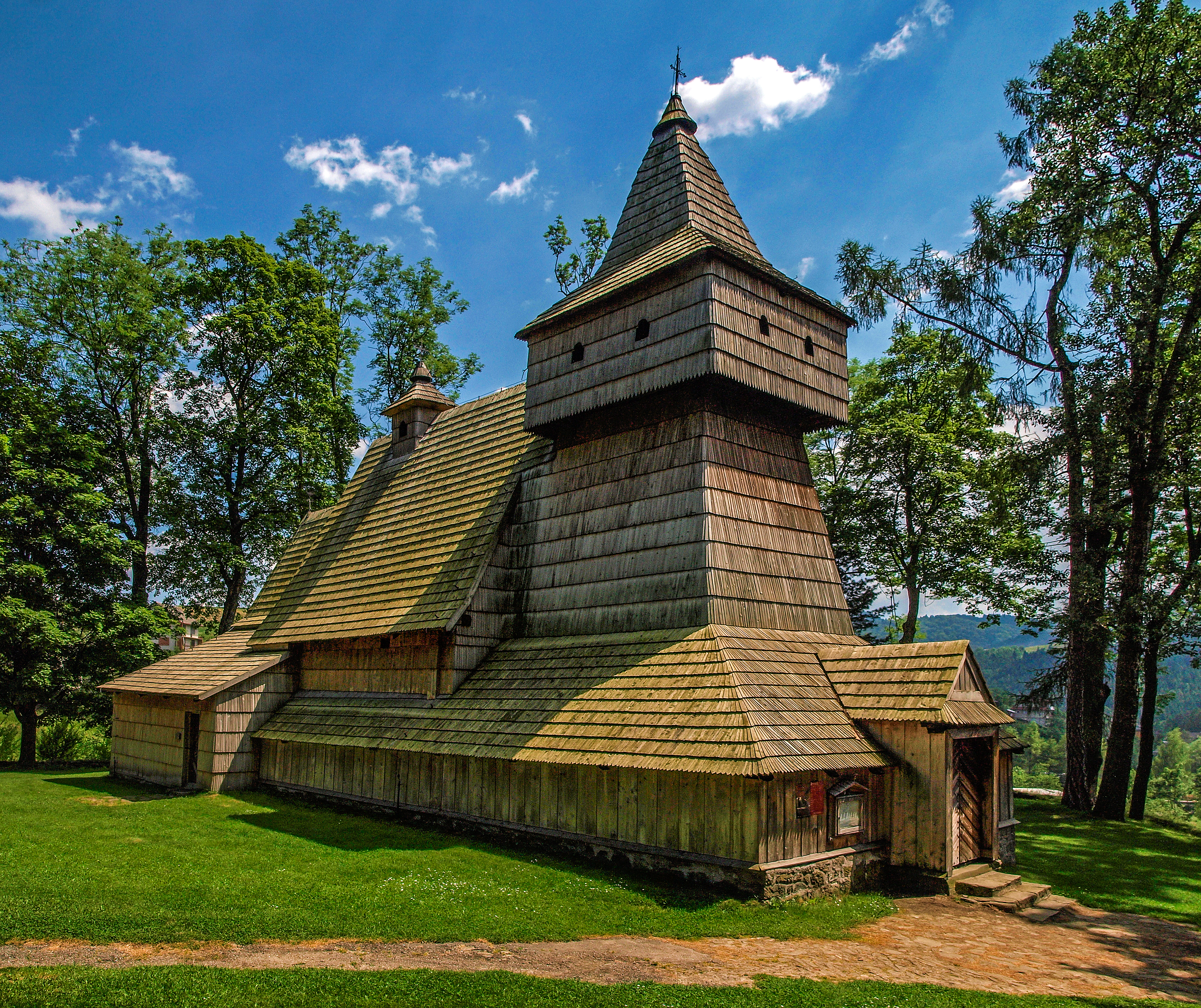
- Church of St. Martin in Grywałd

- Location within Poland
- Coordinates: 49°26′45″N 20°22′14″E
- Country: Poland
- Voivodeship: Lesser Poland
- County: Nowy Targ
- Gmina: Krościenko nad Dunajcem
- Population: 1,670

Grywałd [ˈɡrɨvau̯t] is a village in the administrative district of Gmina Krościenko nad Dunajcem, within Nowy Targ County, Lesser Poland Voivodeship, in southern Poland, close to the border with Slovakia.

The village was first mentioned in a written document in 1330 as Grunevald and in 1335 as Grunvald.
