= Carl Albert Weber =

German botanist

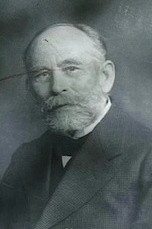
Carl Albert Weber

Carl Albert Weber (13 January 1856, Spandau – 11 September 1931, Bremen) was a German botanist. He specialized in studies of original bog vegetation, the botanical composition of peat and on the developmental history of peatlands.

== Biography ==
He studied under Alexander Braun at the University of Berlin and with Julius von Sachs at Würzburg. After receiving his PhD in 1879, he worked as an assistant under Anton de Bary at the University of Strasbourg. From 1884 to 1894 he was a teacher at the agricultural institute in Hohenwestedt, followed by 30 years of research as a botanist at the Preußische Moor-Versuchsstation (Prussian Moor Research Station) in Bremen. In 1909 he obtained the title of professor. In retirement he remained active in peat bog research.

== Selected works ==
- Ueber specifische Assimilationsenergie, 1879 (dissertation) – On specific assimilation energy.
- Leitfaden für den Unterricht in der Physik an Ackerbauschulen und landwirtschaftlichen Winterschulen, 1898 – Guidelines for the teaching of physics at agricultural schools.
- Über die vegetation und entstehung des hochmoors von Augstumal, 1902 – On the vegetation and formation of the high moors of Augstumal.
- Erläuterung zu den profilen eines nieder- und hochmoores mit ihrer ursprünglichen torfbildenden vegetation, 1908 – On the profiles of low and high moors with its original peat-forming vegetation
- Wiesen und weiden in den Weichselmarschen, 1909 – Pastures in the Vistula marsh.
- Der Aufbau, die Flora und das Alter des Tonlagers von Rabutz, 1920 – The structure, the flora and the age of the Tonlagers of Rabutz.
- "C.A. Weber and the raised bog of Augstumal" (in English, 2002).
