= Krościenko nad Dunajcem =

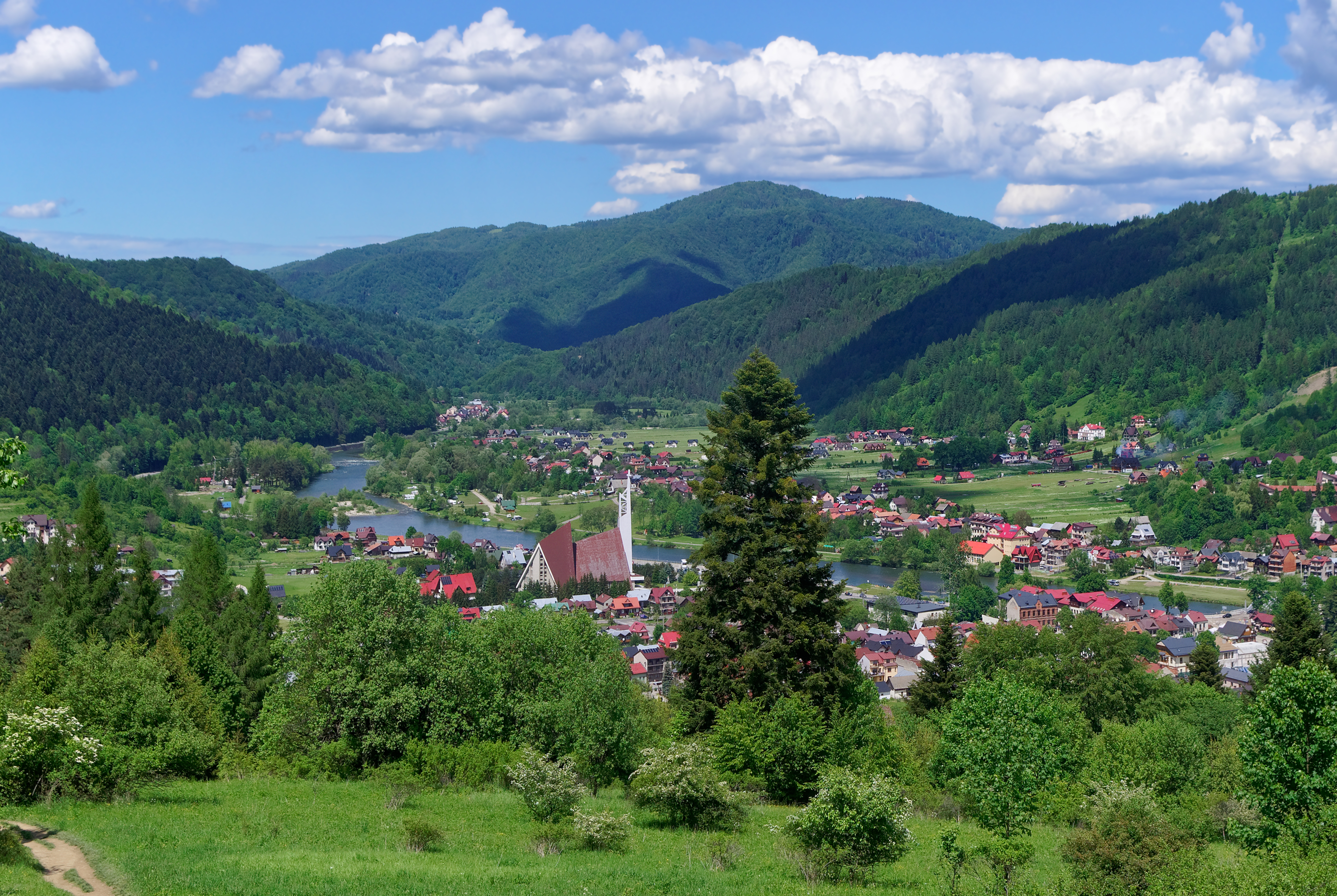
- Panorama of Krościenko nad Dunajcem

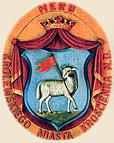
- Coat of arms

- Location within Poland
- Coordinates: 49°26′15″N 20°25′47″E
- Country: Poland
- Voivodeship: Lesser Poland
- County: Nowy Targ
- Gmina: Krościenko nad Dunajcem

Government
  - wójt: Jan Dyda

Area
  - Total: 25 km^{2} (9.7 sq mi)
- Highest elevation: 982 m (3,222 ft)
- Lowest elevation: 405 m (1,329 ft)

Population (2009)
  - Total: 3,552
- Time zone: UTC+1 (CET)
  - Summer (DST): UTC+2 (CEST)
- Postal code: 34–450
- Area code: +48 18
- Car plates: KNT
- Website: www.kroscienko-nad-dunajcem.pl

Krościenko nad Dunajcem [krɔˈɕt͡ɕɛŋkɔ nad duˈnai̯t͡sɛm] is a village in southern Poland situated in the Nowy Targ County in Lesser Poland Voivodeship, near Poland's border with Slovakia. Town rights were given to Krościenko by king Casimir the Great in 1348.

== History ==
Krościenko is one of the oldest settlements in Polish part of the Pieniny Mountains. Its history dates back to the late 12th century, when it was a village serving the now non-existing Pieniny Castle (see also Dunajec river castles). In 1348, Casimir the Great granted Magdeburg rights to Krościenko, and shaped the village into a medieval town, with a market square and street grid. Royal decree, giving the charter to Krościenko does not exist, as it was burned in a Hussite raid in 1433. At that time the town was named Crosna in documents.

Due to convenient location along a merchant route to Hungary, Krościenko prospered. In 1350, a Roman Catholic parish was established here, and in 1565, a parish school was opened. The period known as Polish Golden Age ended in the 17th century, when Krościenko was affected by several wars (see Swedish invasion of Poland, Great Northern War) and rebellions (see Kostka-Napierski Uprising). As a result, by mid-18th century Krościenko was almost deserted.

In 1770, Krościenko was occupied by the Habsburg Empire. The town became property of Austrian treasury, which in 1822 sold it to the Gross family. New owners noticed local mineral waters, and decided to turn Krościenko into a spa, with guest houses and baths. In 1934, Krościenko was officially recognized as a spa. In the Second Polish Republic, it became a very popular tourist resort, located in close proximity to Pieniny National Park. Nevertheless, the number of permanent residents was so low that in 1932 Krościenko lost its town charter.

In 1973, Krościenko was joined with nearby Szczawnica, and the town of Szczawnica–Krościenko was created. In 1982, this idea was abandoned, due to protests of residents.

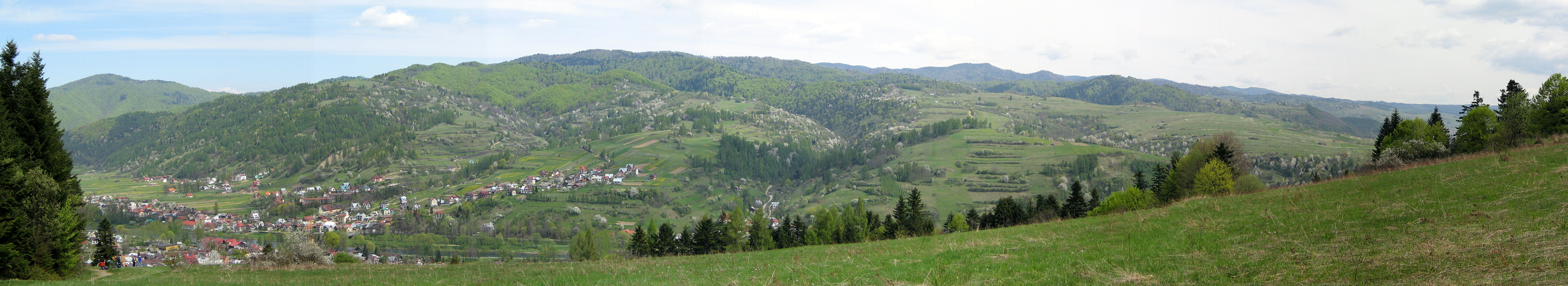
Panoramic image of Krościenko nad Dunajcem

== Tourism ==
Numerous tourist attractions include Pieniny National Park Museum, the 14th-century church rebuilt in Baroque style in 1589, and in summer, walk trails in the Pieniny mountains. There are holiday cottages and paths for mountain biking both advanced and easy. In winter, ski lift at Szczawnica-Palenica is available at 6 km (4 mi) distance.

== Notable residents ==
- Tytus Maksymilian Huber (1872–1950), mechanical engineer
- Kazimierz Szpądrowski (1899–1940), military officer, head of the Katowice intelligence outpost and intelligence chief of the Kraków Army

== See also ==
- Pieniński Park Narodowy
- Dunajec River
- Dunajec River Gorge
- Nowy Targ
- Zakopane
- Krościenko
- Trzy Korony massif
