= Kotuńka =

Prominent rock

Coordinates: 49°25′31″N 20°27′29″E

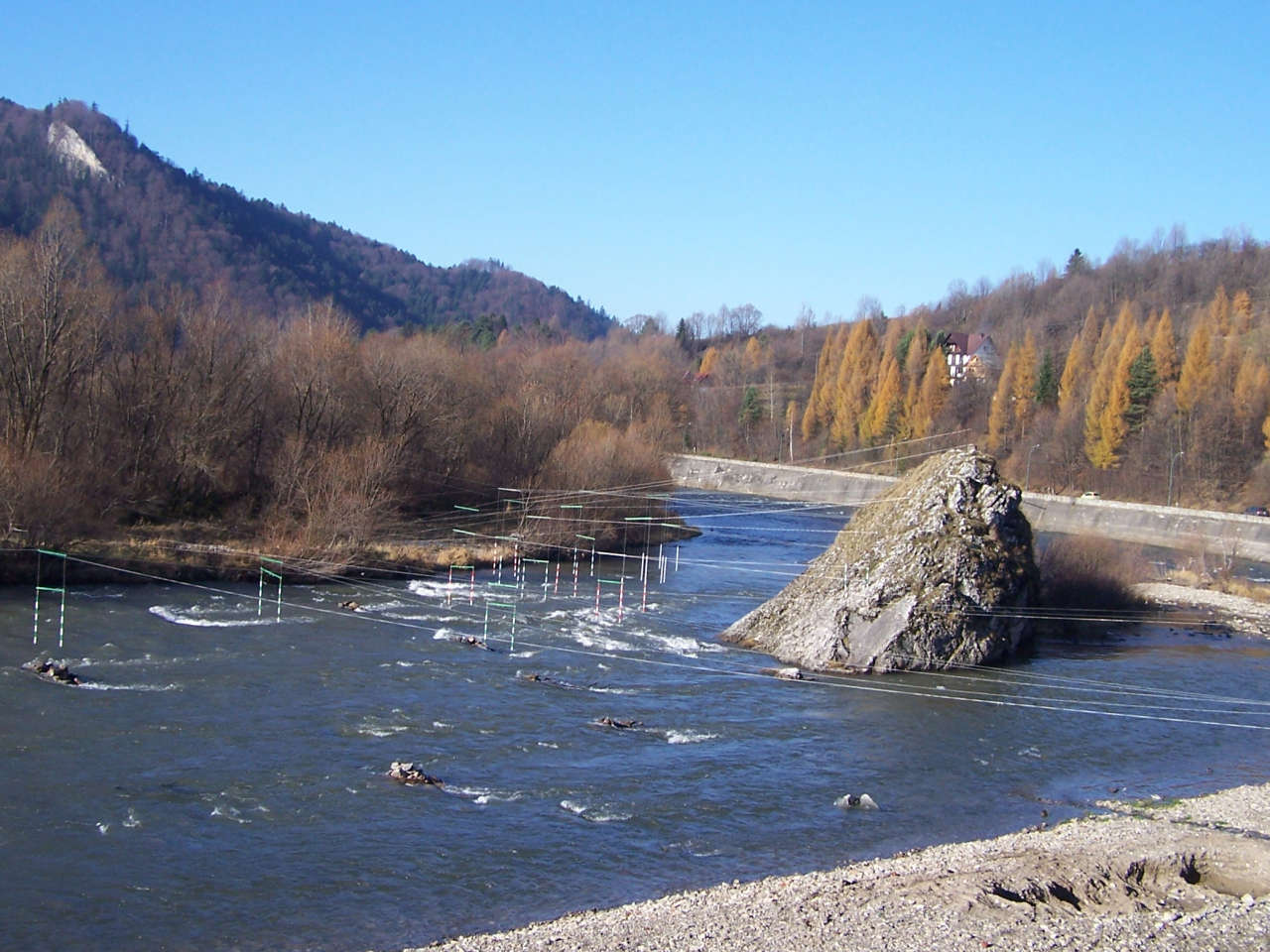

The Kotuńka Rock is a prominent rock found in the centre of the current of the river Dunajec just before the entry into Szczawnica. Built from limestone, the rock is well seen from the road and is a characteristic landmark in the area. Just above the rock the Grajcarek flows into the Dunajec. On from the rock is a bridge, after which begins the Pieniny Trail Road which heads to a border crossing.

Around the Kotuńka rock the Dunajec river rapid is very strong and creates a swirl. This water feature is used by mountain kayakers, which often train in the area, to the left of the Kotuńka rock are embedded gates for such activities. As with many Pieniny rocks, the Kotuńka rock also has a legend. According to the legend, the devil carried a rock which he tried to bring to the Pieniny Castle on the Castle Mountain in the Pieniny, before which in the Tatra Mountains Kinga of Poland was hiding in. However along the way a rooster crowed and the devil's energy went away. The rock fell from the devil's hands and tumbled down into the river without getting anybody hurt. This is the most famous of the legends about the rock.

Kotuńka rock has a height of 9.5 metres, and the tip of the rock is situated at a height of 438 metres. In the years 1875 to 1912 there was a sculpture of a Goral, which welcomed visitors heading to Szczawnica, in the year 1997 a similar statue was placed. Jadwiga Łuszczewska in the year 1869 wrote "we call it Kotuńka rock, because it creeps out of the water, like a sly cat lurking".

== Sources ==
1. Nyka, Józef (2006). Pieniny. Przewodnik. Wyd. IX. Latchorzew: Wyd. Trawers. ISBN 83-915859-4-8.
2. Pieniński Park Narodowy. Pieniny polskie i słowackie. Mapa 1:20 000. Kraków: Wyd. Kartograficzne Polkart Anna Siwicka. ISBN 83-87873-07-1.
