= Grajcarek =

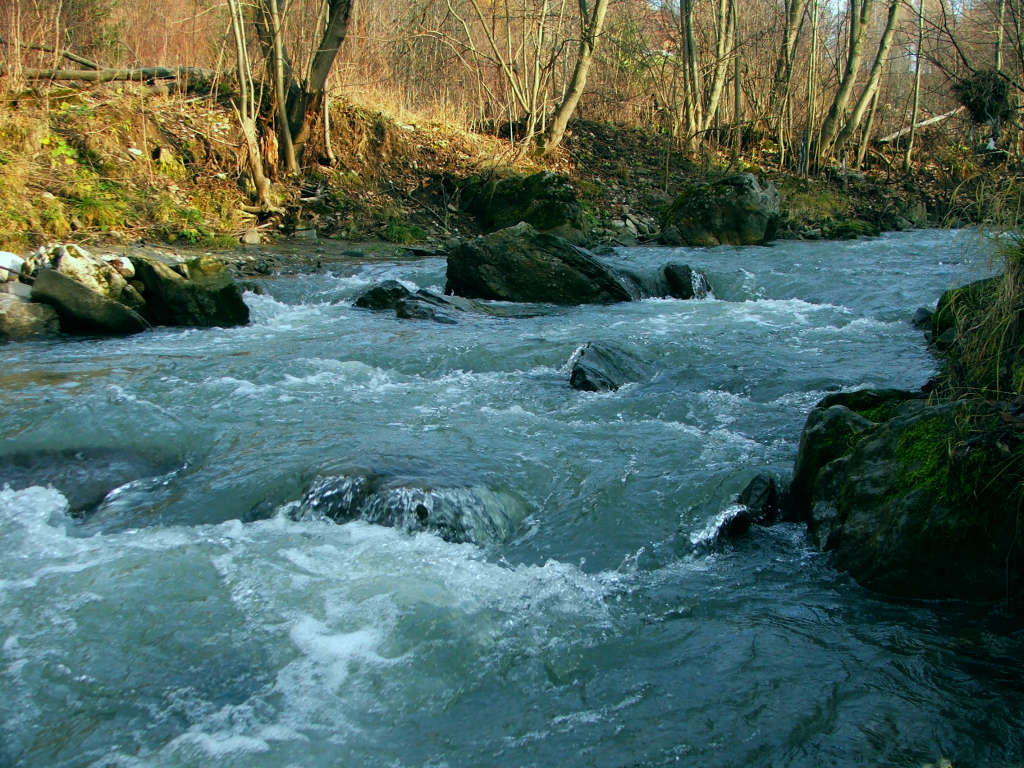
- Grajcarek in Jaworki

Location
- Country: Poland

Physical characteristics
- Source
  - location: Beskid Sądecki
- Mouth
  - location: Dunajec
  - coordinates: 49.4242°N 20.4593°E
- Length: 15 km (9.3 mi)
- Basin size: 85.5 km^{2} (33.0 sq mi)

Basin features
- Progression: Dunajec→ Vistula→ Baltic Sea

Grajcarek is a minor river, a stream, running between foothills of the Lesser Pieniny and Beskid Sądecki. It starts at Jaworki, as the confluence of the Biała Woda and Czarna Woda streams. The river flows through Jaworki, Szlachtowa, and flows into the Dunajec in Szczawnica, just before the characteristic Kotuńka Rock, at an elevation of 430 metres. After the crossroads of the roads is a bridge, under which flows the river Grajcarek, after which the Pieniny Trail Road begins.

The sources of Grajcarek are considered to be at the source of Biała Woda, which is found at a height of approximately 950 metres. The basin area of the river is 85,5 km², the length from the source to the mouth of the river is about 15 km, with an average fall of 3.5%. The river flows in the general direction of East to the West of the valley, which is also the border between the Pieniny and Beskid Sądecki.

Formerly Grajcarek was called Ruski Potok which can be translated as Ruthenian Stream (before Operation Vistula when the villages which were located around the river Szlachtowa, Jaworki, Biała Woda and Czarna Woda were inhabited by Lemkos, see Ruś Szlachtowska). The name of the river Grajcarek was given by tourists and bathers at the end of the 19th century.
