= Jan Hamerski =

Polish politician (born 1951)

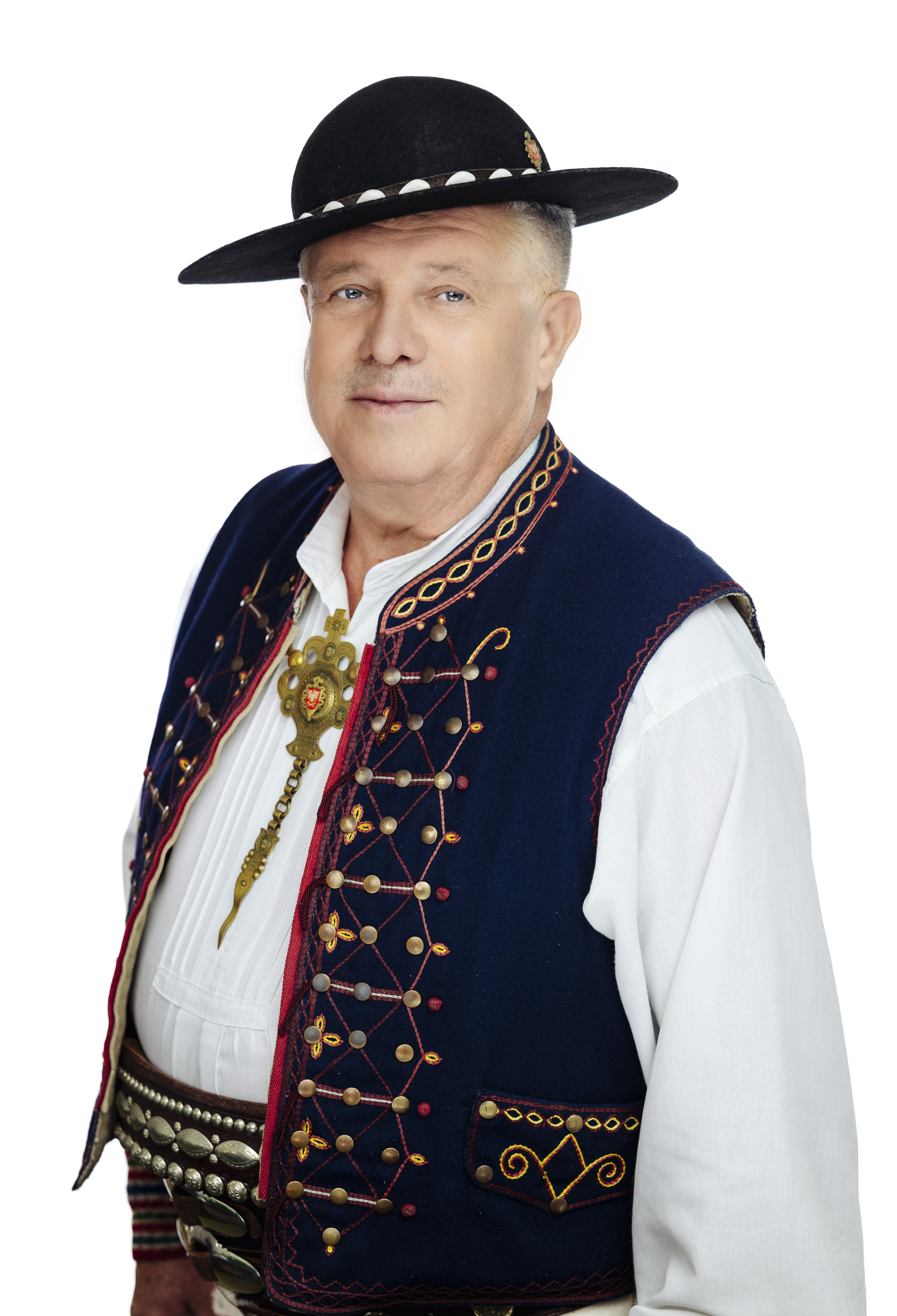
- Hamerski in 2023

Senator

Personal details
- Born: 15 September 1951 (age 75) Szczawnica, Poland
- Party: Law and Justice

Jan Wincenty Hamerski (born 15 September 1951) is a Polish politician. He was elected to the Senate of Poland (10th term) representing the constituency of Nowy Sącz. He was also elected to the 9th term (2015–2019) of the Senate of Poland.

Hamerski was born on 15 September 1951 in Szczawnica. In 1974, he graduated from the Faculty of Philosophy and History at the Jagiellonian University in Kraków. He worked as a primary school teacher in Szlachtowa from 1975 to 1976, and then at a complex of vocational schools in Krościenko nad Dunajcem until 1980. He worked for two years at the Szczawnica town hall, and then a decade at the state-owned Spa Szczawnica.

He is honorary president of the Związku Podhalan, which he had joined in 1975.

In the 2023 Polish parliamentary election, he received a mandate for Senate Constituency no. 36, consisting of counties Limanowa, Nowy Targ, and Tatra, as part of the Law and Justice party (PiS). He received 54.14% of the total vote in the constituency. In each county, he received 61.67% of the votes cast in Limanowa, 51.56% in Nowy Targ, and 47.03% in Tatra. He ran against Krzysztof Chmura of Confederation Liberty and Independence, who received 17.64% of the total vote, and Bogusław Waksmundzki of Voters' Election Committee Candidate of the Mountain Lands (Polish: Komitet Wyborczy Wyborców Kandydat Ziem Górskich), who received 28.22% of the total vote. He later received the support of both candidates.

In 2023, Gazeta Wyborcza reported that he would frequently appear with member of the Sejm Anna Paluch and Lesser Poland Voivodeship marshal Witold Kozłowski during events in Podhale. In April 2025, he opened a joint parliamentary office in Nowy Targ with Andrzej Gut-Mostowy, member of the Sejm for Constituency no. 14 (Nowy Sącz) and fellow member of PiS.

As of 2023, Hamerski is a member of the Senate's Infrastructure Committee, as well as the Culture and Media Committee.
