= Pieniny Castle =

Castle ruins, Pieniny mountains, Poland

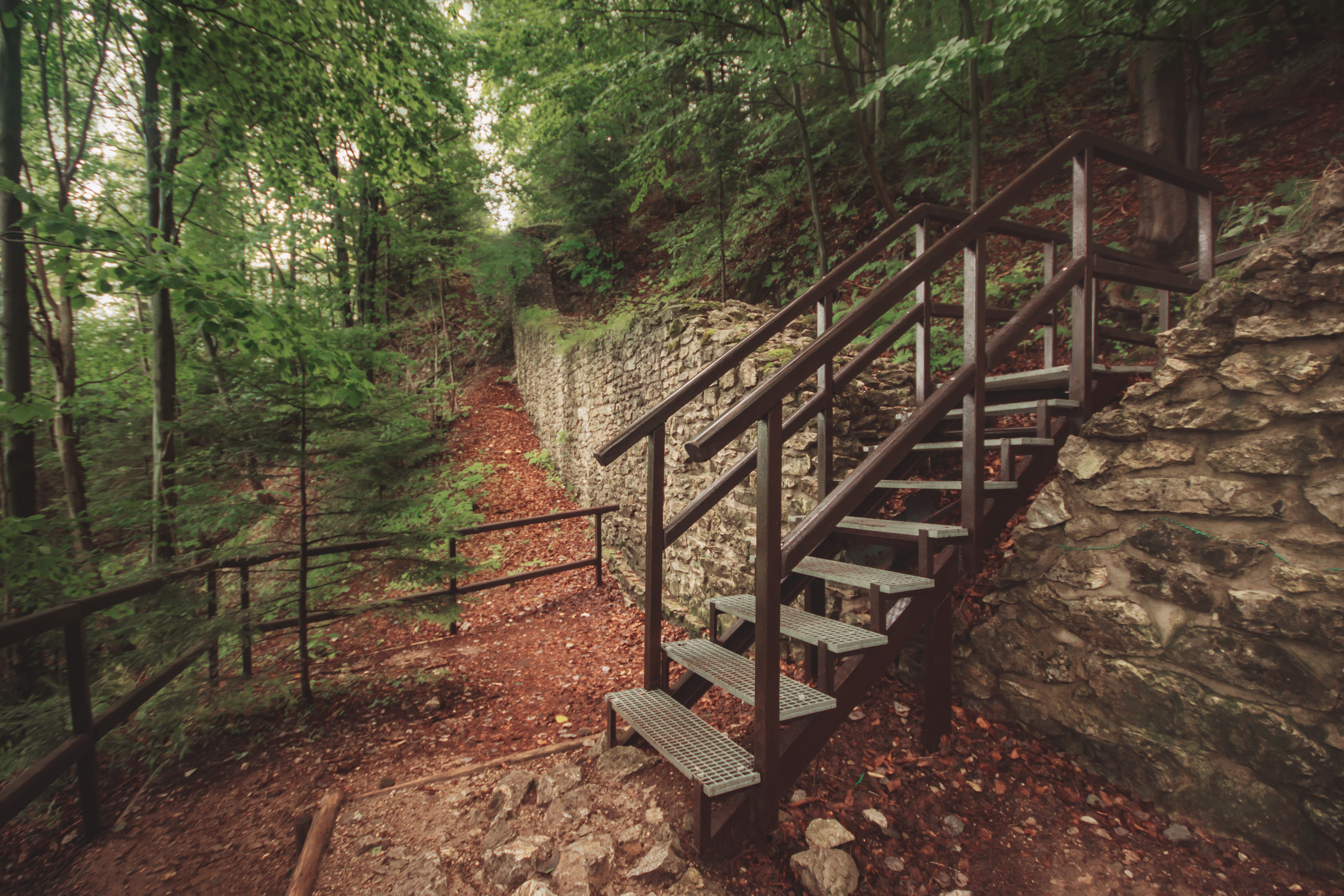
- Fragment of the walls in 2015
- Alternative names: Castle of St. Kinga

General information
- Type: Castle
- Location: Krościenko nad Dunajcem, Lesser Poland Voivodeship
- Coordinates: 49°25′13″N 20°25′14″E
- Completed: Early 1280s
- Destroyed: Likely 1410 or 1433
- Owner: Pieniny National Park

Technical details
- Material: limestone

Pieniny Castle (Polish: Zamek Pieniny), also known as the Castle of St. Kinga, is a ruined medieval Polish castle located near Krościenko nad Dunajcem, Lesser Poland Voivodeship, in the Pieniny mountains.

The stronghold was most likely built in the early 1280s. Its construction is associated with Saint Kinga, Duchess of Kraków, who is believed to have commissioned it as a refuge for the Poor Clares' monastery of Stary Sącz in times of conflict. The duchess and the nuns took shelter there during the third Mongol invasion of Poland (1287–1288).

The castle's subsequent 14th-century history is poorly documented. While recent research suggests that it remained in use in the 15th century, the prevailing view among researchers holds that it was likely abandoned in the 14th century and destroyed during the invasion of the Hussites or the forces of Stibor of Stiboricz at the beginning of the 15th century.

The building is one of the oldest masonry castles in Poland and is an example of hillside castle architecture. It could accommodate a hundred people and several dozen soldiers. Designed to blend into the natural landscape, the castle was fortified by impassable rocks and located at a high altitude, making it difficult for the enemy to spot. In the 20th and 21st centuries, the site was the subject of numerous archaeological excavations, which made it possible to reconstruct its layout. Furthermore, the ruins have become one of the tourist attractions of the Pieniny National Park, located along the blue hiking trail leading to the Trzy Korony peak.

== Location ==
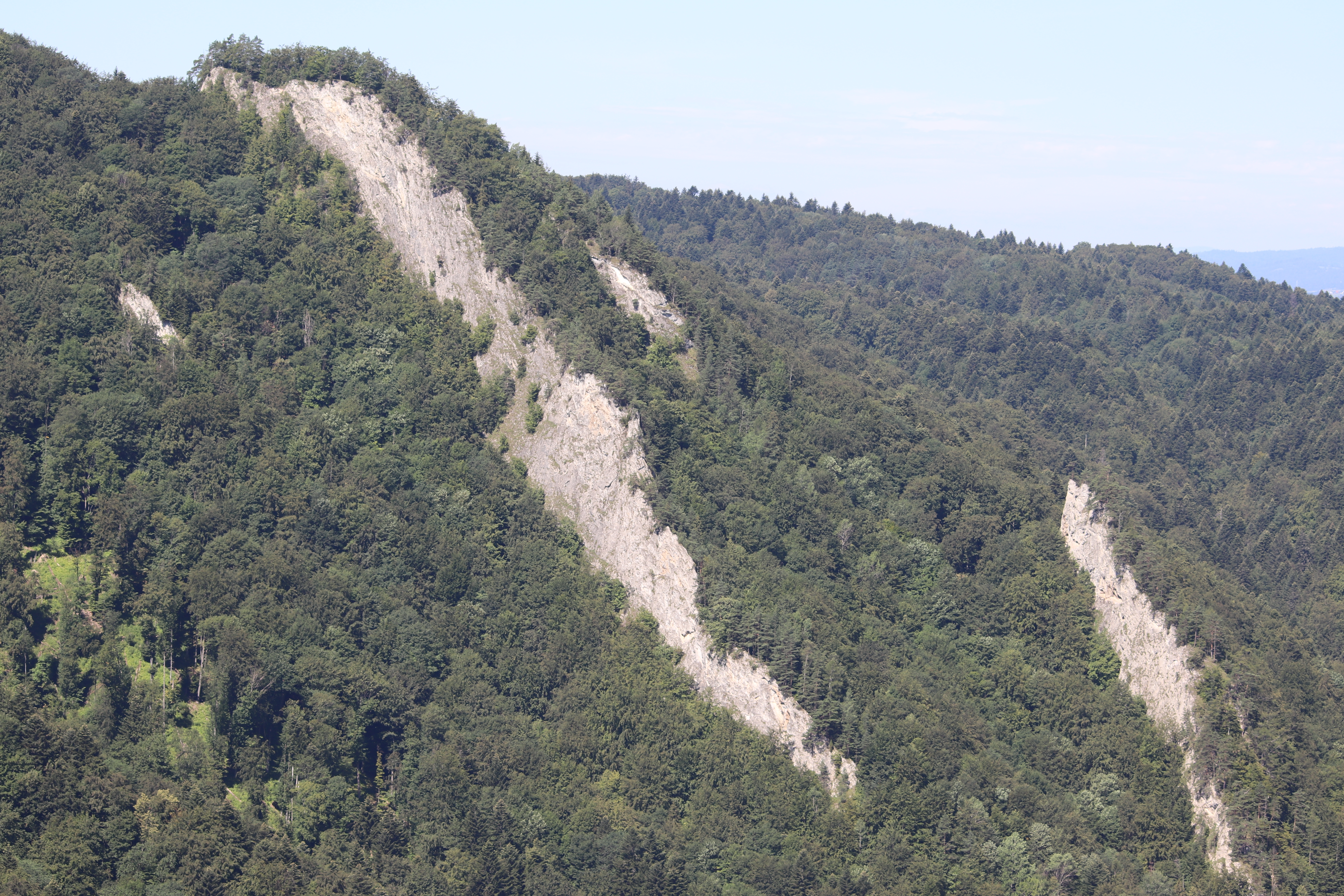
Zamkowa Góra, viewed from Sokolica

Pieniny Castle is located on the northern slope of Zamkowa Góra which rises to a height of 792.7 m above sea level, (Note: Various publications give the elevation as 799 or 779 m above sea level.) which descends towards the nearby Huliński Stream. The summit is part of the Trzy Korony Massif, bordered by the Pieniny Stream valley to the south and northeast, and connected to Ostry Wierch and the main massif (including the Trzy Korony peak) by the Zamkowa Pass to the south.

The castle's position made it invisible from the valleys or the surrounding hills (except the hard-to-reach northern peaks of Pieninki). It also created favorable conditions for defense, with rocky cliffs restricting access to the castle from the east, south, and west, posing an obstacle to invaders. In scientific publications, the castle is described as a structure with an unusual spatial layout, which was "masterfully integrated into the natural landscape". The stronghold had two entrances – the main western one led to Krościenko nad Dunajcem through the Szopka Pass, while the eastern one descended through the Pieniny Stream valley to the Dunajec River Gorge.

An important aspect – probably decisive for the curtain wall's placement – was a spring, which most likely existed on the location of castle cistern and supplied the garrison with water. Naturally concealed under leaves and soil, it was discovered during research conducted at the ruins in the 1970s. Legends later appeared, attributing healing properties to the spring's water.

The total area of the complex was approximately 0.4–0.6 ha, located between 740 and 760 meters above sea level. Assuming that the summit of Zamkowa Góra was also fortified, the structure is the highest masonry castle in the Polish part of the Carpathian Mountains. Just below the stronghold is the Cave of St. Kinga, a place of pilgrimage and worship of Kinga of Poland.

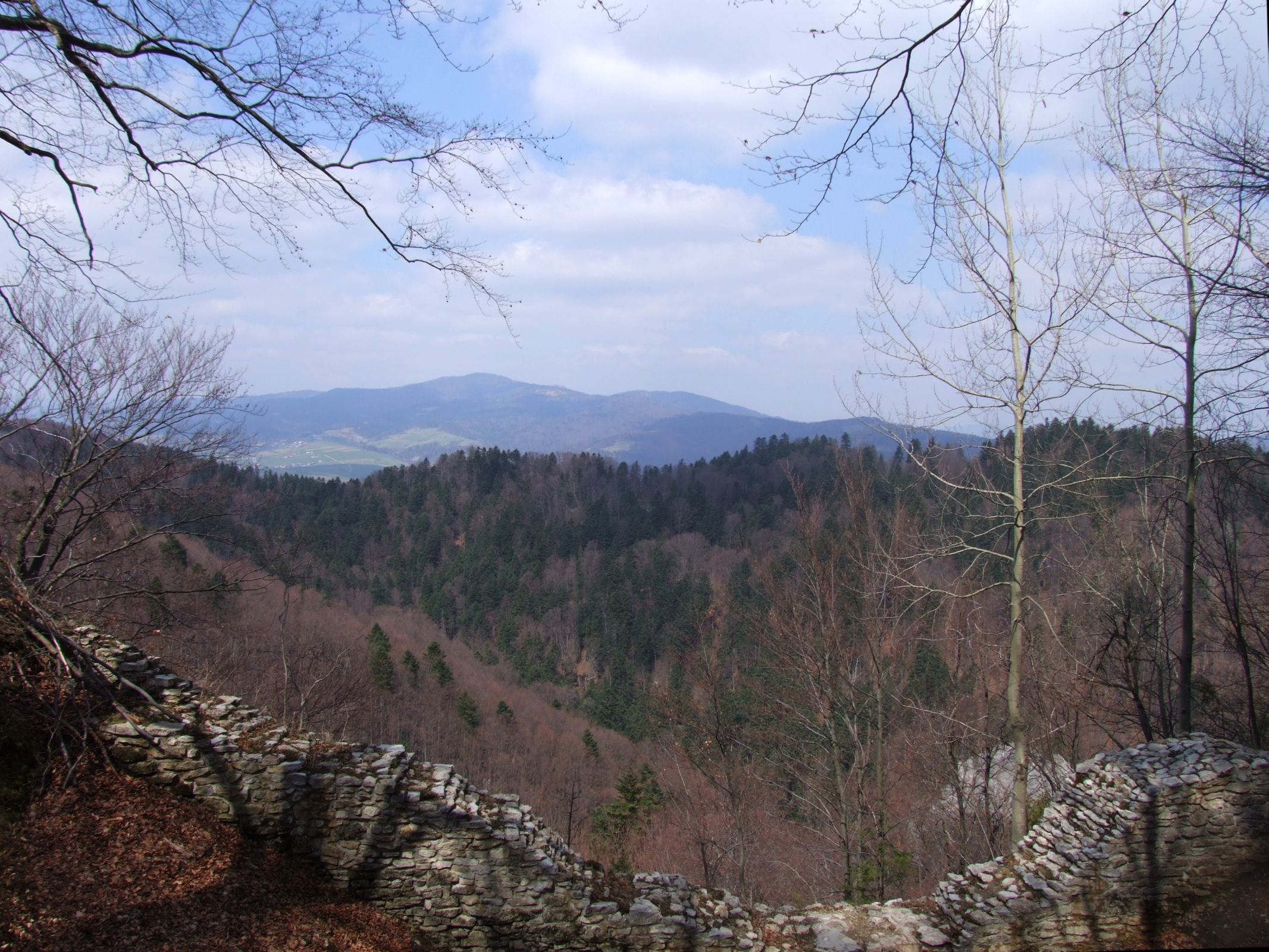
View from the castle ruins towards Pieninki and the Lubań Range

The castle ruins are located within the Pieniny National Park and are surrounded by rich vegetation, including carnations, alpine aster, golden alyssum, and Zawadzki's chrysanthemum. There is also a site of edelweiss, which, according to Józef Nyka, may be a remnant of the 19th-century transplantation efforts of the Polish Tatra Society. The slopes of Zamkowa Góra, once covered with pine forest (which burned down in a two-week fire in 1915), are now dominated by sycamore woodland. The castle grounds themselves are covered with mixed conifer forest, mainly beech and fir.

The ruins are located on the blue trail of the Polish Tourist and Sightseeing Society, which leads to Trzy Korony. Stone steps, built during the excavation of the cave at the beginning of the 20th century from material obtained from the walls, lead from the trail to the ruins. The stronghold is almost 7 km from the Orlica mountain hut and less than 3 km from the Trzy Korony mountain hut.

== History ==
Historians and archaeologists date Pieniny Castle to the second half of the 13th century, despite the account of Jan Długosz (15th-century Polish chronicler and historian), which suggests that Duke Bolesław V the Chaste visited it during the first Mongol invasion of Poland in 1241 – most likely referring to another stronghold in the Pieniny Mountains. Thanks to research conducted in the 1970s, it was possible to approximate the date of construction of the stronghold to the early 1280s, although Daniel Gazda suggests that it could have taken place earlier or later – most likely before 1287. The event is associated with Duchess Kinga of Kraków, who had a large fortune at the beginning of her reign (40,000 grzywnas, equivalent to about 8.5 tons of silver), most of which was used to rebuild Lesser Poland devastated by the Mongol invasions. The castle likely served as a refuge for the monastery of Stary Sącz during threats, and could accommodate a hundred people and several dozen soldiers. It was an example of a so-called refugium – used in the event of an invasion.

The building was modern for its time – in the 13th century, most strongholds were still built using wood and earth, rarely stone, and even the Wawel Castle had only wooden, earth, and stone curtain walls. Pieniny Castle is one of the first in Poland and most likely the first in Lesser Poland to be built using stone and mortar. This may suggest that the builders came from the south – where such constructions were erected earlier than in Poland – perhaps from Hungary, St. Kinga's homeland. The builders may have drawn inspiration from the 13th-century Wawel palas or the 12th-century Spiš Castle.

The castle's existence is linked to the establishment of Sromowce and Krościenko settlements. According to Karol Potkański, there must have been a larger settlement nearby, which would have provided economic support for the garrison and visitors, while Bronisław Krzan identifies it with Krościenko. The medieval settlement of "Crosno", as M. Książek writes in his work Zarys rozwoju przestrzennego Krościenka nad Dunajcem w okresie średniowiecza (An Outline of the Spatial Development of Krościenko nad Dunajcem in the Medieval Period), was originally located near the so-called Gródek, at present-day Pienińska Street, on the road leading to the Pieniny stronghold.

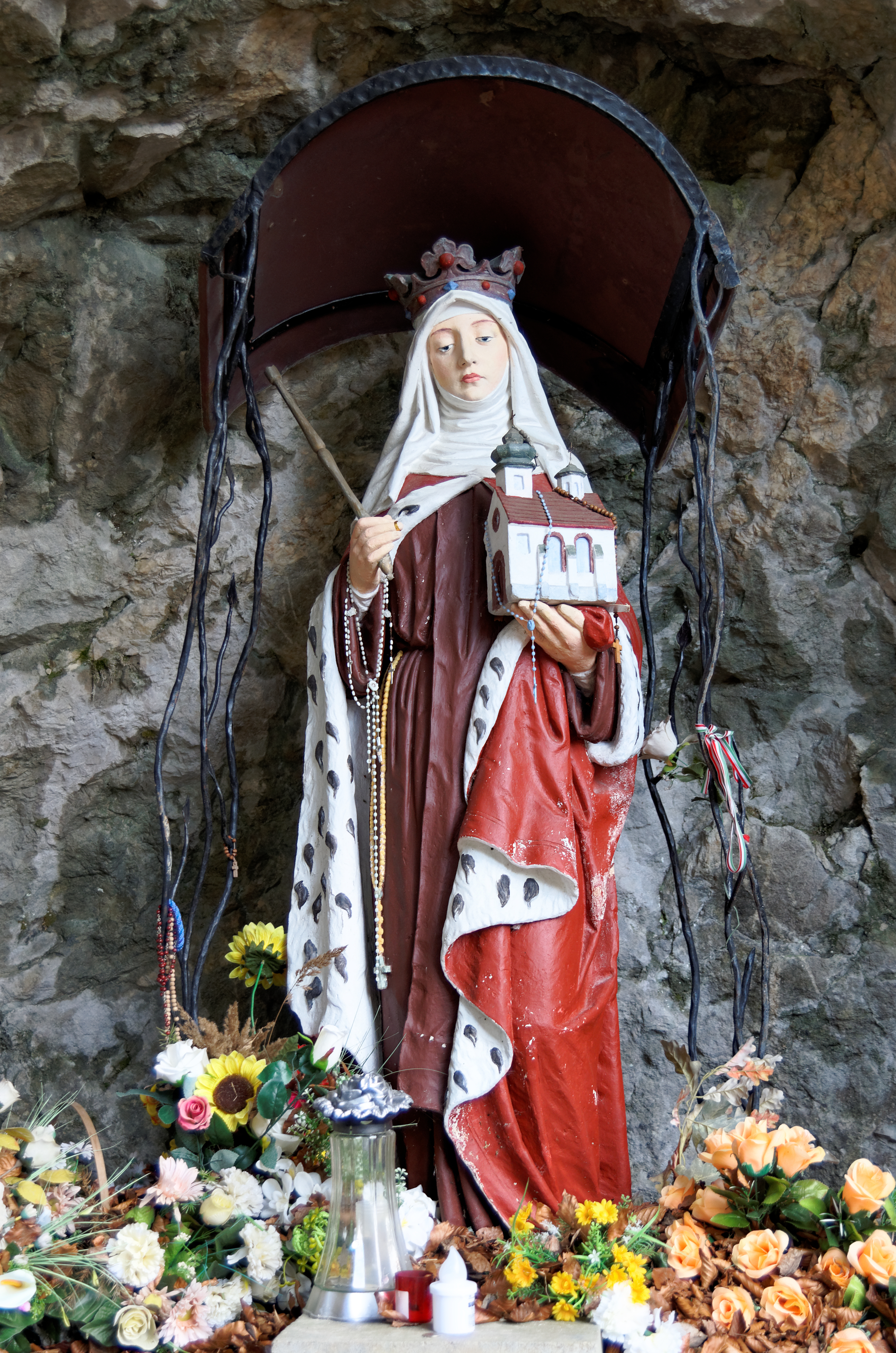
Statuette of St. Kinga in the cave below the castle

The first reliable mention of the building dates back to the 14th century. The source suggests that after the third Mongol invasion of Poland, led by Nogai Khan, Kinga took refuge there with her court, priests, knights, and 70 Poor Clares (including her sisters, princesses Yolanda and Constance) at the beginning of December 1287. The Tatars did not attempt to capture the stronghold at that time – they tried to set the castle on fire with a barrage of missiles, but withdrew in the face of reinforcements approaching from Hungary.

After the invasion, the stronghold ceased to appear in sources. The prevailing view in historiography is that in the 14th century it likely fell into disrepair and was reduced to the role of a local watchtower, which was of little use due to its distance from the main trade routes and the existence of the larger Czorsztyn Castle, which was undergoing expansion at the time. By the 15th century, Pieniny Castle was supposedly no longer in use at all. According to Andrzej Skorupa's theory, it was destroyed in 1410 by the army of Stibor of Stiboricz (sent by Sigismund of Luxembourg to help the Teutonic Order, then at war with Poland), which ravaged the Sądecczyzna region. A 19th-century source, on the other hand, says that the building was destroyed in 1431 or 1433 by Hussite forces. However, these dates are not certain – the castle may still have been used as a base by the Hussites or the Hungarian troops of Matthias Corvinus in 1474. However, artifacts found on the site indicate that it was still in use as late as the 15th century. As late as the 17th century, Poor Clares were said to have taken refuge there from the plague.

During its relatively short history, the castle was not rebuilt in any way – research has shown that the walls are quite uniform and were built in the same period.

=== Ruins ===
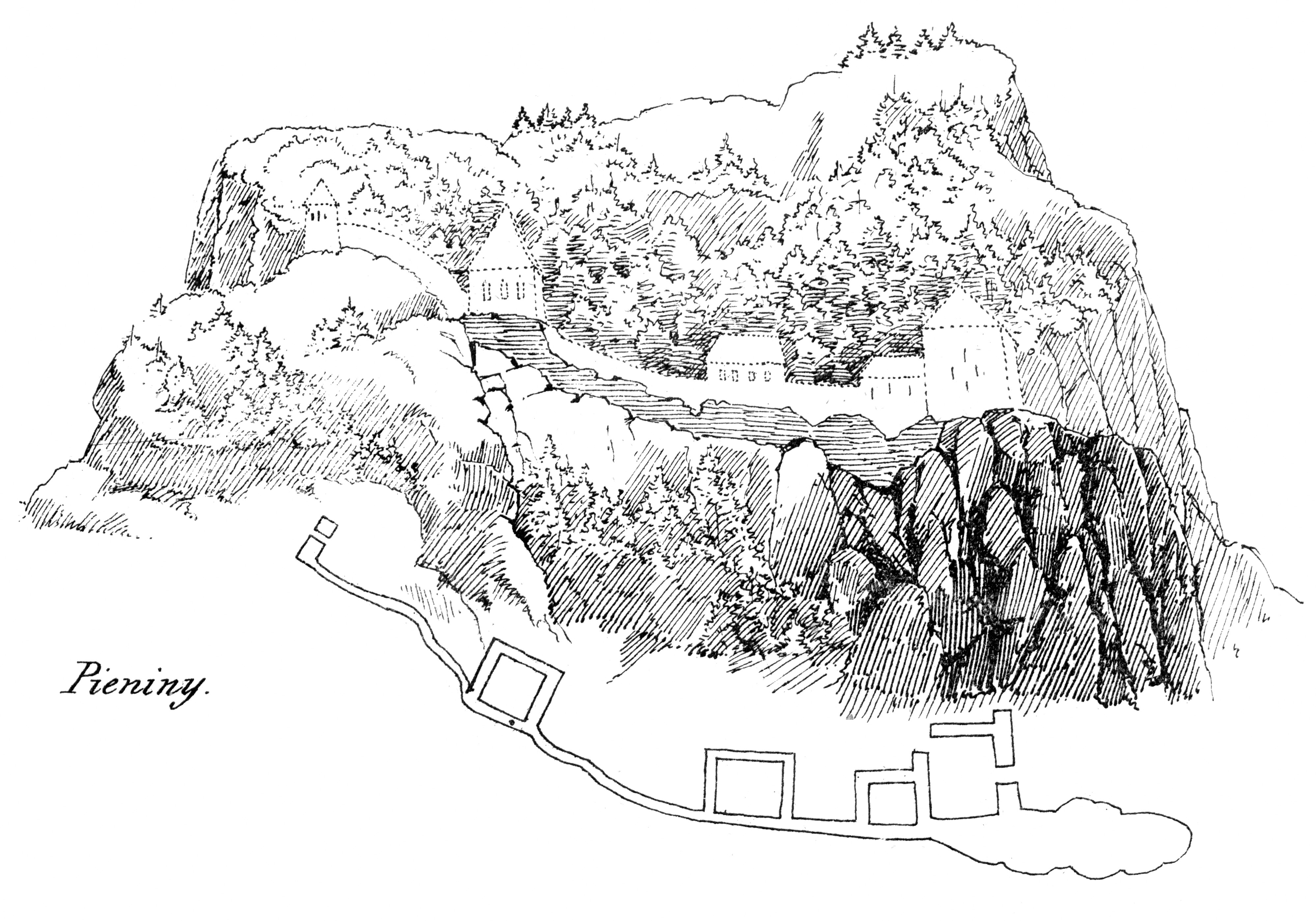
Castle depicted by Feliks Jan Szczęsny Morawski

In the 17th and 18th centuries, the stronghold was mentioned in geographical studies as an example of an exceptionally well-defended castle, including in Laurence Echard's publication from 1782. In the 19th century, the ruins were a place of pilgrimage, including for patients from Szczawnica, and were also often visited by seekers of legendary treasures, which were said to be hidden somewhere in the stronghold, leading to amateur excavations. At that time, the ruins were sometimes mistakenly identified as the remains of Saint Kinga's monastery. The first scientific description of the castle appears in Feliks Jan Szczęsny Morawski's publication entitled Sądecczyzna, published in 1863. In 1894, the Polish Tatra Society marked out an official path to the castle, which was marked out in 1906. In 1904, a hermitage was built there, and a statue by Władysław Druciak was placed in the Cave of St. Kinga below the castle. In 1925, the ridge of Zamkowa Góra was secured with iron railing.

In the late 1920s, further publications mentioning the castle appeared: Helena Langerówna's System obronny doliny Dunajca w XIV w. (The Defensive System of the Dunajec Valley in the 14th Century) and Tadeusz Szydłowski's Pomniki architektury epoki piastowskiej we województwie Krakowskiem i Kieleckiem (Monuments of Piast-Era Architecture in the Kraków and Kielce Voivodeships). These works essentially repeated the theses put forward by Szczęsny Morawski in Sądecczyzna. It was not until Szydłowski's next work, Inwentarz topograficzny powiatu nowotarskiego (Topographical Inventory of Nowy Targ County), that Morawski's proposed plan of the building was questioned. Between 1938 and 1939, Tomasz Szczygielski from the Pieniny Museum conducted the first archaeological research in the ruins, which resulted in, among other things, the discovery of bones of an aurochs and the remains of a cistern. Arrowheads, metal vessels, a spearhead, nails, and a belt buckle were also excavated. However, the work was interrupted by the outbreak of war, and Szczygielski died in Auschwitz. The artifacts and a significant part of the documentation were lost. Individual finds are preserved in the collection of the Józef Szalay Pieniny Museum in Szlachtowa.

Szczygielski was the author of several theories, which were later rejected by contemporary scientists. He believed that the construction of a stronghold such as Pieniny Castle must have been too costly for the weak Piast dukes and could have been initiated by Bolesław I the Brave. The discovery of pottery dating from the turn of the 10th and 11th centuries was supposed to confirm this theory. Another hypothesis put forward by Szczygielski was that the structure was built by Roman legionaries as a "watchtower" near the Amber Road, given that a coin from the time of Constantius II was found in the ruins. According to him, the building could also have been a shelter for robber barons who preyed on merchants.

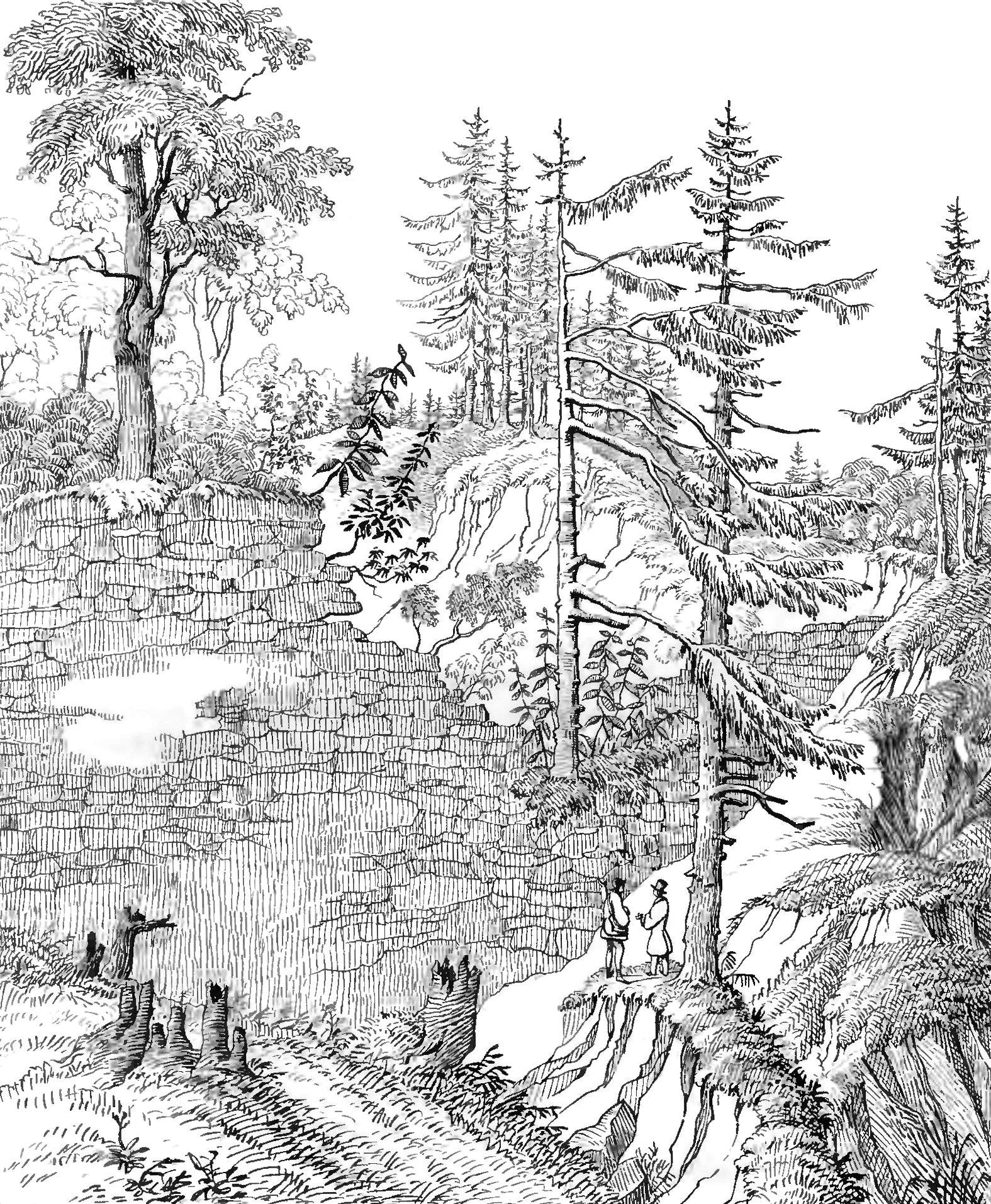
Ruins illustrated by Maciej Bogusz Stęczyński

In 1951, the ruins were included in the Catalogue of Art Monuments in Poland. Excavations resumed after 1953 and were conducted by the Carpathian Archaeological Expedition under the direction of Andrzej Żaki. These studies were conducted on a smaller scale and were exploratory in nature. Their results were partially included in the publication Archeologia Małopolski wczesnośredniowiecznej (Archaeology of Early Medieval Lesser Poland), although they were never fully published. Further work, carried out by the Institute of Archaeology of the Jagiellonian University, took place between 1976 and 1978 under the direction of Maria Cabalska (1976–1977) and Stanisław Kołodziejski (1977–1978). The line of the walls was reconstructed, traces of a cistern that supplied the defenders with water were revealed, and the remains of walls in the southern part of Zamkowa Góra were discovered. At the same time, more arrowheads and spearheads, fragments of clay pots, nails, and a ceremonial bronze mace were excavated.

In 2003, following efforts by the administration of the Pieniny National Park, the ruins were entered in the Registry of Cultural Property (Reg. No. A-7/M, dated April 18, 2003). The site was cleared of vegetation, water drains were profiled according to Piotr Stępień's concept, and a wooden platform was built above the basement's ceiling to relieve the load. In 2004, the stairs and paths leading to the ruins were renovated. Between 2006 and 2007, the Pieniny National Park attempted to save the relics. The work, carried out according to P. Stępień's design, was supervised by S. Kołodziejski. The walls were secured and the gaps in the stone were filled in, the cistern was completely uncovered (including the floor at the bottom), a 2-meter-deep well was excavated, and the area was drained. In 2009, after the trails had been marked out, the remains of the castle were opened to tourists.

In 2017, the ceiling of the basement of the gatehouse collapsed, and the stronghold was once again closed to visitors. In 2018, Daniel Gazda from the Ureusz Foundation in Warsaw began research on the castle. Further archaeological work took place between 2020 and 2021, led by D. Gazda and carried out by the Pieniny Archaeological Mission, which operates under the auspices of the foundation. At the same time, renovation work was carried out, during which the walls and ceiling of the building were reconstructed and covered with a new platform, with the necessary materials transported by helicopter.

== Architecture ==
A modern plan of the castle ruins

The castle complex has an unusual form, with few regional parallels. It is an example of the use of high-mountain terrain for defensive purposes. In Poland, a comparable example is the Sokolec Castle in Lower Silesia. The walls were built of locally sourced limestone joined together with lime mortar. The brickwork resembles the Romanesque style, similar to the so-called appareil allongé. There are no leveling courses, (Note: However, Ludomir Książek writes in his record card that compensatory layers of finer dimension stones are visible in the brickwork.) as in the walls of 14th-century buildings, which confirms that the structure dates back to an earlier period, i.e., the 13th century.

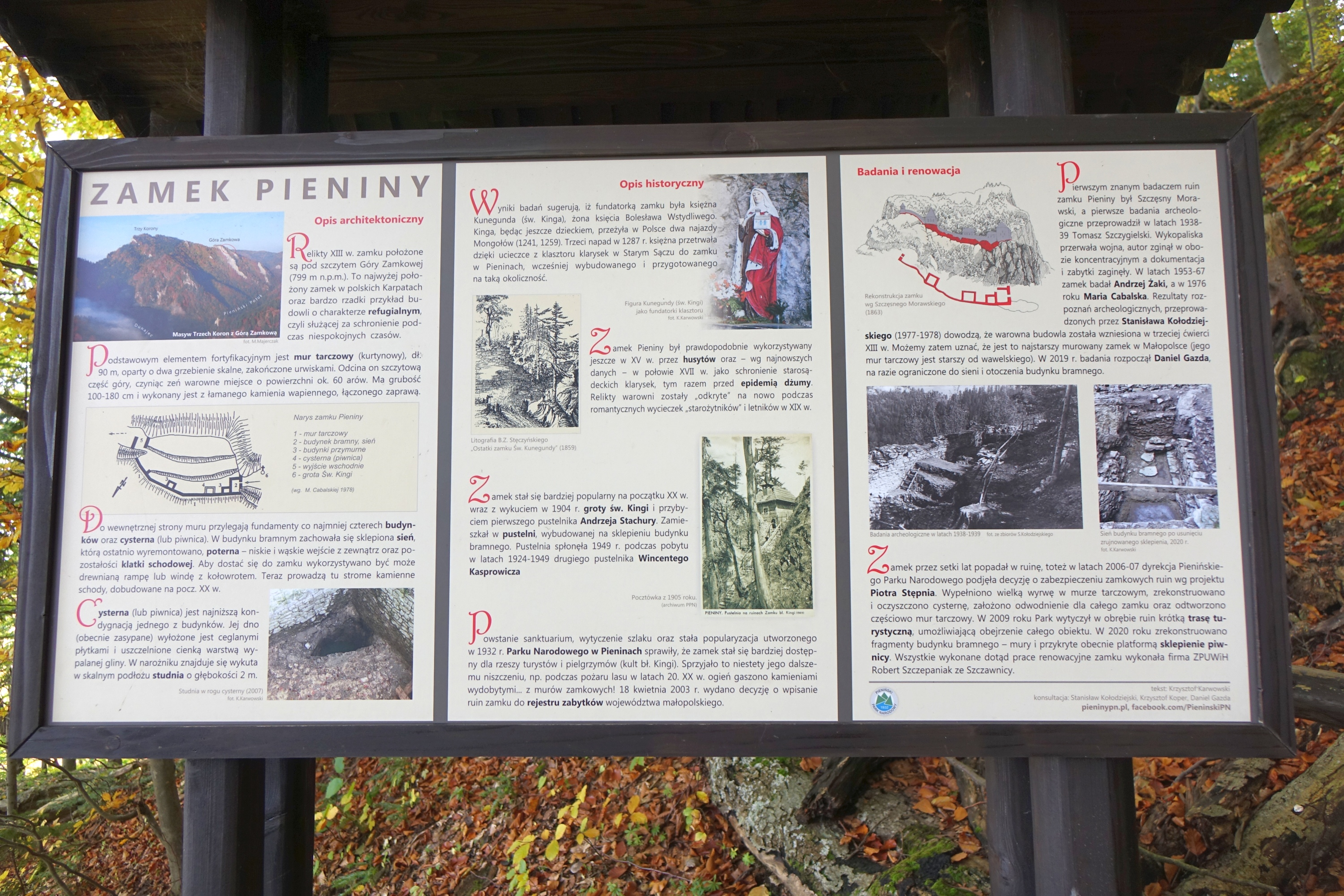
Information board

The main curtain wall, about 80 m (260 ft) long, curved gently between two rock outcrops. Its original thickness along its entire length (except for a few short sections) was approximately 160 cm (63 in) in the part just above the berm; currently, due to damage and the effects of time, it is approximately 100–120 cm (39–47 in). It has been preserved almost along its entire length, though vegetation covers the eastern section. It is possible that it may have been heightened with timber. The transverse walls sealed the eastern (the so-called Jaworowa Valley) and western parts of the complex. The western wall has been preserved to a height of approximately 5.5 m (18 ft) and is clearly visible. At basement level, it is over 2.5 m (8 ft 2 in) wide, and at the top, approximately 1.8 m (5 ft 11 in). The two eastern walls, which were approximately 5–6 m (16–20 ft) apart, are now poorly visible under vegetation. They had an offset arrangement, each of them adjoining only one of the rocks between which it was erected – the inner one was connected to the southern slope and was 2–2.5 m away from the northern rock, while the outer wall adjoined the northern rock ridge and was located at a similar distance from the southern slope. This arrangement may suggest the existence of a gate in this place, consistent with medieval principle of architectura militaris – a "right-hand-turn" entrance favored defenders, as it was more difficult for the enemies to cover themselves with shields carried on their left shoulder.

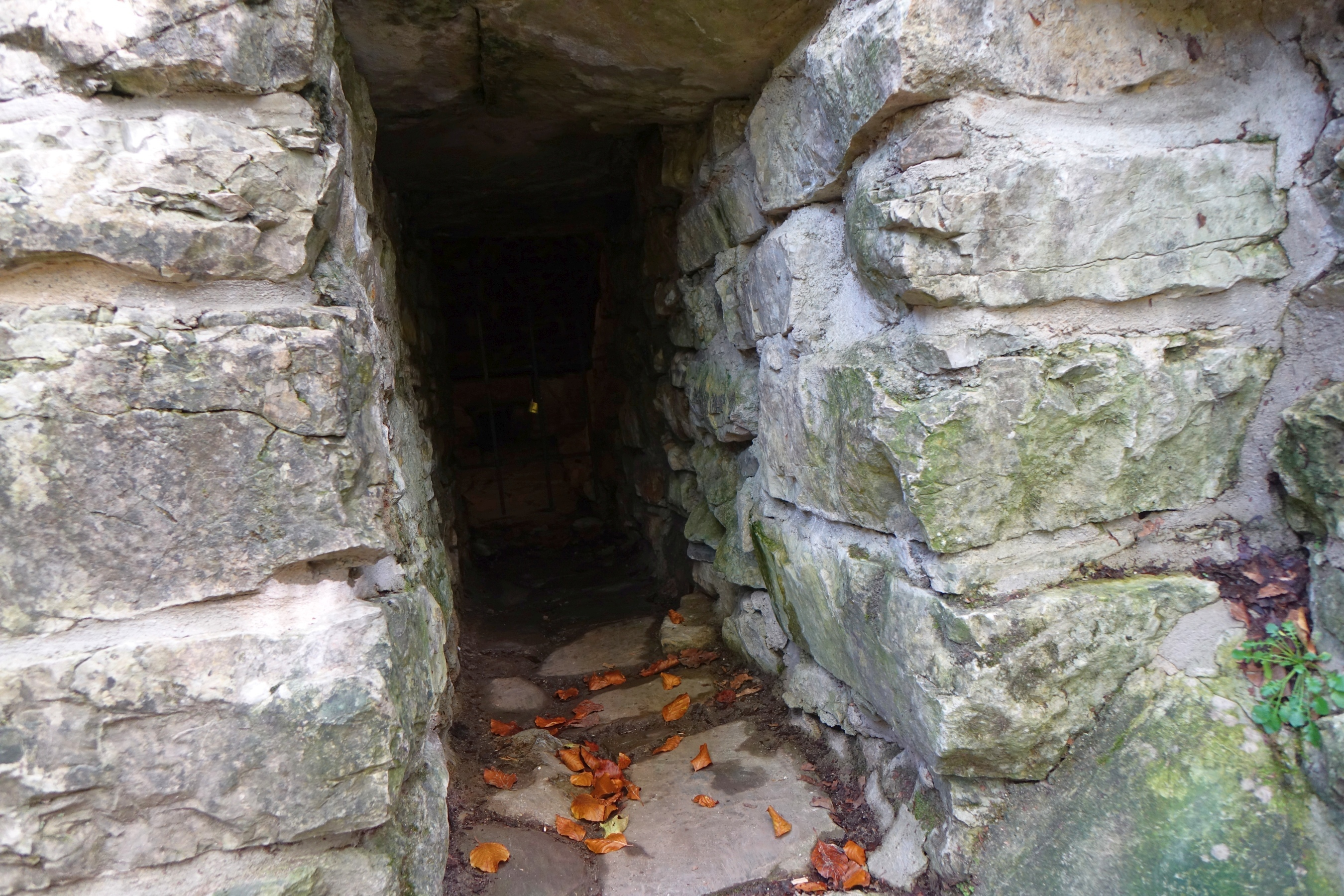
Opening interpreted as a postern

Several buildings adjoined the main wall. Their walls are much thinner than the curtain wall, being approximately 100 cm (39 in) thick. A square structure measuring 11 × 11 m, built on rock foundations, with a barrel vaulted cellar made of rough stone and a stone floor, adjoined the main curtain wall and the western wall. It may have served as a gatehouse with battlements and a hoarding, though it could also have been a square tower accessed by a basket on a windlass. In the wall, just above the supporting rock, there is a preserved opening leading to the basement with a stone lintel, whose authenticity is confirmed by 19th-century illustrations. It is not decorated with a frame, but stands out in the wall pattern and measures 93 × 46 cm, resembling a postern. (Note: Gazda (2022, p. 232) writes in his work that, in view of the artificial transformations of the area in the 20th century, the original location of the opening in relation to the ground is unknown, which makes it difficult to clearly determine its function. S. Kołodziejski claimed that communication through the opening would be extremely difficult due to its size.) This seems to suggest that the building served as a bergfried. The second entrance to the basement, reached by primitive stone steps, led from the east. On top of the remains of the building, there were two hermitages built in the 20th century: in 1904 (burned down in 1915) and in 1924 (burned down in 1949).

Next to the western building was a second, smaller one, measuring approximately 5 × 6 m. The remains of this structure are now obscured by an earth embankment, which has prevented researchers from examining them thoroughly. Józef Nyka suggests that these may be the remains of the foundations of a fortified tower or a chamber.

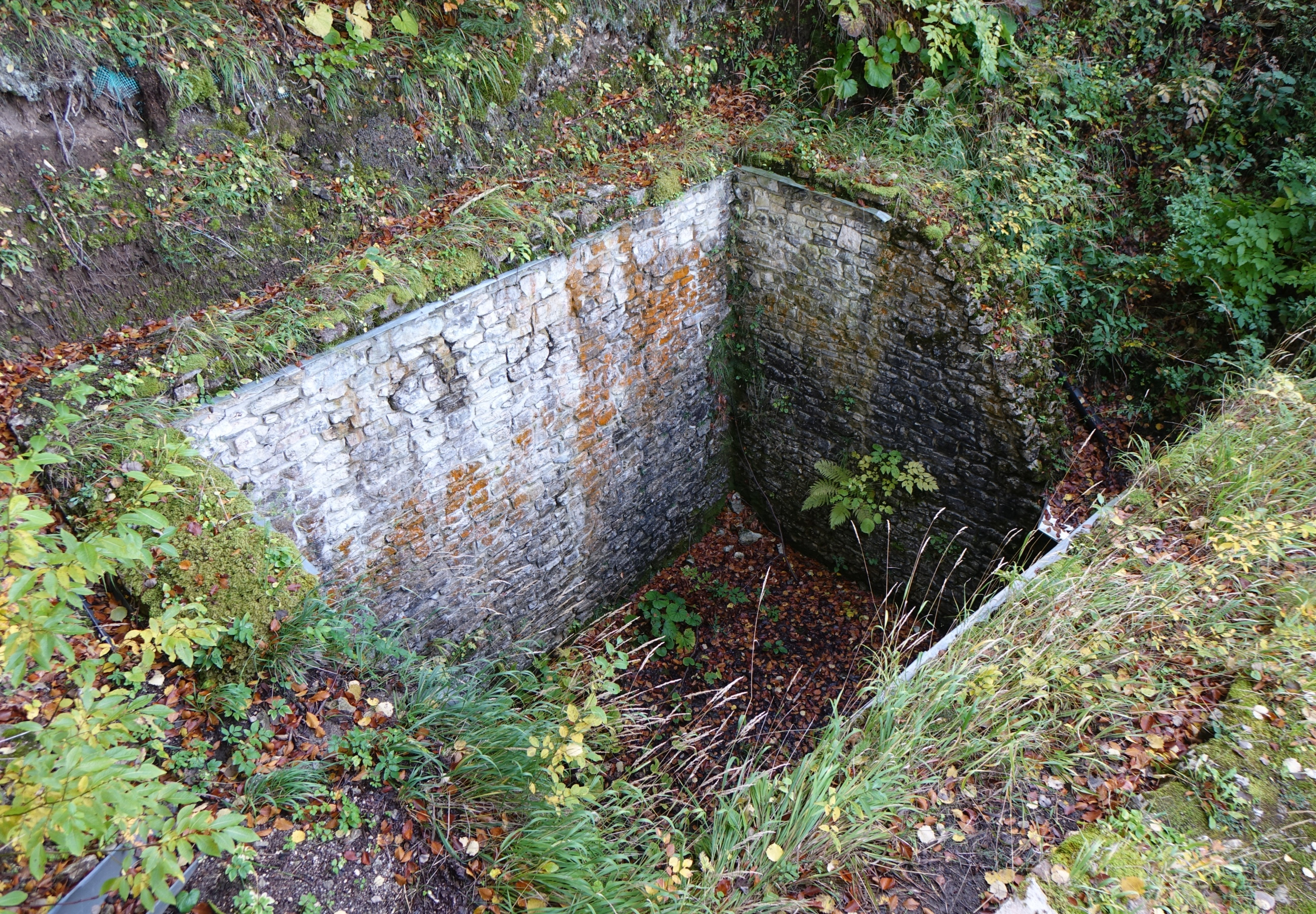
Cistern

The walls of another building, with internal dimensions of 4 × 6 m, have been preserved without facing. A timbered depression is interpreted as a cistern. This is indicated by the fact that water from the periodically drying St. Kinga's spring collects in a 2-meter well discovered in the corner of the building. The bottom of the cistern is lined with red flooring, resembling irregularly arranged brick halves. The brickwork in this area is the most precise, which researchers explain by the need to ensure the building's watertightness; additionally, the bottom was covered with a thin layer of water-impermeable burnt clay. The thickness of the curtain wall in this area at the base is approximately 260 cm (100 in). There is also a clear berm approximately one meter wide.

Two additional buildings adjoined the curtain wall. The remains of the first are now barely visible, but archaeological research has determined that the room had internal dimensions of approximately 2 × 4 m. The second building is indicated by two surviving transverse walls, each up to 2.5 m long and are approximately 2 m apart.

In addition to masonry buildings, wooden structures were also erected near the wall, but no remains of them have survived. Similar elements may have been built on the slope – although it seems too steep to be a place for buildings, archaeologists have discovered traces of natural or artificial cut recesses that could have supported them, perhaps connected by wooden footbridges. The masonry structures alone could not accommodate a permanent garrison and temporary refugees (such as the duchess' court and nuns). In addition, space for utility rooms was also necessary.

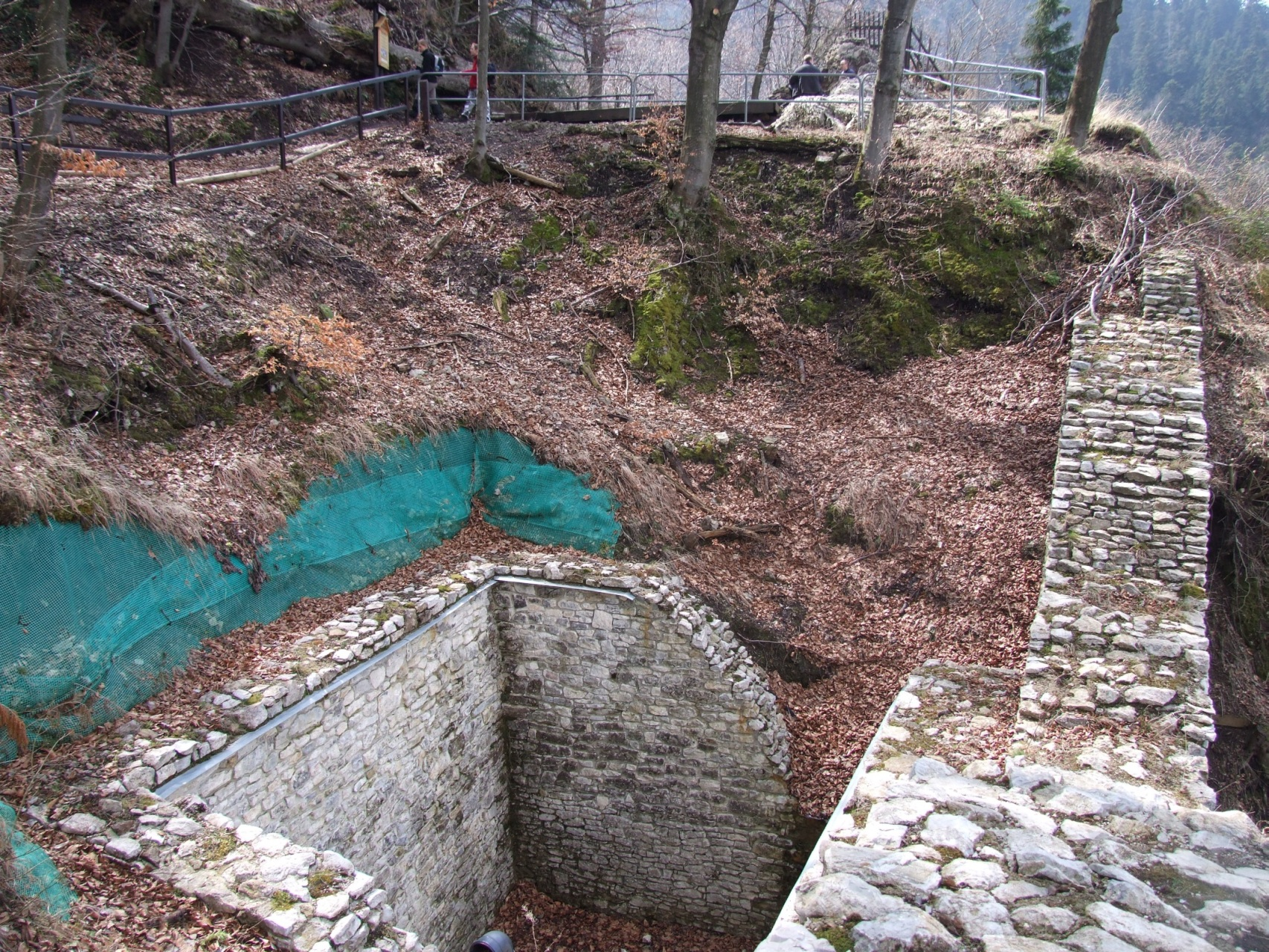
Section of the walls

The remains of short walls have been preserved on the inner side of the main curtain wall. Parapet walls most likely protected the rocky mountain edges – traces of walls of this type were found during research in the 1970s on the southern ridge. According to one theory, the wall may have been located at the very top of Zamkowa Góra and protected the castle from attack from Ostry Wierch. As of 2006, these traces had not been verified.

Researchers' attention has been drawn to a gap in the wall, approximately 86 cm wide and edged with dimension stones, at the site of the current footbridge leading outside the walls. Various hypotheses have been put forward as to its function – it could have been a drainage culvert (as water accumulates in this place) or a secret entrance. The opening's poor preservation (missing middle and upper sections) prevents any theory from being unequivocally confirmed.

No pre-19th-century illustrations of the castle survive, making wall heights hard to estimate. It is known that the building was rather low and lacked high towers, as their existence would have made it difficult to hide the stronghold from attackers. Stępień and Karczmarczyk suggest that the height of the castle buildings probably did not exceed the height of the curtain wall – the exception may have been the western building, which may have resembled a stocky tower in shape.

== Legend ==
There is a legend associated with the castle. During the Tatar invasion, when the Poor Clares took refuge in the stronghold, the siege was commanded by a man named Abu Bej. He had learned of the castle's existence from one of the prisoners. He hoped that by capturing the castle, he would gain possession of the treasures managed by the nuns. The castle's garrison was small – it seemed that there was no chance of defending it. After praying all night, the nuns managed to repel the Tatars' morning attack with great difficulty, but at the cost of heavy losses in human lives. Finally, the last knight was killed by an arrow, and the nuns were left alone. Then, thanks to the fervent prayers of the Poor Clares, a miracle was said to have happened. Clouds covered the sky, and a thick fog descended, preventing the Tatars from seeing the castle. Lost in the fog, they slid into the abyss.

== In culture ==
The castle became the subject of a poem by Konstanty Maniewski entitled Przy gruzach zamku św. Kunegundy w Pieninach (Among the Ruins of St. Kunigunde's Castle in the Pieniny).

== See also ==
- Dunajec river castles

== Bibliography ==
- Stępień, Piotr; Karczmarczyk, Stanisław (2006). "Badania konserwatorskie Zamku Pieniny i koncepcja jego zabezpieczenia" [Conservation Research on Pieniny Castle and the Concept for Its Preservation] (PDF). Pieniny – Przyroda i Człowiek (in Polish). 9. Pieniny National Park. ISSN 1230-4751. Archived from the original (PDF) on 30 January 2024.
- Gazda, Daniel (2022). "Badania Pienińskiej Misji Archeologicznej na zamku Pieniny (św. Kingi) w latach 2020–2021" [Research by the Pieniny Archaeological Mission at Pieniny Castle (Castle of St. Kinga) in 2020–2021]. In Bodziarczyk, Jan (ed.). Pieniny: Przyroda i Człowiek [Pieniny: Nature and Man] (PDF) (in Polish). Vol. XVIII. Kraków: Publishing House of the University of Agriculture in Kraków. ISBN 978-83-66602-64-9.
