= Gmina Szczawnica =

Gmina Szczawnica Szczawnica Commune
- Gmina
- Flag Coat of arms
- Interactive map of Gmina Szczawnica
- Coordinates (Szczawnica): 49°25′N 20°29′E
- Country: Poland
- Voivodeship: Lesser Poland
- County: Nowy Targ
- Seat: Szczawnica

Area
  - Total: 87.9 km^{2} (33.9 sq mi)

Population
  - Total: 7,380
  - Density: 84.0/km^{2} (217/sq mi)
- Website: http://www.szczawnica.pl/

Gmina Szczawnica is an urban-rural gmina (administrative district) in Nowy Targ County, Lesser Poland Voivodeship, in southern Poland, near the border with Slovakia. Its seat is the town of Szczawnica. The gmina covers an area of 87.9 square kilometres (33.9 sq mi) and has a population of 7380.

Until 1 January 2008, Szczawnica was an urban gmina (a town having gmina status). The urban-rural gmina (Gmina Szczawnica) was created when certain settlements which had been within the town's boundaries were designated as villages in their own right. These are Jaworki (including the former villages of Biała Woda and Czarna Woda) and Szlachtowa.

== Neighbouring gminas ==
Gmina Szczawnica is bordered by Gmina Krościenko nad Dunajcem, Gmina Łącko, Gmina Piwniczna-Zdrój, Gmina Rytro and Gmina Stary Sącz.
