= Jaworki, Lesser Poland Voivodeship =

Jaworki
- Village
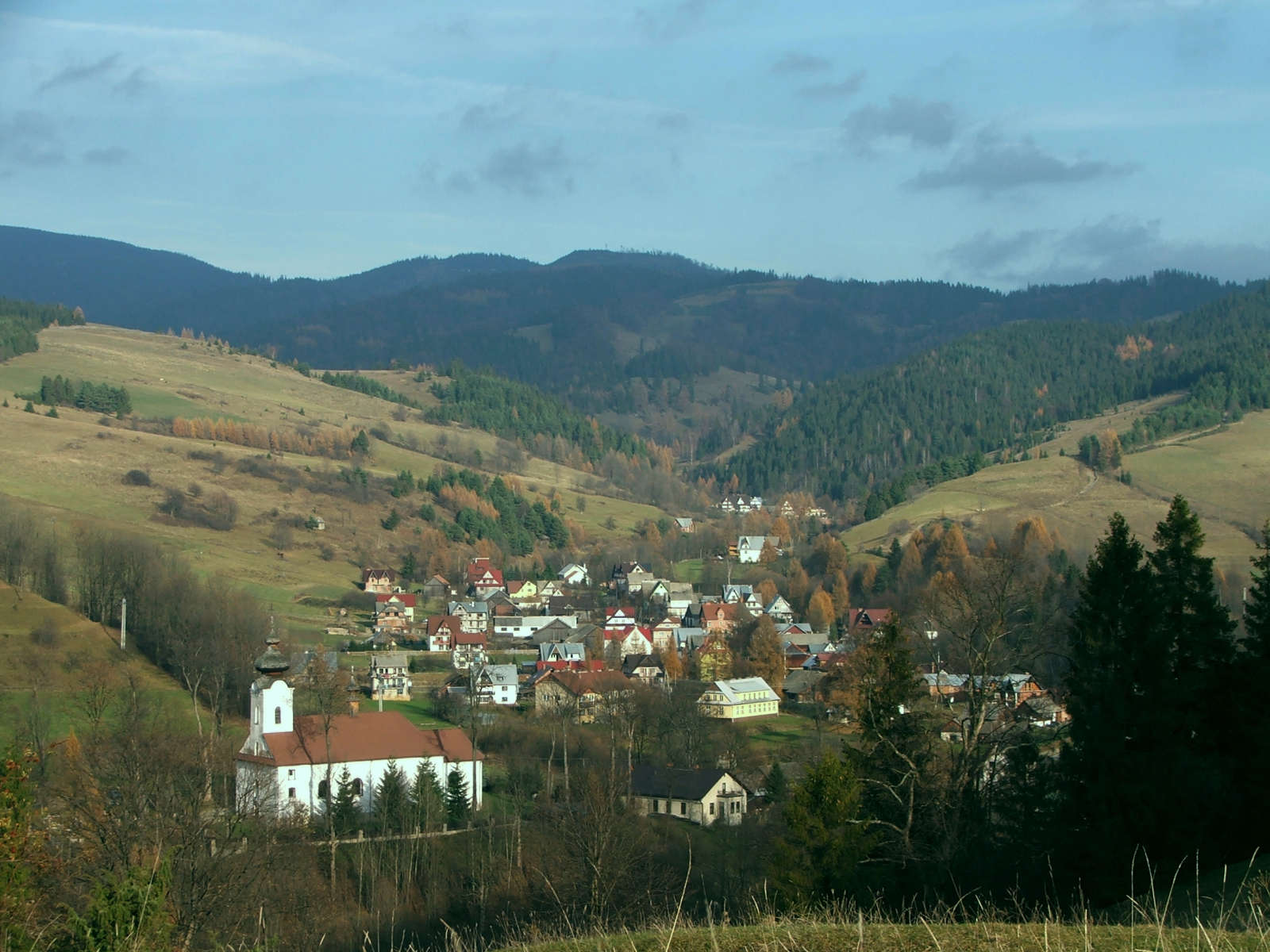

- Location within Poland
- Coordinates: 49°24′37″N 20°33′7″E
- Country: Poland
- Voivodeship: Lesser Poland
- County: Nowy Targ
- Gmina: Szczawnica

Jaworki [jaˈvɔrkʲi] (Note: Lemko Rusyn: Явіркы, romanized: Javirky) is a village in the administrative district of Gmina Szczawnica, within Nowy Targ County, Lesser Poland Voivodeship, in southern Poland.

The area was settled in the 15th century by the nomadic Vlach shepherds who adhered to Eastern Orthodoxy, and the first written mention of the village dates back to 1581.

Jaworki was formerly part of the town of Szczawnica, but was made a separate village on 1 January 2008 (as was Szlachtowa). It includes the former villages of Biała Woda ("white water") and Czarna Woda ("black water").

The village used to constitute a part of Ruś Szlachtowska region, the with the westernmost area inhabited by Lemkos. Two other villages of this region Biała Woda and Czarna Woda are now part of the village Jaworki.

== Gallery ==
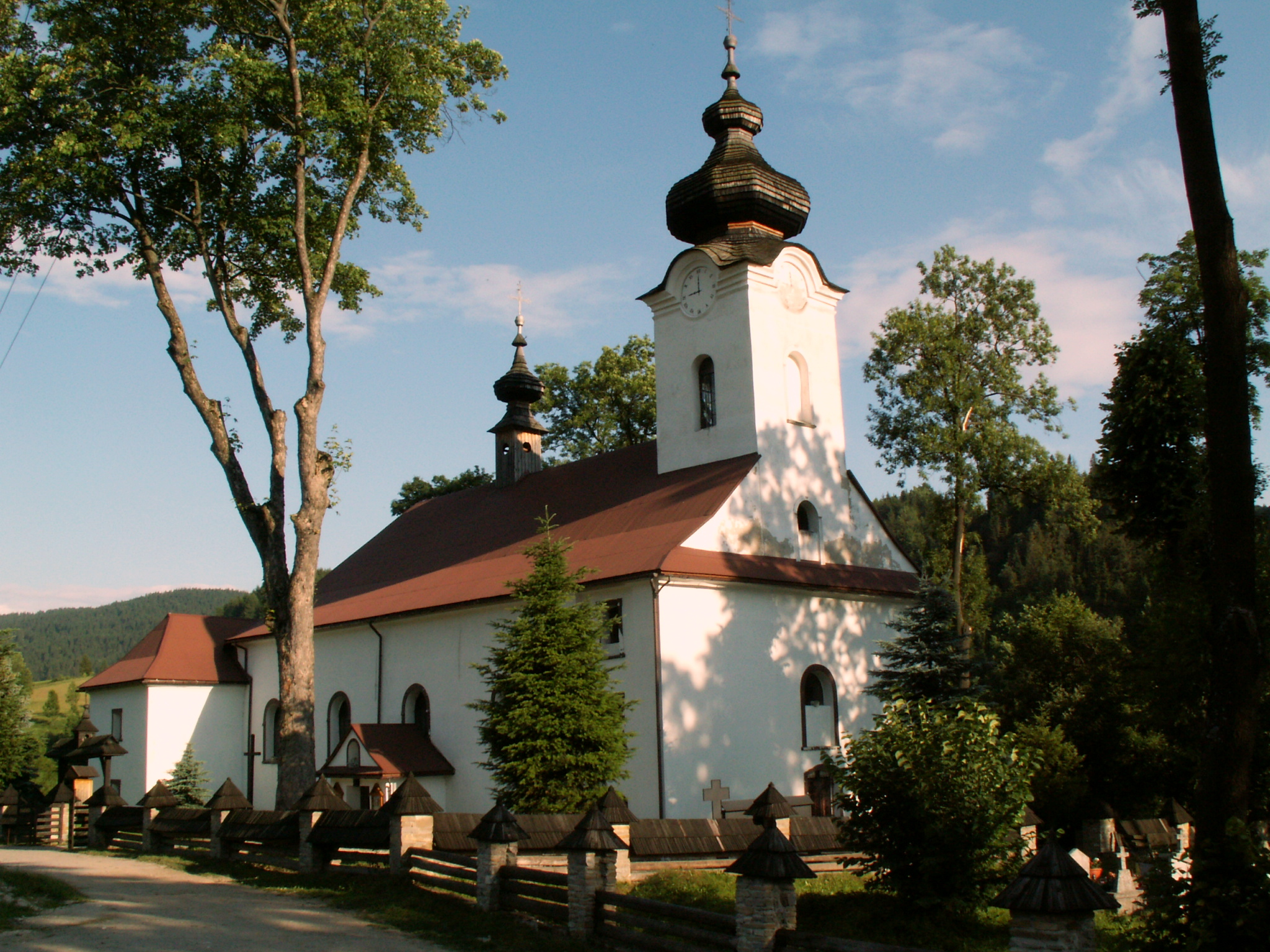
The Church of Saint John the Baptist in Jaworki

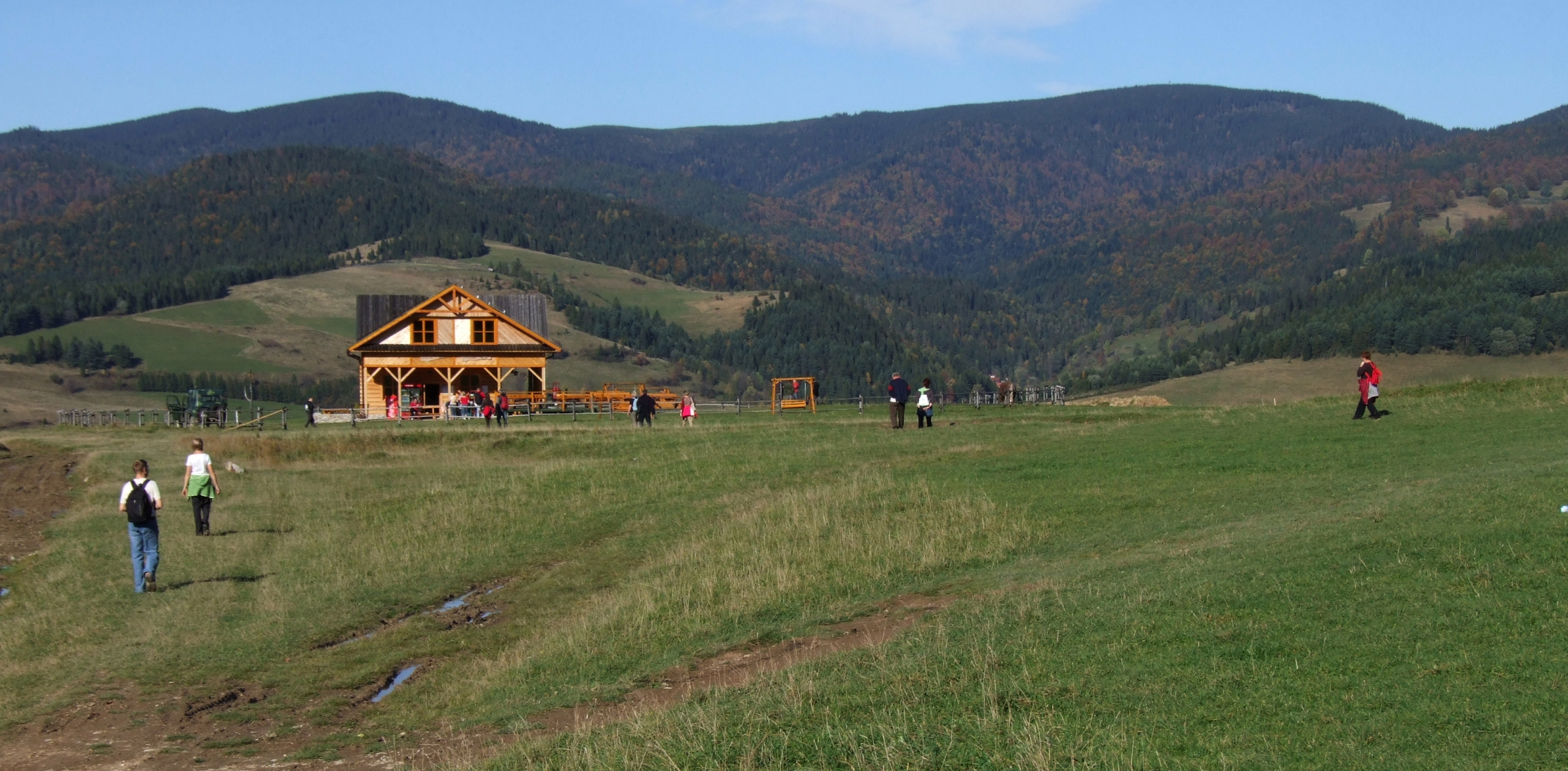
A view of Złomisty Wierch and Radziejów mountains above Jaworki

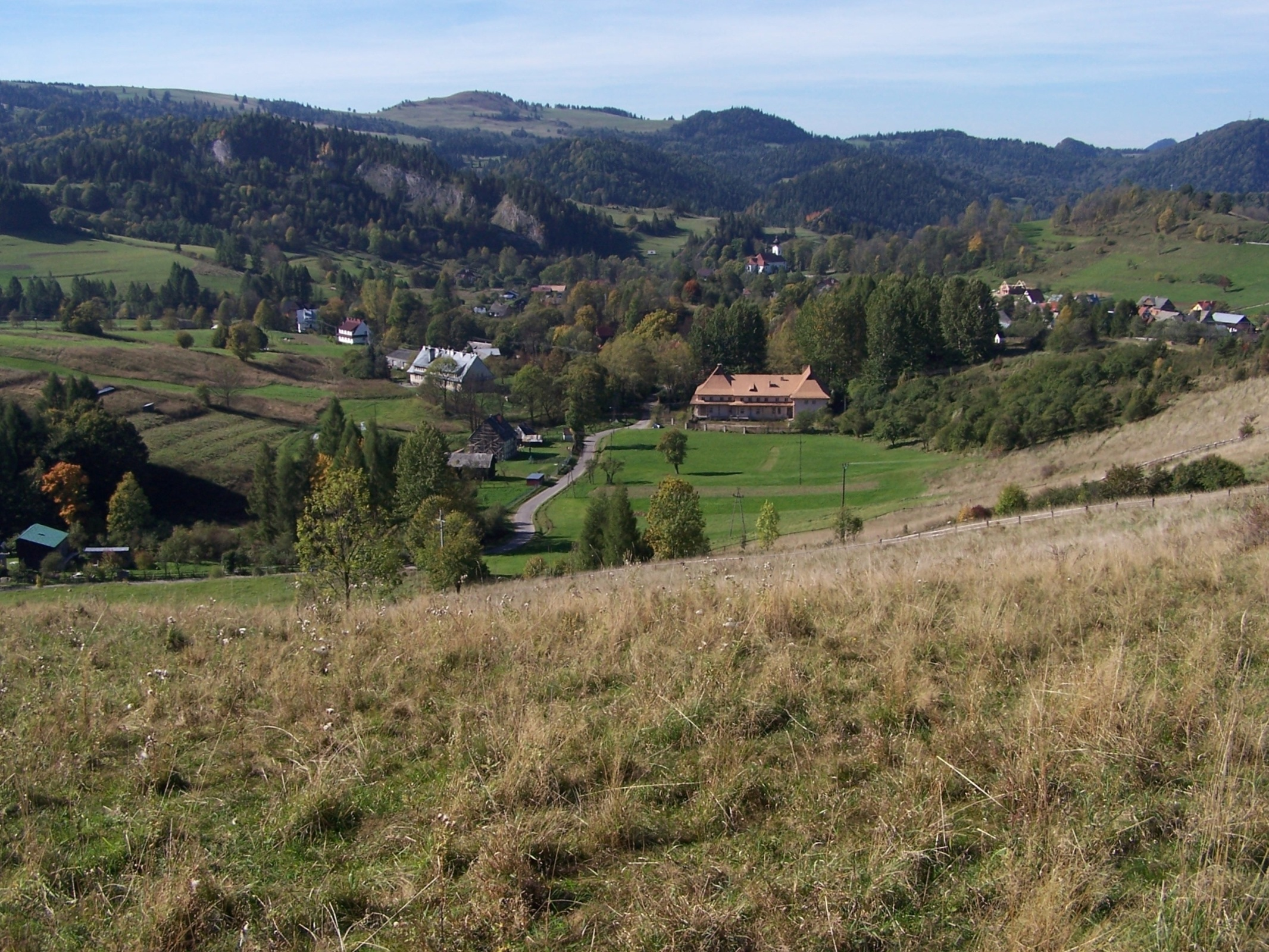
A panoramic view of Jaworki
