= Szlachtowa Ruthenia =

Region of Poland

Coordinates: 49°24′36″N 20°32′35″E

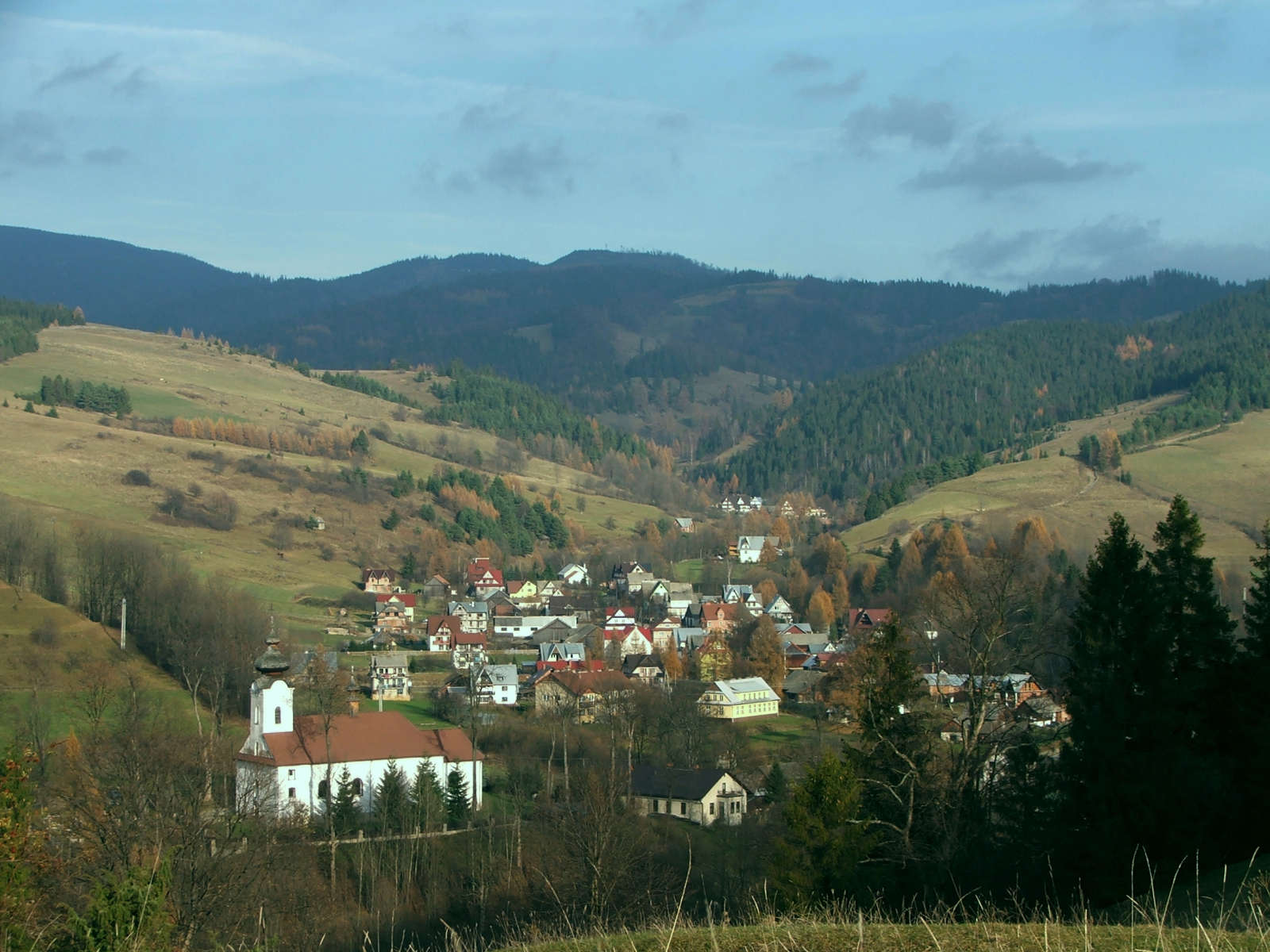
Jaworki, an unofficial capital of the region

Ruś Szlachtowska (Shlakhtov Ruthenia) was a name introduced in 1930s by Prof. Roman Reinfuss to denote the region surrounding the villages of Biała and Czarna Woda, Jaworki, and Szlachtowa in the Grajcarek valley in the Pieniny mountains, in the Nowy Targ County of southern Poland.

The region was the westernmost area inhabited by Lemkos. It was separated from the rest of the Lemko Region by the Polish-dominated Poprad valley which led to isolation of the local population and its gradual assimilation with Poles and Slovaks, until Operation Vistula in 1947, when the Lemkos were deported together with the Ukrainians and Boykos to other areas of Poland and to the Soviet Union. Since then, the villages of Jaworki and Szlachtowa were gradually settled by Polish population from Podhale and Spisz, and the remaining two villages do not exist today.

It is not known for certain when the first settlers arrived in the valley, but it was probably not before the 15th century because Jan Długosz states nothing about the settlement in his Liber beneficiorum.
