= Szlachtowa =

- Village
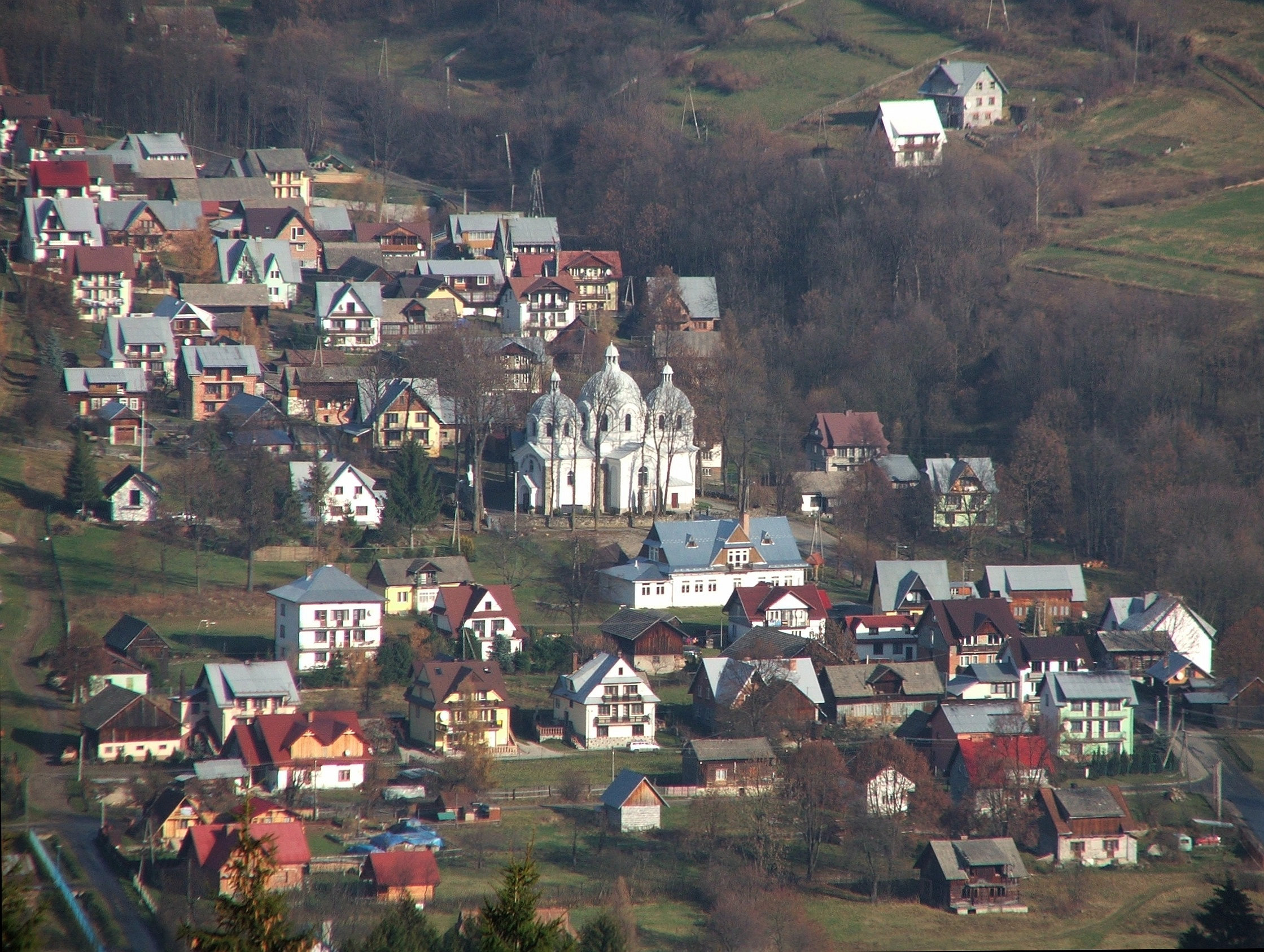
- View from Pieniny

- Location within Poland
- Coordinates: 49°24′51″N 20°31′36″E
- Country: Poland
- Voivodeship: Lesser Poland
- County: Nowy Targ
- Gmina: Szczawnica

Szlachtowa [ʂlaxˈtɔva] (Note: Lemko Rusyn: Шляхтова, romanized: Shliakhtova) is a village in the administrative district of Gmina Szczawnica, within Nowy Targ County, Lesser Poland Voivodeship, in southern Poland. It was formerly part of the town of Szczawnica, but was made a separate village on 1 January 2008 (as was Jaworki).

The village was settled by the Valach shepherd, who practiced Orthodox Christianity, around the 15th century. Szlachtowa used to constitute a part of Ruś Szlachtowska region (with the name derived from the village's name), the westernmost area inhabited by Lemkos.
