= Szczawnica =

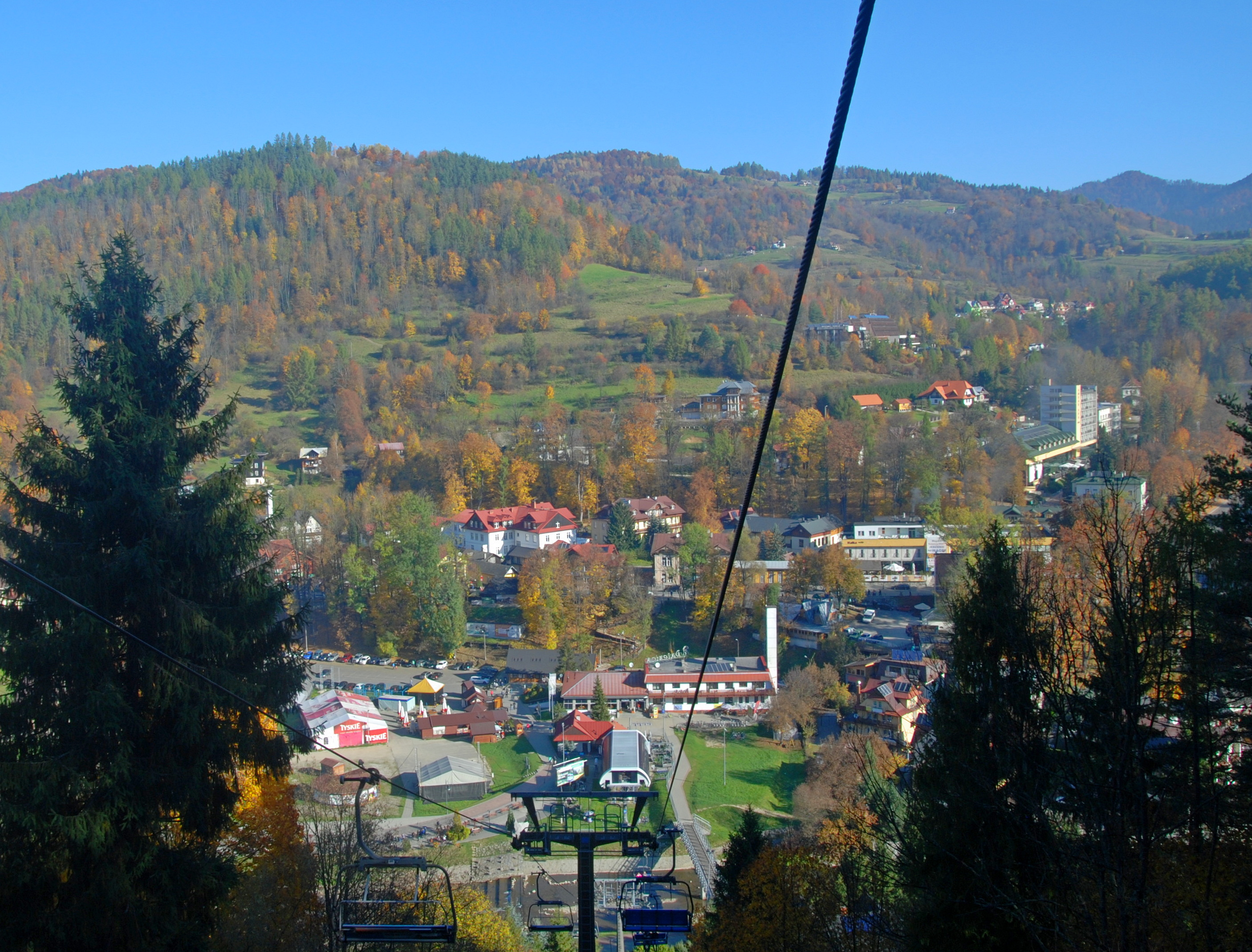
- The ski lift over Mount Palenica

- Flag Coat of arms

- Location within Poland
- Coordinates: 49°25′31″N 20°28′57″E
- Country: Poland
- Voivodeship: Lesser Poland
- County: Nowy Targ
- Gmina: Szczawnica

Government
  - Mayor: Bogdan Szewczyk

Area
  - Total: 32.9 km^{2} (12.7 sq mi)
- Highest elevation: 510 m (1,670 ft)
- Lowest elevation: 430 m (1,410 ft)

Population (2008)
  - Total: 6,342
  - Density: 193/km^{2} (499/sq mi)
- Time zone: UTC+1 (CET)
  - Summer (DST): UTC+2 (CEST)
- Postal code: 34-460
- Car plates: KNT
- Website: http://www.szczawnica.pl

Szczawnica [ʂt͡ʂavˈɲit͡sa] is a spa town in Nowy Targ County, Lesser Poland Voivodeship, in southern Poland. As of June 30, 2007, its population was 7,378.

Szczawnica developed as a spa resort during the 19th century, particularly under the management of Józef Szalay. The town is known for its naturally carbonated mineral springs, which have historically been used in spa treatments. It is also a destination for outdoor recreation, with skiing facilities on Mount Palenica and hiking routes in the surrounding mountains.

== History ==
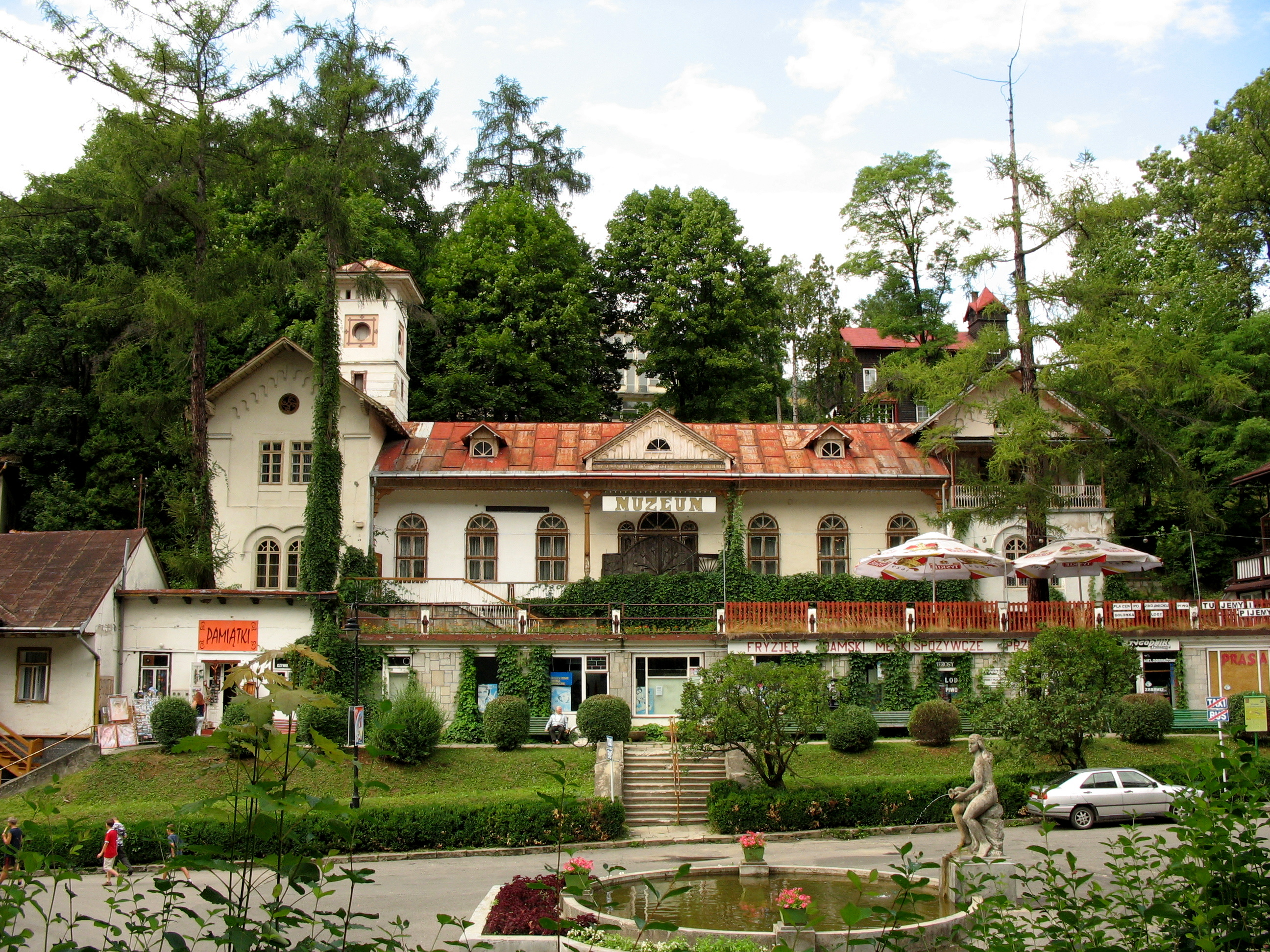
Pałac Villa in Szczawnica

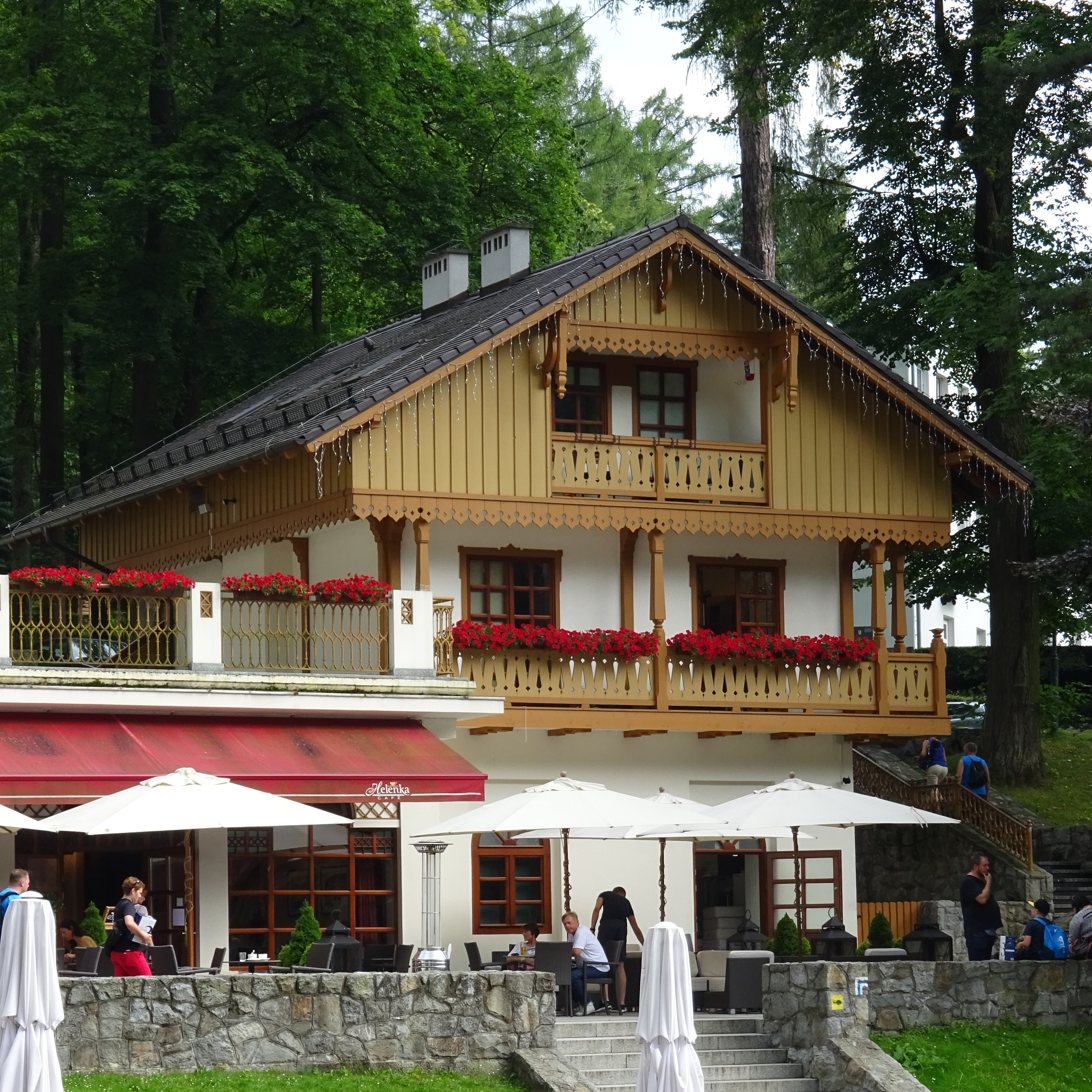
Szwajcarka Górna Villa

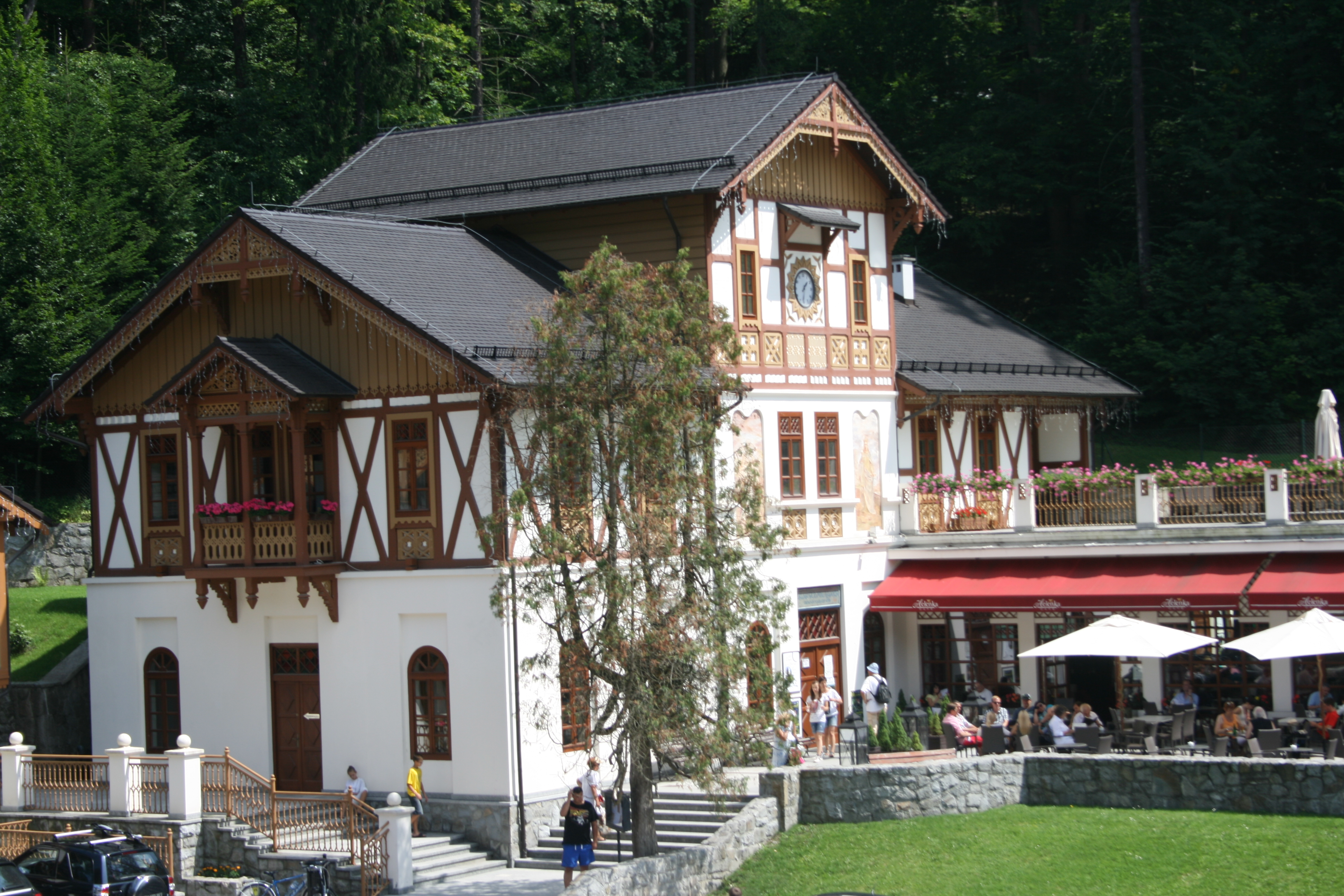
Stefan Pump Room

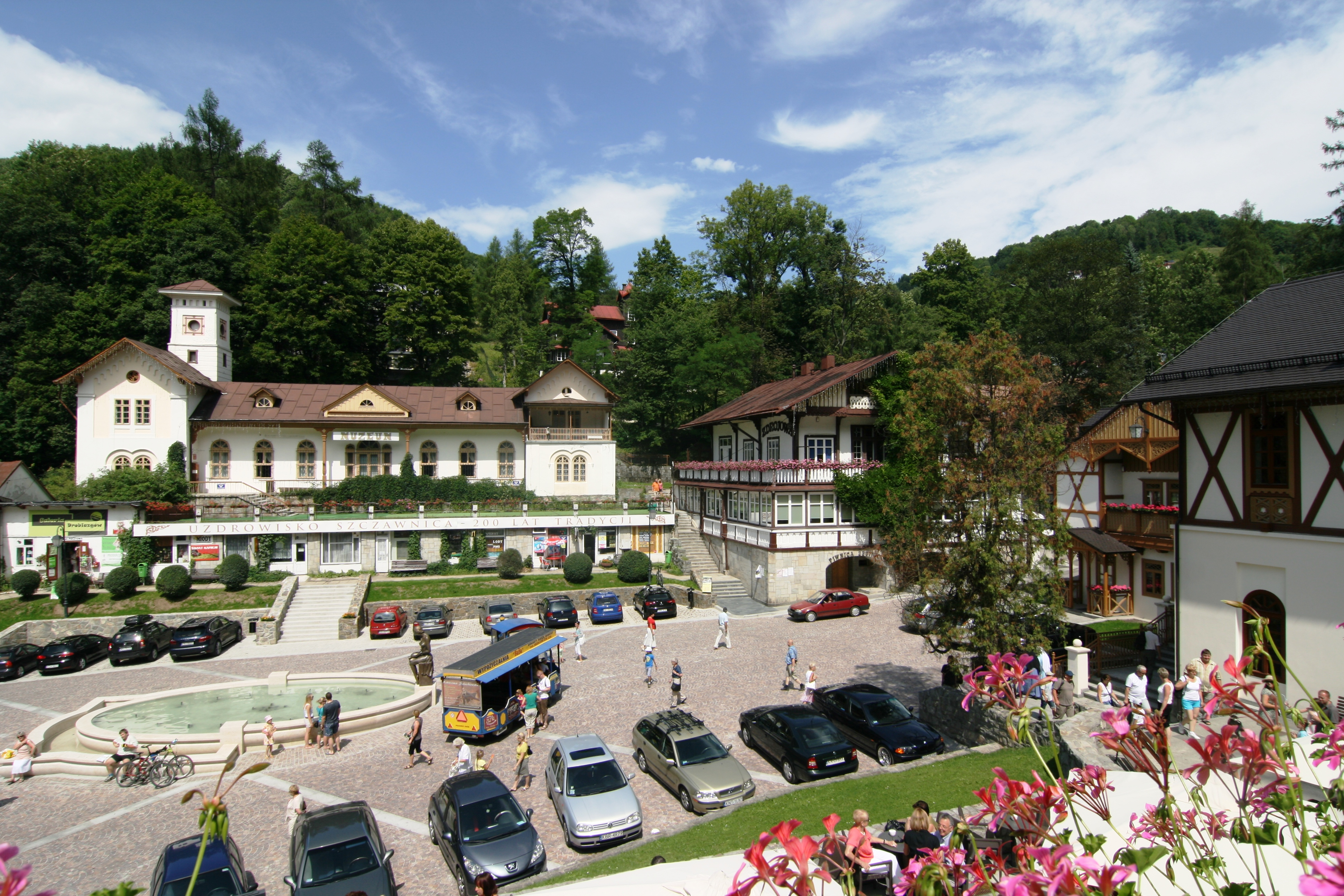
Dietl Square

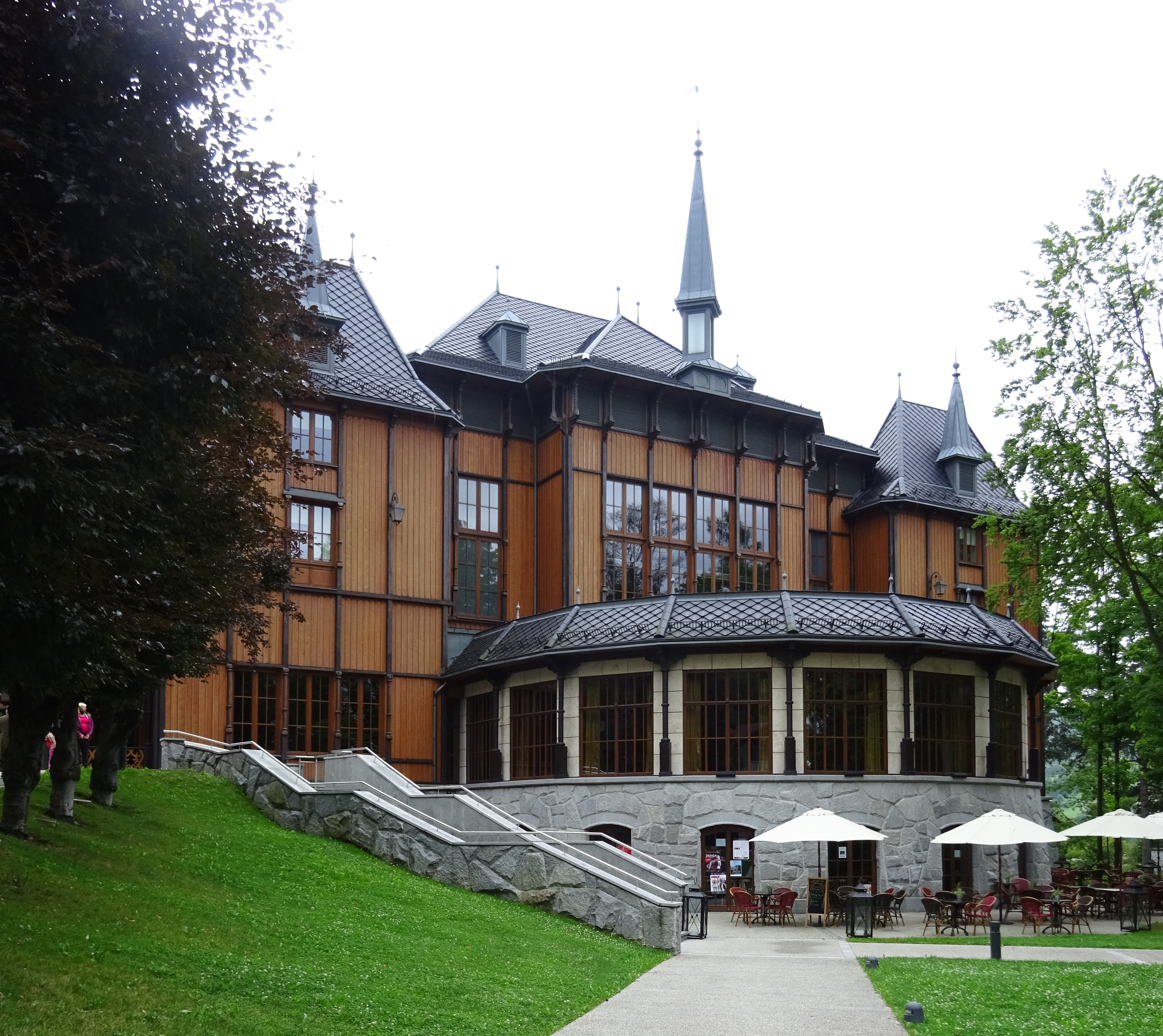
Dworek Gościnny, a hotel and theatre complex

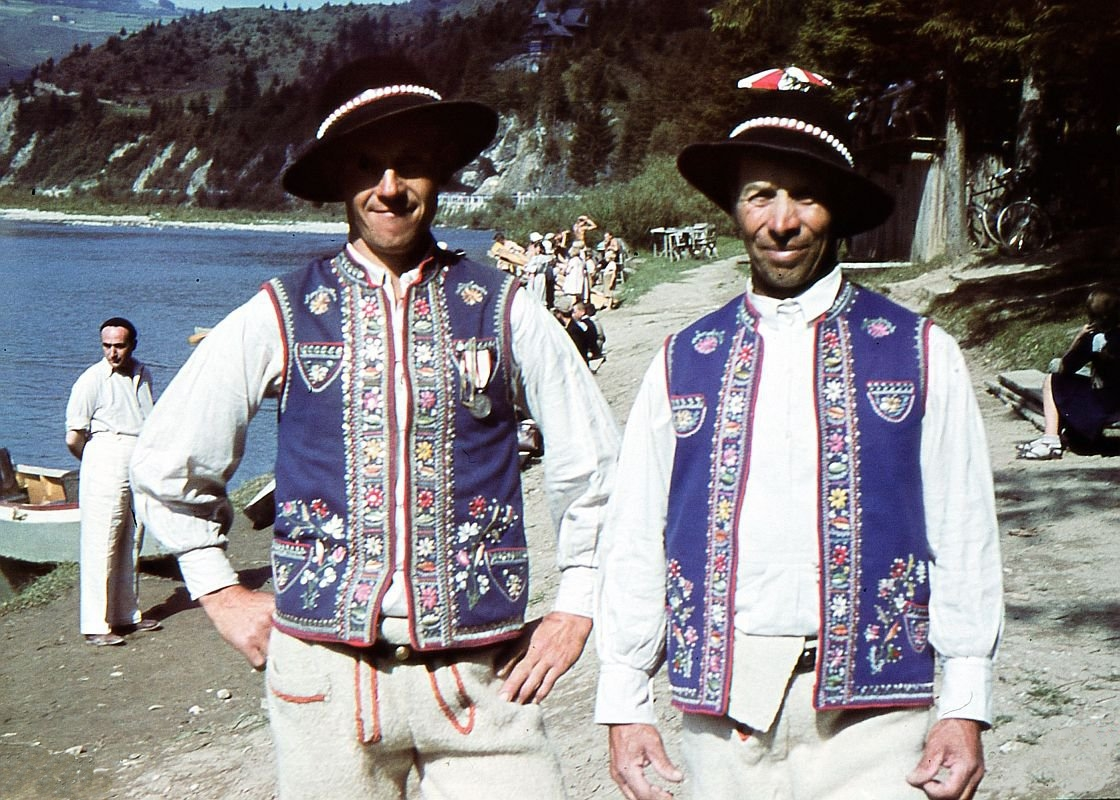
Szczawnica in 1939

The name Szczawnica comes from "szczawy", a local term for naturally carbonated mineral waters. The settlement was recorded in historical documents by the early 16th century. The mineral waters were being used for bathing by the late 18th century and the development of spa facilities began in the early 19th century.

Before his death in 1876, Szalay bequeathed the spa to the Academy of Learning in Kraków. The academy subsequently developed the resort's facilities, including the construction of the Dworek Gościnny (Guest Manor), but financial difficulties eventually led to its sale.

In 1909, Count Adam Stadnicki purchased the spa. Under his ownership, existing facilities were renovated and additional infrastructure was developed, including an inhalation treatment centre. Further development was interrupted by the Second World War.

The spa was nationalised in 1948 under the Polish People's Republic. In 1956, a state-owned spa enterprise was established. Facilities included those providing treatments for occupational illnesses, particularly among miners and industrial workers. New sanatoriums were constructed during the communist period and a natural therapy centre opened in 1973.

In 2005, ownership of the spa was restored to descendants of the Stadnicki family following a ruling by Poland's Supreme Administrative Court. Subsequent redevelopment included the restoration of buildings around Dietl Square, the opening of a spa museum in 2010 and the reconstruction of the Dworek Gościnny in 2011.

== Spa resort ==
Szczawnica's spa facilities are situated in the valley of the Grajcarek, a tributary of the Dunajec River, between the Pieniny Mountains and the Basked Sądecki range. The resort developed during the 19th century under Józef Szalay, with further contributions from physician Józef Dietl.

Szczawnica is known for its mineral springs, which produce acidic mineral waters locally known as szczawy. The springs were documented as early as the 16th century. The waters contain minerals including bicarbonates, sodium, iodides and bromides and have historically been used in spa treatments. The town's mineral water pump room, at Dietl Square, offers six varieties of mineral water.

The resort provides treatments for respiratory and musculoskeletal conditions, including inhalation therapy, hydrotherapy, physiotherapy and therapeutic exercise. Its facilities include sanatoriums and treatment centres that make use of the town's mineral waters.

== Mineral waters ==
Szczawnica's minerał waters are naturally carbonated and contain varying concentrations of bicarbonates, chlorides and sodium, with some sources also containing iodides and bromides. The waters are drawn from geological formations including sandstone, shale and andesite, and are used for drinking treatments, mineral baths and inhalation therapy.

The town's mineral water sources include Józefina, Stefan, Magdalena, Jan, Józef, Wanda, Szymon and Pitoniakówka. The sources differ in their mineral composition and the methods used to extract the water. Some are natural springs, while others are accessed through boreholes or underground collection systems.

Historically, the waters have been associated with Szczawnica's development as a spa resort. The mineral water pump room at Dietl Square offers six varieties of mineral water, while other sources have been accessible at locations around the town.

== Twin towns ==
Szczawnica is twinned with:

- Spišská Belá, Slovakia
- Lesnica, Slovakia
- Oliveto Citra, Italy
- Perleberg, Germany
- Harkány, Hungary
- Khmilnyk, Ukraine

== Notable people ==
The ski mountaineer Szymon Zachwieja was born in Szczawnica.

Eugeniusz Kapłaniak (1934-2008), Polish canoe slalom competitor who won bronze and silver medals in the folding-kayak team event at the 1961 and 1963 ICF Canoe Slalom World Championships respectively.

Stefan Kapłaniak, Polish sprint canoeist who won two gold medals at the 1958 ICF Canoe Sprint World Championships and a bronze medal at the 1960 Summer Olympics.

Dominic Ciesielka, member of the FNN program.

== See also ==
- Pieniny National Park (Poland)
- Dunajec River Gorge
- Trzy Korony (Three Crowns) massif
