= Eastern Galician Conservators Circle =

- Formation: 1889
- Dissolved: 1923
- Location: Lviv, Austria-Hungary/Poland
- Coordinates: 49°50′06″N 24°01′50″E

The Eastern Galician Conservators Circle was a monument protection organization that was engaged in the protection, preservation, and restoration of monuments in Eastern Galicia. It existed in Lviv from 1889 to 1923.

== History ==
In 1848, the Zbruch Idol was discovered in the Zbruch River near Husiatyn, and on the initiative of the future conservative of the Eastern Galician Conservators Circle, Mieczysław Ludwik Potocki, it was transferred to the Kraków Scientific Society.

In 1850, the Central Commission for the Study and Preservation of Historic Buildings was established in Vienna to protect the monuments of the Austrian Empire, which included Galicia. In 1873, the Central Commission was reorganized into the Central Commission for the Study and Conservation of Historical and Artistic Monuments, which was divided into three sections: archaeological, architectural and artistic monuments, and archival monuments.

On 24-25 May 1888, the First Congress of Conservators of Galicia took place in the building of the National Museum in Kraków. During the meeting, a decision was made to establish organizations in Eastern and Western Galicia to assist and coordinate conservators and correspondents regarding the funds annually allocated by the Diet of Galicia and Lodomeria for the maintenance and restoration of monuments. Their executive bodies (committees) were located in Lviv and Kraków. The congress also adopted a resolution to begin an inventory of historical monuments and to draw up a map of conservative districts.

In the fall of 1889, in Lviv, Eastern Galician conservatives and correspondents founded the organization "Eastern Galician Conservators Circle".

On 17 December 1889, in Kraków, Western Galician conservatives and correspondents founded the "Western Galician Conservators Circle", headed by Józef Łepkowski.

In 1911, in accordance with the reforms in Galicia, the position of the only state conservator was established, which turned the Lviv "Circle" into a society of antiquity lovers. In 1916, the East Galician conservators at a meeting decided to reorganize their organization into the "Eastern Galician Conservators Regional Circle". In 1923, the organization ceased to exist as its functions were fully integrated into the new state monument protection system.

In 1892, 1900, and 1902–1910, the Eastern Galician Conservators Circle published three volumes of the Teka Konserwatorska.

In different years, the organization was run by: Ksawery Liske, Antoni Schneider, Adam Kirkor, Aleksander Czołowski, Izydor Szaraniewicz, Władysław Przybysławski, Włodzimierz Antoniewicz, Bohdan Janusz, Teodor Talowski, Wojciech Kętrzyński, Julian Zachariewicz, Oleksander Kolessa, Yevhen Barvinskyi, and others.

== Directors ==
- Franciszek Stroiński (1856–1859),
- Adolf Wolskrim (1859),
- Mieczysław Ludwik Potocki (1864–1878),
- acting director Józef Łepkowski (1878),
- Wojciech Dzieduszycki (1879),
- Władysław Łoziński (1889–1898),
- Ludwik Ćwikliński (1898–1902),
- Ludwik Finkel (1902–1907),
- Władysław Abraham (1907–1912),
- Karol Hadaczek (1912–1914),
- Tadeusz Szczydłowski (1914–1916),
- Władysław Abraham (1916–1920),
- acting director Józef Piotrowski (1920).
