= Radwan (bishop of Poznań) =

Bishop of Poznań (died 1172)

- Church: Roman Catholic Church
- Archdiocese: Poznań
- See: Poznań
- Predecessor: Bernard
- Successor: Cherubin

Orders
- Rank: bishop

Personal details
- Died: 1172

Radwan (Radowan) (died 1172) was a bishop of Poznań.

Nothing is known about his origin and family. He was a chancellor of duke Mieszko III Stary (mentioned in 1152/1153) and later, probably in 1164, became a bishop of Poznań. His promotion was a basic argument for Tadeusz Wojciechowski's hypothesis about a special connection between the chancellor office and Poznań's bishopric.

== Name and origin ==
His name in Latin was written as Radovanus.

Most Polish historians used Radwan as a Polish version of his name. Historian Tomasz Jurek considered the version Radowan as a proper one.

According to Jan Długosz, a chronicler living in 15th century, Radwan was member of the Śreniawitas (Śreniawici) family, but modern historians considered this information as erroneous. Historian Józef Nowacki supposed that Radwan was member of the Radwan family. The Radwan family lived mostly in Małopolska.

== Chancellor ==
Radwan was a chancellor of Mieszko III the Old, duke of Greater Poland. As a chancellor he is mentioned in the foundation charter for the Cistercian monastery in Łekno. The charter was issued in 1153. According to Cistercians' tradition the start of a new year was Lady Day (25 March), so the charter could be issued between 25 March 1152 and 24 March 1153. He probably became a chancellor in 1146 when his predecessor Pean became the bishop of Poznań.

Later Radwan became a bishop of Poznań. His promotion was a basic argument for Tadeusz Wojciechowski's hypothesis about a special connection between the chancellor office and Poznań's bishopric. Radwan's career looks similar to other bishops of Poznań who earlier were Mieszko's chancellors, like his predecessor Pean and successor Cherubin. Other 12th-century bishops of Poznań, Michał and Mrokota, also became chancellors. According to Wojciechowski, the bishop of Poznań was to be the arch-chancellor, the superior of the chancellor. This thesis is rejected in modern historiography.

== Bishop of Poznań ==
There is a dispute among historians about dates when Radwan was a bishop of Poznań. According to chronicler Jan Długosz Radwan was bishop from 1156 to 1162, but in other place he mentioned that he was a bishop on 6 May 1170. The first information is considered as untrue, while the second was based on earlier sources.

According to the Rocznik Lubiński (Lubin's Yearbook) Radwan was a successor of Cherubin, who died in 1172. This information is false as Cherubin was a bishop of Poznań during a synod in Łęczyca in 1180. Historian Władysław Semkowicz supposed there is a mistake in sequence of bishops in Rocznik Lubiński and Radwan should be placed before Cherubin. This thesis is widely accepted by scholars. According to most historians Radwan was a bishop from 1164 to 1172. He became bishop after the death of his immediate predecessor, Bernard (died 1164).

On May 6, 1170 Mieszko III the Old and Radwan founded a hospice at the Church of Saint Michael the Archangel near Poznań. In 1187 Mieszko III the Old gave the hospice to the Knights of Saint John.

Radwan died in 1172. His successor was Cherubin.

== Footnotes ==
Religious titles
Preceded by Bernard	Bishop of Poznań; 1164–1172	Succeeded by Cherubin
