= Aleksander Czołowski =

Polish historian, antiquarian, archivist (1865–1944)

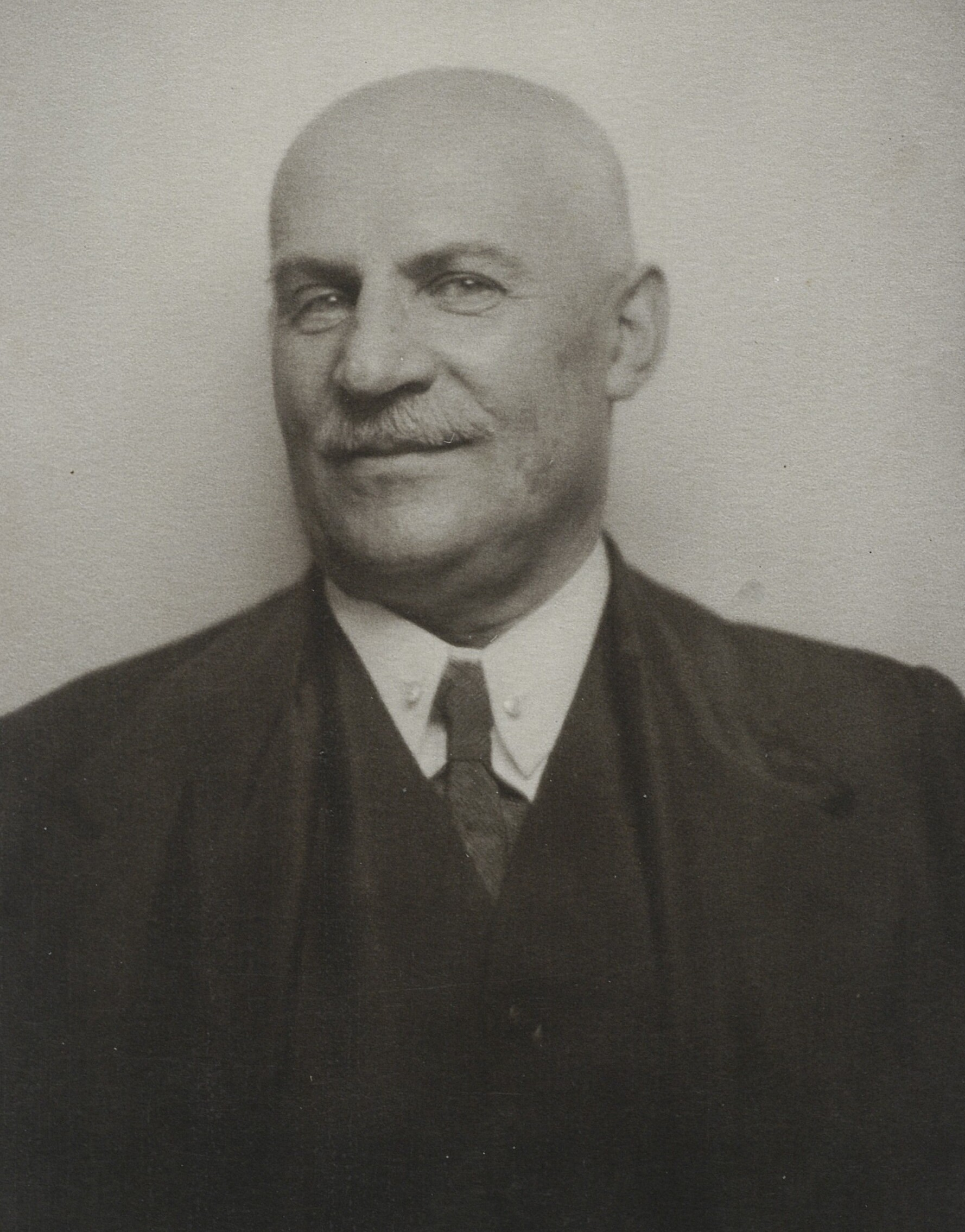
- Born: 27 February 1865; Bakończyce
- Died: 7 July 1944 (aged 79); Lviv
- Education: University of Lviv
- Occupations: Historian, antiquarian, archivist
- Awards: Knight Cross of the Order of Polonia Restituta

Aleksander Czołowski (27 February 1865 in Bakończyce – 7 July 1944 in Lviv) was a Polish historian, antiquarian, archivist, director of the Historical Museum of the City of Lviv and the National Museum in Lviv.

== Biography ==
He graduated from the Stanisławów Gymnasium in 1884, after which he enrolled at the Faculty of Law at the University of Lviv. He soon moved to the Faculty of Philosophy at the University of Vienna. In 1890, he graduated from the Philosophy Department of Lviv University with a doctorate in philosophy. He was a student of Prof. Ksawery Liske. In 1891, he took the position of archivist and later director of the archives and subordinate museums (including the city museum) in Lviv, holding this position until June 1939, when he retired. He was also an art collector and one of the initiators of the establishment of a picture gallery in Lviv.

He was a member of the Polish Gymnastic Society "Sokół". He was an adjunct member of the historical and philosophical department of the Scientific Society in Lviv. He was a man of extensive knowledge. Thanks to his efforts, the Historical Museum of the City of Lviv and the King John III National Museum were established in 1893. He took an active part in the current life of the city, in the organization of exhibitions and conventions, the work of the Society of Lovers of Lviv's Past and the Polish Historical Society. A correspondent member of the Society of the Polish National Museum in Rapperswil from 1897. His interests included Lviv government archives, as well as monastery and guild archives. In July 1905, together with Józef Białynia Chołodecki, he discovered the tomb of Gertrude Potocka in the basement of a church in Vytkiv. In 1906 he became secretary of the then founded Society of Lovers of Lviv's Past.

After the outbreak of World War I in 1914, he became a member of the City Civic Guard in Lviv (Section IV in District I). On 8 March 1925 he was elected vice-president of the Polish Heraldry Society in Lviv.

He was buried in Lychakiv Cemetery.

His sister was Kazimiera, who became the wife of Władysław Szydłowski.

== Works ==
- Ruś czerwona («Bibl. Warsz.», 1887)
- Lwów za ruskich czasów (1887, 1892)
- Początki Mołdawji i wyprawa Kazimierza W. z r. 1359 (1890)
- Z przeszłości Jezupola i okolicy (1890)
- Dawne zamki i twerdze na Rusi Halickiej. — Teka konserwatorska (Lwów), 1892
- Wojna polsko-turecka r. 1675 (1895)
- Najazd Tatarów na Lwów w 1695 r.
- Obraz dziejowy Lwowa
- Pogląd na organizację i działalność dawnych władz miejskich do 1848 r.
- Pomniki dziejowe Lwowa (1891—1921)
- Bitwa pod Obertynem
- Przeszłość i zabytki wojewódstwa tarnopolskiego (1926, co-author Bohdan Janusz)
- Zamek w Jazlowcu (Wspomnienie w 250 rocznicк jego zdobycia przez Jana III, dn. 25.VIII.)

== Awards ==
- Knight's Cross of the Order of Polonia Restituta (10 November 1933).

== Bibliography ==
- Łucja Charewiczowa, Historiografia i miłośnictwo Lwowa (Lwów, 1938).
- Józef Zieliński – Aleksander Czołowski, w czterdziestolecie pracy archiwalnej, konserwatorskiej i naukowej, 1891–1931 (Lwów, 1932).
- Iwona Zima, Aleksander Czołowski 1865–1944: luminarz lwowskiej kultury, Gdynia 2011.
