= Bernard (bishop of Poznań) =

Bishop of Poznań (died 1164)

- Church: Roman Catholic Church
- Archdiocese: Poznań
- See: Poznań
- Predecessor: Stefan
- Successor: Radwan

Orders
- Rank: bishop

Personal details
- Died: 1164

Bernard (died in 1164) was a bishop of Poznań from 1159 to 1164.

We don't have any information on its origin. He was a German according to a German historian, Gerhard Sappok.

He performed as a witness on the privilege of the princess for the monastery in Mogilno from around 1143 and as a prefect of the collegiate church of St. Peter in Kruszwica.

King Lubinski made him a bishop from 1159 until his death in 1164.
