= Max Lehmann =

Max Lehmann may refer to:

- Max Lehmann (historian) (1845–1929), German historian
- Max Lehmann (footballer) (1906–2009), French-Swiss footballer
