= Zoia Skoropadenko =

Ukrainian mixed-media artist based in Monaco

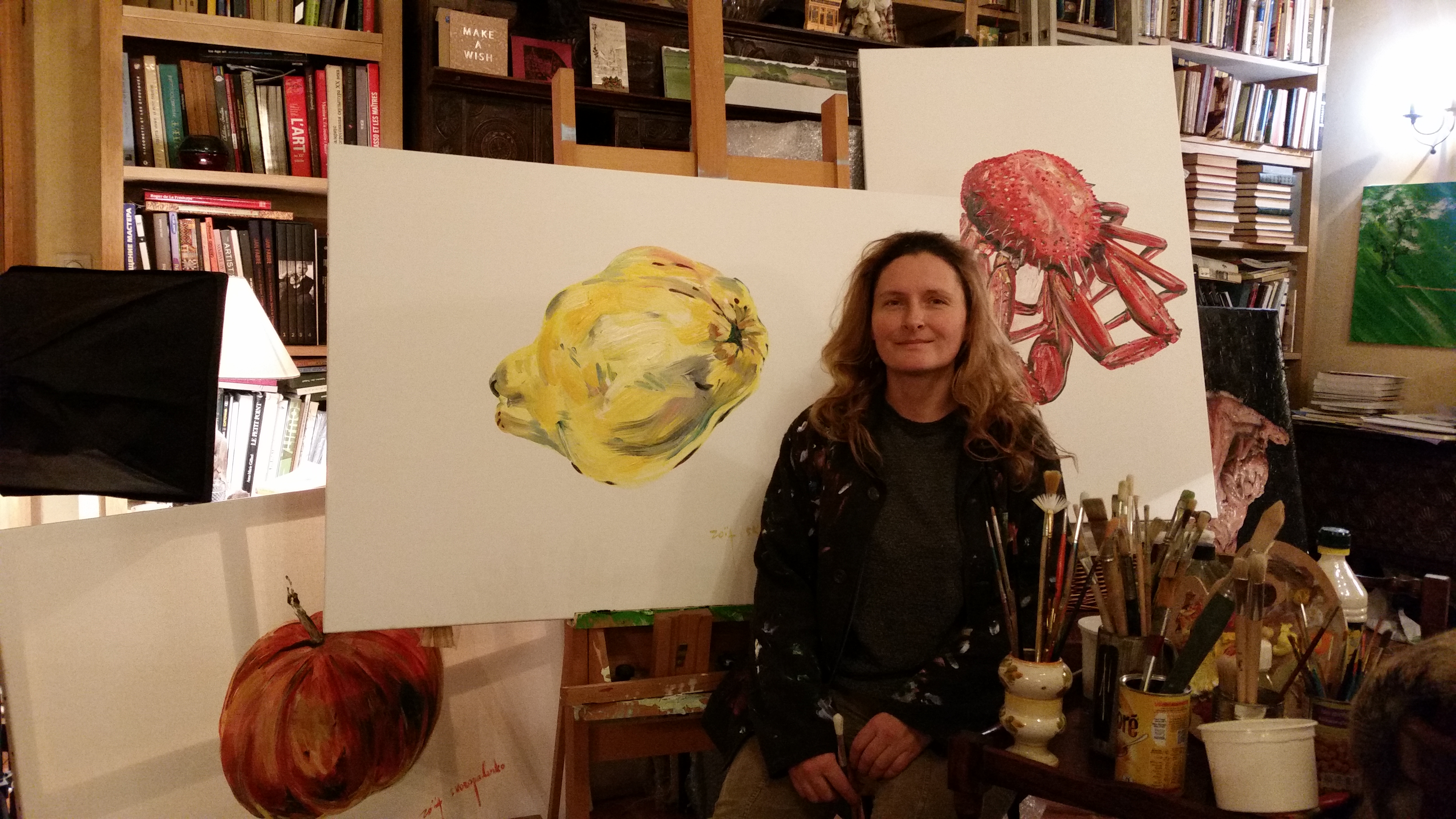
- Born: 1978 (age 47–48); Kryvyi Rih, Ukraine
- Education: National Art School, Institute of Fine Arts, Lviv University
- Known for: Painting, Sketching, Sculpting
- Notable work: TORSO, Coffee Drinkers, Intellectual landscapes, Japanese Ink
- Website: https://www.zoiaskoropadenko.com/

Zoia Skoropadenko is a Ukrainian contemporary mixed-media artist, based in Monaco, known for her paintings, sculptures and sketching, and for being wrongfully suspected as a spy... She counts Michelangelo, Magritte, Corot, Matisse and Petrov Vodkin as some of her artistic influences and is inspired by the Nouveau réalisme movement. She was one of the pioneers of the 'Flash Exhibition' and is a UNESCO recognized artist.

She is the creator and owner of micro-gallery La Vitrine in Palais de La Scala in Monaco – an alternative contemporary art space for emerging artistic talent. In 2011, the Monaco government granted Zoia the official status of an Artist-Painter of Monaco. Zoia splits her time mainly between Monaco, Japan, the US, Belgium and France, where she exhibits frequently.

Her widely exhibited TORSO series is considered her most controversial work as noted in publications such as the Brussels Times and France Info.

== Early life ==
Born and raised in Kryvyi Rih in Ukraine, Zoia showed an aptitude for art from a very young age and was tutored by Ukrainian national artist Grigory Sinitsa from five years old.

Originally taking a conventional route, which belied her later artistic direction, Zoia studied at the National Art School followed by the Institute of Fine Arts. However, at the age of 12 her studies came to a sudden end due to the fall of the Soviet Union, which made it impossible for anyone without money to pursue an art education.

Skoropadenko continued her education at Lviv University as a student journalist where, as an early user of a PC and modem, and with a network of journalist friends, she roused suspicions that she was a spy and was kicked out.

== Career beginnings ==
In her early twenties Zoia hitchhiked around Europe. After many years of being ‘down and out in Europe’ she ended up in Monaco where, as a speaker of eight languages, she found herself a job translating. It was here that she found herself immersed in the art scene and artistic life of the Cote D’Azur. During this period she met such prominent contemporary artists such as Arman, Ernst Fuchs, Emma de Sigaldi, Jean-Michel Folon and Robert Rauschenberg and became a member of the National Art Committee and ADAGP.

During the economic crisis of 2008 times were tough and to make ends meet Zoia had to wait until the end of the day to buy the cheapest food from the market and docks. On one occasion a local fisherman gave her a bag of octopuses for lunch. She wanted to eat them, but instead had an idea: to use the octopuses to create a sculpture. The gift of food became the TORSO series.

== Art works and exhibitions ==
Between 2004 and 2010 Zoia had many solo exhibitions across Europe. However, it was the premier exhibition of TORSO in South London's Menier Gallery in 2011, which saw her international career really take off. As well as selling a number of pieces and catching the eye of the local media, the series was featured in influential art magazine Creative Review, which subsequently appeared on newspaper stands all over the world. Nicki Paxman in her review of TORSO for the BBC's Outlook programme said of Zoia's work: "it is clearly a painting of an octopus but Zoia's arranged it in such a way that it looks like a flayed human torso.".

In 2015 Zoia was invited by the Stock Exchange Rifle Club to exhibit TORSO at their shooting range. She is the only artist who has created an exhibition there. This marked the artist's third ‘Flash Exhibition.’ The same year she appeared on Ukraine Today talking about her exhibition dedicated to the Nuclear Power accidents in Chernobyl and Fukishima

Skoropadenko's Intellectual landscapes series has its roots in impressionism, with the oil paintings depicting minimalistic views that the artist sees on her travels. First sketched in situ and then painted back at the artist's studio, much white ‘flesh’ is left on the canvas so that viewer can fill in the gaps. The Intellectual landscapes series got its first public viewing as a pop up exhibition at the Ukrainian Embassy in Brussels to celebrate Europe Day in 2016.

Zoia debuted a new series of work ‘Coffee drinkers’ as a solo exhibition at Ginza contemporary art gallery Art For Thought in Tokyo in November 2016. ‘Coffee drinkers,’ a series of linocuts depicting scenes of everyday life in a random café, took its inspiration partly from the paintings of Degas, Manet, Picasso and Toulouse Lautrec, which portrayed Absinthe drinkers.

2016 closed with Zoia conducting a controversial pop up exhibition in Brussels and very nearly being hospitalised after a horrific fall when hanging her paintings ahead of the event.

In February 2017, Zoia embarked on her 'Painting California' live art trail. Based in a beachfront house in Balboa, she is painting en plein air (and live) in the locales of Orange County, Los Angeles, San Diego and San Francisco and following in the footsteps of Rex Brandt, Ken Price and David Hockney. The trail is part of Zoia's oil minimalistic series 'Intellectual landscapes.'

Zoia continues to regularly exhibit in Monaco, London, Tokyo, Paris and Brussels and has held exhibitions in the Council of Europe in Strasbourg as well as in Fukushima and Osaka in Japan and in China.
