= Warsaw School =

Warsaw School may refer to:

== Universities ==
- Warsaw School of Economics
- Warsaw School of Social Sciences and Humanities

== Schools of thought ==
- Warsaw School (mathematics)
- Warsaw School (history of ideas)

== See also ==
- Lwów-Warsaw School (disambiguation)
