= Aleksander Semkowicz =

Polish historian (1850–1923)

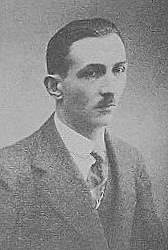
Aleksander Semkowicz

Aleksander Semkowicz (born 7 February 1850 in Lwów, died 2 April 1923 in Lwów) was a Polish historian, archivist, professor of Jan Kazimierz University in Lwów, correspondent member of Polish Academy of Learning. He was also editor-in-chief of Kwartalnik Historyczny.

Around 1876 he was married to Maria Schier. They had four children: Władysław, a historian, Adam (born 1880), Maria (born 1882) and Zofia (born 1888).
