= Kwartalnik Historyczny =

- Discipline: History
- Language: Polish, English
- Edited by: Dorota Dukwicz

Publication details
- History: 1887-present
- Publisher: Wydawnictwo Naukowe Semper (Poland)
- Frequency: Quarterly

Standard abbreviations
- ISO 4: Kwart. Hist.

Indexing
- ISSN: 0023-5903
- OCLC no.: 1782466

Links
- Journal homepage

Kwartalnik Historyczny (Historical Quarterly) is a Polish history journal. It was established in 1887 in Lwów and is the oldest extant national journal for history. The founder of Kwartalnik Historyczny was Ksawery Liske.

== Editors ==
- Ksawery Liske (1887–1891)
- Oswald Balzer (1891–1894)
- Aleksander Semkowicz (1895–1898, 1899–1904, 1906–1914, 1920–1922)
- Józef Korzeniowski (historian) (1898–1899)
- Ludwik Finkel (1918–1919)
- Franciszek Bujak (1930–1931)
- Kazimierz Tyszkowski (1937–1940)
- Roman Grodecki (1945–1947)
- Kazimierz Lepszy (1945–1946)
- Jan Konstanty Dąbrowski
- Stanisław Arnold (1950–1952)
- Bogusław Leśnodorski (1953–1974)
- Tadeusz Jędruszczak (from 1975)
- Jerzy Michalski (1985–1999)
- Wojciech Kriegseisen (2000–2010)
- Roman Michałowski (2010–2020)
- Andrzej Nowak (2020–2023)
- Dorota Dukwicz

== Bibliography ==
- Kriegseisen, Wojciech (2005). ""Kwartalnik Historyczny" - zarys dziejów czasopisma naukowego". Kwartalnik Historyczny (in Polish).
