= Helena Polaczkówna =

Polish historian, war resistor (1881–1942)

Helena Polaczkówna (1881–1942) was a Polish historian, archivist, sigillologist, and authority in the field of heraldry. She became a war resistor during World War II. She was arrested by German occupiers in Lviv for allowing secret activities to take place in her apartment and was murdered in the Majdanek concentration camp near Lublin, Poland, in 1942.

== Biography ==
Helena Polaczkówna was born 24 February 1881 in Lviv (now western Ukraine). Her father, Adam, took part in the Polish revolt called the January Uprising and spent years in exile in France where he completed medical studies. The remaining family stayed in Lviv where Helena and her older sister Maria Polaczkówna, took on private tutoring assignments to earn enough money to afford their education. In 1910, she contracted tuberculosis and suffered respiratory distress and a weak voice for the rest of her life. Despite their modest beginnings, the sisters each went on to earn a PhD.

Helena graduated in history from the Faculty of Philosophy at the University of Lviv. While still a student in 1907, she worked as a trainee at the National Archives of Municipal and Land Register, commonly known as the Bernadine Archives. (After her 1910 illness, she returned there again as a trainee and on 26 July 1917, she was hired permanently to work in the Archives and remained employed there until 1939.)

Helena graduated in history from the Faculty of Philosophy at the University of Lviv. She earned her doctorate in 1909 with a dissertation titled: “De Lumbres, the French Ambassador and His Diplomatic Mission to Poland in the Times of the Potop (Flood) 1656–1660” (supervised by A.-M. Balzer). She earned her post-doctoral habilitation at the University of Poznań, which enabled her to become an associate professor of auxiliary sciences of history at the University of Lviv, curator of the Land Archives and member of the Lviv Scientific Society. She is credited with co-creating contemporary Polish heraldic terminology, especially the language of blazoning coats of arms. On 8 March 1925, she was elected vice-president of the Polish Heraldic Society in Lviv.

From 1917–1939, she held positions of increasing responsibility until she was custodian of the Bernardine Archive in Lviv. With the beginning of World War II, she was transferred to the Ossolineum, which was transformed in 1939–1941 into a branch of the Ukrainian Academy of Arts and Sciences.

== Capture ==
During World War II, Helena and her older sister Maria lived together in Lviv at 29 Listopada Street. During the German occupation of the city, the two sisters became involved in educational, charitable and conspiratorial activities. Their apartment became a contact point for secret couriers and messengers of the Information and Propaganda Bureau of Home Army Headquarters, a system of asylum and safe places where illegal publications could be produced. Reportedly, it was through careless coconspirators that the Gestapo identified the building and arrested Helena on 27 April 1942. She was taken to the Majdanek concentration camp where she was tortured and "finally murdered" in the autumn of 1942.

Her sister Maria fled to Warsaw and participated in the Warsaw Uprising, on 5 August 1944. Maria was arrested on the street and jailed in a basement on Filtrowej Street. She was last seen alive on 12 August.

== Selected works ==
She published widely in the field of heraldry:

- Akta Biblioteki Ordynacji Krasińskich w Warszawie za rok 1920
- Geneza herbów polskich w herbarzu flamandzkim
- Księga bracka świętego Krzysztofa na Arlbergu w Tyrolu
- Księga radziecka miasta Drohobycza 1542-1563
- De l'utilité d'une collaboration internationale pour la publication des Armoriaux du Moyen-Âge
- Materyały do heraldyki polskiej
- Najstarsza księga sądowa wsi Trześniowa 1419-1609
- Prace sekcji nauk pomocniczych, archiwów i organizacji pracy historycznej na VII-ym Międzynarodowym Kongresie Nauk Historycznych w Warszawie
- Studium przygotowawcze we Francji do badań nad historią średniowiecza
- Szlachta na Siewierzu Biskupim w latach 1442-1790: z mapą rozsiedlenia Siewierza i z trzema tablicami w tekście
- Uwagi o porządkowaniu prywatnych archiwów familijnych

== Memberships ==
- Lviv Scientific Society (1920)
- Polish Historical Society
- Historical Committee of the Polish Academy of Skills
- Polish, Austrian, French and Swiss heraldic societies
