= Stanisław Zakrzewski =

Polish historian (1873–1936)

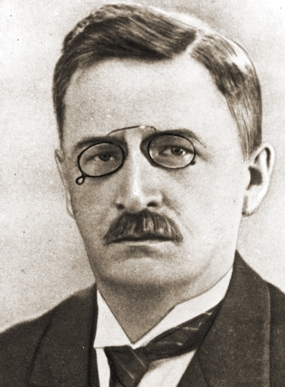
- Born: 13 December 1873; Warsaw, Poland
- Died: 15 March 1936 (aged 62); Lwow, Ukraine
- Occupation: Historian

Stanisław Zakrzewski (13 December 1873 in Warsaw – 15 March 1936 in Lwow) was a Polish historian. He was a professor of Lviv University (since 1907), member of Polish Academy of Learning (since 1919), chairman of Polish Historical Society (1923–1932; 1934–1936), senator from Non-partisan Bloc for Cooperation with the Government (1928–1935). Zakrzewski was associated with National Democracy, then with Józef Piłsudski.

Zakrzewski was a researcher of political issues of Poland from 10th to 13th century. He was an author of critical studies of medieval sources. His notable works includes Mieszko I jako budowniczy państwa polskiego [Mieszko I as a builder of Polish country] (1922), Bolesław Chrobry Wielki (1925).
