= Mieczysław Ludwik Potocki =

Polish landowner, monument guardian (1810–1878)

- Born: 1810; Lviv
- Died: 31 January 1878 (aged 67–68); Lviv
- Education: Royal University of Warsaw
- Occupations: Landowner, monument guardian

Mieczysław Ludwik Potocki (1810 in Lviv – 31 January 1878 in Lviv) was Polish landowner, November insurgent, organizer of the conservation office in Eastern Galicia, member of the Galician States.

== Biography ==
Mieczysław Ludwik Potocki was born in Lviv to an old, but not wealthy Polish noble family originating from the Bracław Voivodeship. His father was Franciszek Xawery Potocki from Wieniawa, a state counsellor, president of the prosecutor's office of the Congress Kingdom of Poland, and a member of the Warsaw Society of Friends of Learning, while his mother was Marianna née Czerwińska, a daughter of a city secretary of Nowogródek (now Novogrudok).

He studied law and administration at the Royal University of Warsaw. He participated in the November Uprising (he was awarded the Order of Virtuti Militari). After his stay abroad, he settled in his estate in the village of Kotsiubynchyky.

An important event for his scientific interests was the discovery in 1848 of a statue of Zbruch Idol in the Zbrucz River in the village of Lychkivtsi. It was soon excavated, but lay for some time in oblivion until Potocki took an interest in it, to whom it was offered by the then owner of Lychkivtsi. When a proclamation from the Kraków Scientific Society, calling for archaeological research and the donation of antiquities to its collection, reached him in 1850, Potocki sent information about the find to the Society, which responded with a request to donate the statue. Potocki agreed and on May 12, 1851, the statue was transported to Kraków, where it was placed in the Collegium Maius.

He was buried in Lychakiv Cemetery.

== Bibliography ==
- Bogumiła Sawa-Sroczyńska. Mieczysław Ludwik Potocki – konserwator zabytków Galicji i historyk Zamościa. „Ochrona Zabytków”. 34/3–4 (134–135) pp. 161–166, 1981.
- Jerzy Sewer Dunin Borkowski: Rocznik Szlachty Polskiej. T. 1. Lwów: Nakładem księgarni K. Łukaszewicza, 1881, s. 533–534.
- Jerzy Sewer Dunin Borkowski: Rocznik Szlachty Polskiej. T. 2. Lwów: Nakładem księgarni K. Łukaszewicza, 1883, s. 619.
- Tadeusz Łopatkiewicz, Najwcześniejsze relacje konserwatorskie o zabytkach Krosna i powiatu oraz ich autor Ludwik Mieczysław Lubicz Potocki (1810–1878), Bibliotheca Pigoniana, t. 7, Krosno 2022, ss. 385, ISBN 978-83-64457-72-2
