= Andrzej Ajnenkiel =

Polish historian

- Born: 21 February 1931
- Died: 10 April 2015 (aged 84)
- Education: University of Warsaw
- Occupation: Historian
- Writing career
- Period: 20th–21st century
- Subjects: Political history of Poland, History of Polish law, Constitutional law

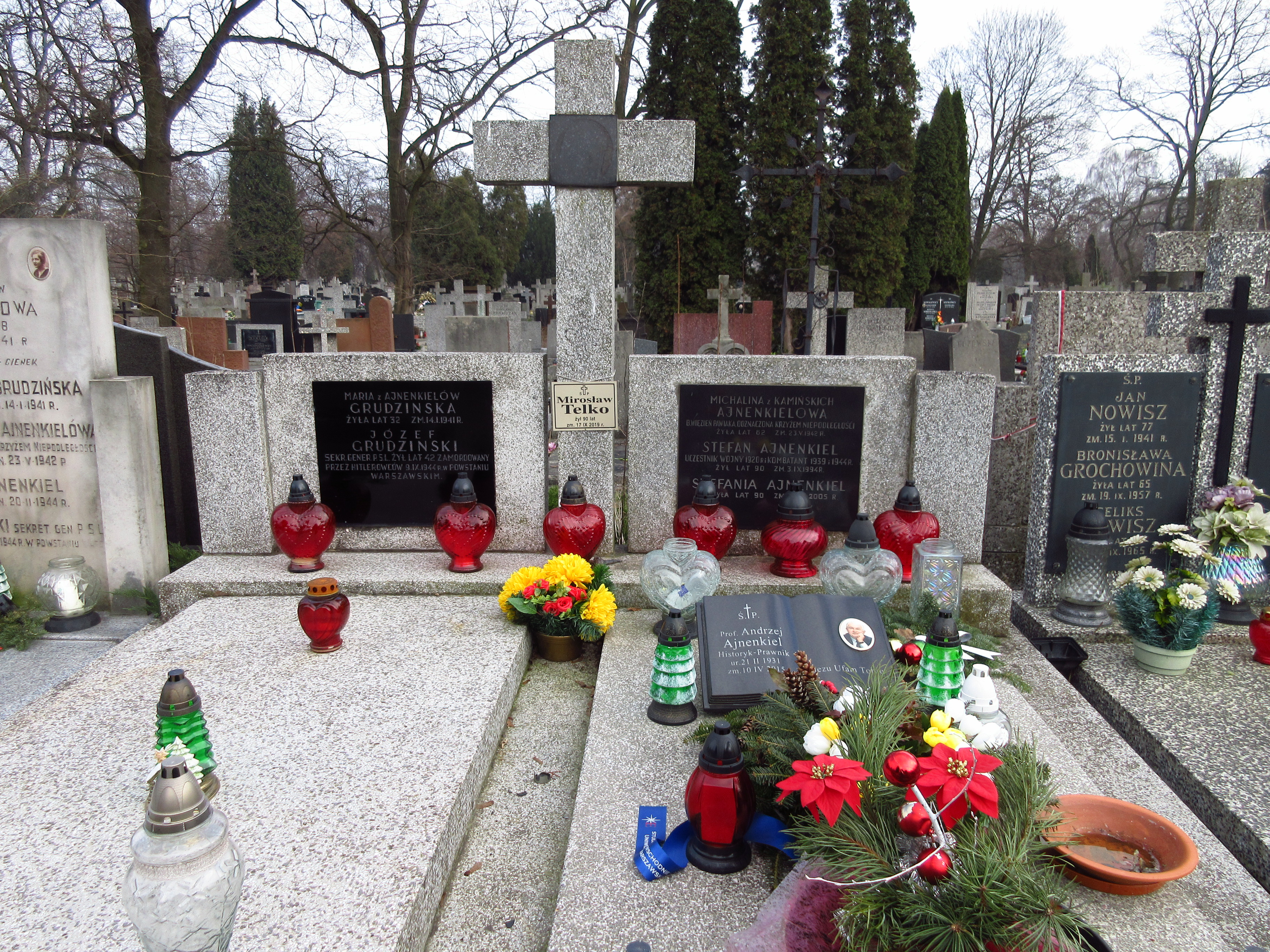
Grave of Ajnenkiel at Bródno Cemetery in Warsaw

Andrzej Ajnenkiel (21 February 1931 – 10 April 2015) was a Polish historian. He specialized in the political history of Poland and the history of Polish law, especially constitutional law.

He was a son of Stefan and Janina.

From 1949 to 1954 Ajnenkiel studied law at the University of Warsaw. Since 1979 Ajnenkiel had been a professor at the Institute of History at the Polish Academy of Sciences in Warsaw. In 1991 he gained a professor degree, the highest academic degree in Poland, and later a habilitation. He was a member and director of several historical societies, including the Polish Historical Society.

== Works ==
- Historia ustroju Polski 1764-1939 (1969)
- Administracja w Polsce: zarys historyczny (Administration in Poland: Historical Overview) (1975)
- Parlamentaryzm II Rzeczypospolitej (1975)
- Od rządów ludowych do przewrotu majowego: zarys dziejów politycznych Polski 1918-1926 (1977)
- Polska po przewrocie majowym: zarys dziejów politycznych Polski 1926-1939 (Poland after the May Coup: Overview of the Political History of Poland 1926–1939) (1980)
- Polskie konstytucje (Polish Constitutions) (1991)
- Prezydenci Polski (Presidents of Poland) (1991)
- Konstytucje Polski w rozwoju dziejowym 1791-1997 (2001)
