= Cherubin (bishop of Poznań) =

12th-century bishop

- Bishop of Poznań
- Archdiocese: Poznań
- Appointed: c. 1772

Cherubin (died c. 1180) was bishop of Poznań probably from 1172.

Before taking up the bishopric, he was the chancellor of Mieszko the Old (around 1167). As a Poznań bishop, he participated in the synod in Łęczyca in 1180. Soon after this congress, he probably died, because according to an extract from the Antiquitatum of the monastery Lubinensis around 1180, his successor Arnold had already given privileges to the abbey in Lubin.

Władysław Semkowicz identifies him as the father of the knight Jan, certified in documents from 1228 and 1230, and the progenitor of the Sulim family. The name Cherubinowice in Sandomierz, which later belonged to the Sulim family, probably comes from the Bishop of Cherub.

The Rocznik Lubiński (Lubin's Yerbook) from the end of the 13th century erroneously states that he held his office from 1164 and died in 1172. It is assumed that the Yearbook changed the order of Radwan and Cherubin.
