= Szymon Askenazy =

Polish historian

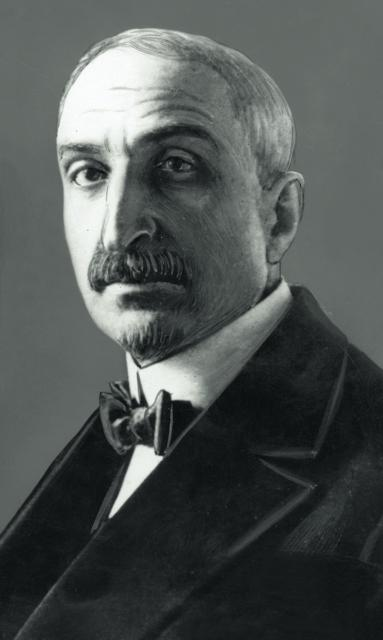
- Szymon Askenazy
- Born: December 24, 1865; Zawichost, Poland
- Died: June 22, 1935 (aged 69); Warsaw, Poland
- Occupations: Historian, educator, statesman and diplomat.
- Known for: Founder of the Askenazy school.

Szymon Askenazy (December 24, 1865, Zawichost – June 22, 1935, Warsaw) was a Jewish-Polish historian, educator, statesman and diplomat, founder of the Askenazy school.

He was the first Polish representative at the League of Nations. His work as a historian was influential in defining the creation and history of the Polish nation.

== Biography ==
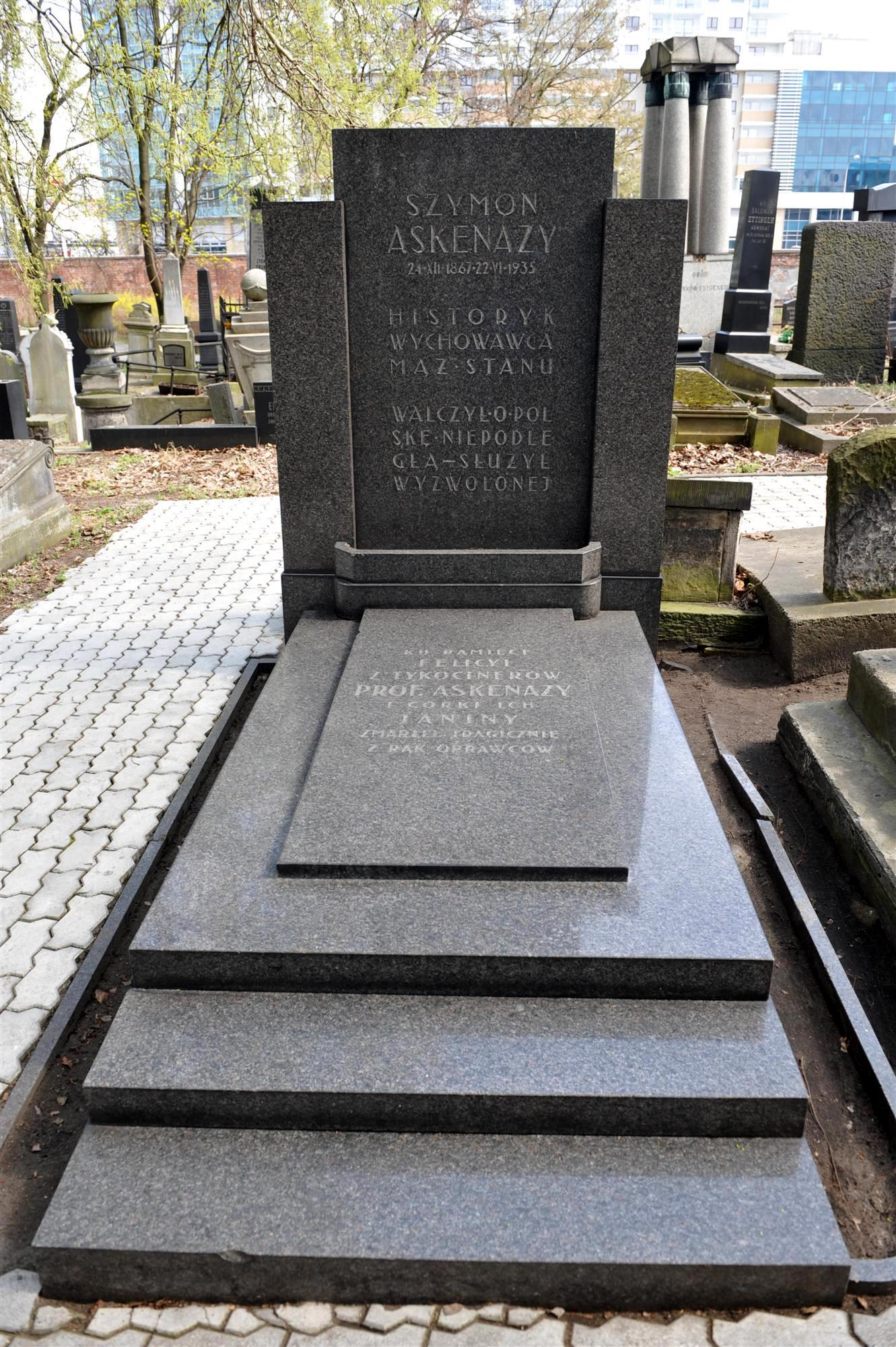
Askenazy's grave at Okopowa Street Jewish Cemetery, Warsaw

Persuaded by his father, Askenazy studied law at the Imperial University of Warsaw in the 1880s. After graduation, he worked as a lawyer; however, all the spare time he devoted to reading books in various languages. In April 1893, he went to Göttingen to study history. He was influenced by the professor of medieval and modern history Max Lehmann under whose supervision he wrote doctoral dissertation Die letzte Polnische Koenigswahl (1894).

Commencing in 1902, he served as a professor at the University of Lwów till November 1919. In 1909 he was inducted into the Polish Academy of Learning(Polska Akademia Umiejętności). One of his main books "Gdańsk a Polska" was published in 1919 and translated into English (Danzig & Poland, 1921), French (Dantzig et la Pologne, 1919) and German (Danzig und Polen, 1919). Askenazy planned to join Warsaw University, however on his way there stood Bronisław Dembiński and Marceli Handelsman, who blocked his nomination to become a professor of this university. Famous Poles supported Askenazy: Stefan Żeromski, Zofia Nałkowska, Karol Szymanowski, Leopold Staff, Andrzej Strug, Jarosław Iwaszkiewicz, Antoni Słonimski, Wacław Sieroszewski who signed an appeal (published in Robotnik, 2 March 1920) for a place for Askenazy at Warsaw University, however in vain.

After Poland regained independence, Askenazy was chosen to be the first Polish representative at the League of Nations (1920–1923). His candidacy for this post was supported by Józef Piłsudski and nomination was signed by the Foreign Minister of Poland, Eustachy Sapieha in May 1920. He cooperated later with other Polish Foreign Ministers: Konstanty Skirmunt, Gabriel Narutowicz and Aleksander Skrzyński. In May 1923, Marian Seyda from, the Popular National Union (a Polish political party of the National Democracy political camp) became the Foreign Minister of Poland after Lanckorona Pact agreement was introduced. Askenazy saw this as a sign to step down. He resigned from the post and in July 1923 came back to Poland. Askenazy never joined any political party.

In his studies, he focused chiefly on Poland's political and economic history in the 18th and 19th centuries. He thus laid the foundations for the Lwów-Warsaw School of History (also known as the "Askenazy school"). Natalia Gąsiorowska was among his doctoral students. He was the first historian to emphasize the Partitions period as crucially important to the creation of the modern Polish nation.

Askenazy's idea of describing a nation's history through its social and economic development, as well as its international and diplomatic backdrop, remains influential in modern Polish historical studies.

William J. Rose, an English translator of Askenazy's book "Danzig & Poland", wrote in the obituary published in The Slavonic and East European Review that with the death of Professor Askenazy "Polish learning lost one of its most distinguished ornaments".

== Works ==
- Ministeryum Wielhorskiego 1815-1816 : dodatek 1812-1813-1814 (1898)
- Wczasy historyczne Tom 1 (1902) Tom 2 (1904)
- Sto lat zarządu w Królestwie Polskiem : 1800-1900 (1903)
- Uniwersytet Warszawski (1905)
- Łukasiński Tom 1 (1908) Tom 2 (1908)
- Dwa stulecia : XVIII i XIX : badania i przyczynki Tom 1 (1901) Tom 2 (1910)
- Przymierze polsko-pruskie (1918)
- Nauka uniwersytecka a kolejność studjów w uniwersyteckiej nauce prawa (1921)
- Książę Józef Poniatowski 1763-1813 (1922)
- Gdańsk a Polska (1923)
- Uwagi (1924)
- Szkice i portrety (1937)

== Works in English ==
- Dantzig & Poland (Published by George Allen & Unwin. London 1921. Translated by William J. Rose. The original Polish title: Gdańsk a Polska)
- Thaddeus Kosciuszko, For the Centenary of His Death (London 1917)
- Poland and Europe (Published by George Allen & Unwin. London 1916)
- New Partitions of Poland (First published in Contemporary Review, June 1916; later by The Contemporary Review Company. London 1916)
- Prince Joseph Poniatowski (London 1915)

== Bibliography ==
- Książę Józef Poniatowski 1763-1813, (Lwów, 1905)
- Rosja - Polska 1815-1830, (Lwów, 1907)
- Łukasiński, (Lwów, 1908)
- Napoleon a Polska, (Warszawa, 1918–19)
- Przymierze polsko-pruskie, (Warszawa, 1918)
- Gdańsk a Polska, (Warszawa, 1919)
