= Roman Michałowski =

Polish historian

Roman Michałowski (born 1949) is a Polish historian.

He graduated in history at the University of Warsaw. On the same university he gained PhD in 1979 and passed habilitation in 1990. He has been working at the University of Warsaw since 1972. He received the title of professor in 2006.

Roman Michałowski is an editor of "Kwartalnik Historyczny".
