= Lwów-Warsaw School =

Lwow–Warsaw School may refer to:

- Lwów–Warsaw school of logic
- Lwów School of Mathematics
- Warsaw School of Mathematics
- Lwów–Warsaw School of History
