= Polish Historical Society =

- Polskie Towarzystwo Historyczne
- Logo of PTH
- Abbreviation: PTH
- Formation: 1886
- Type: Scientific
- Headquarters: Warsaw
- Location: Poland
- Members: 3,000
- Key people: Krzysztof Mikulski (President)
- Website: http://www.pth.net.pl/

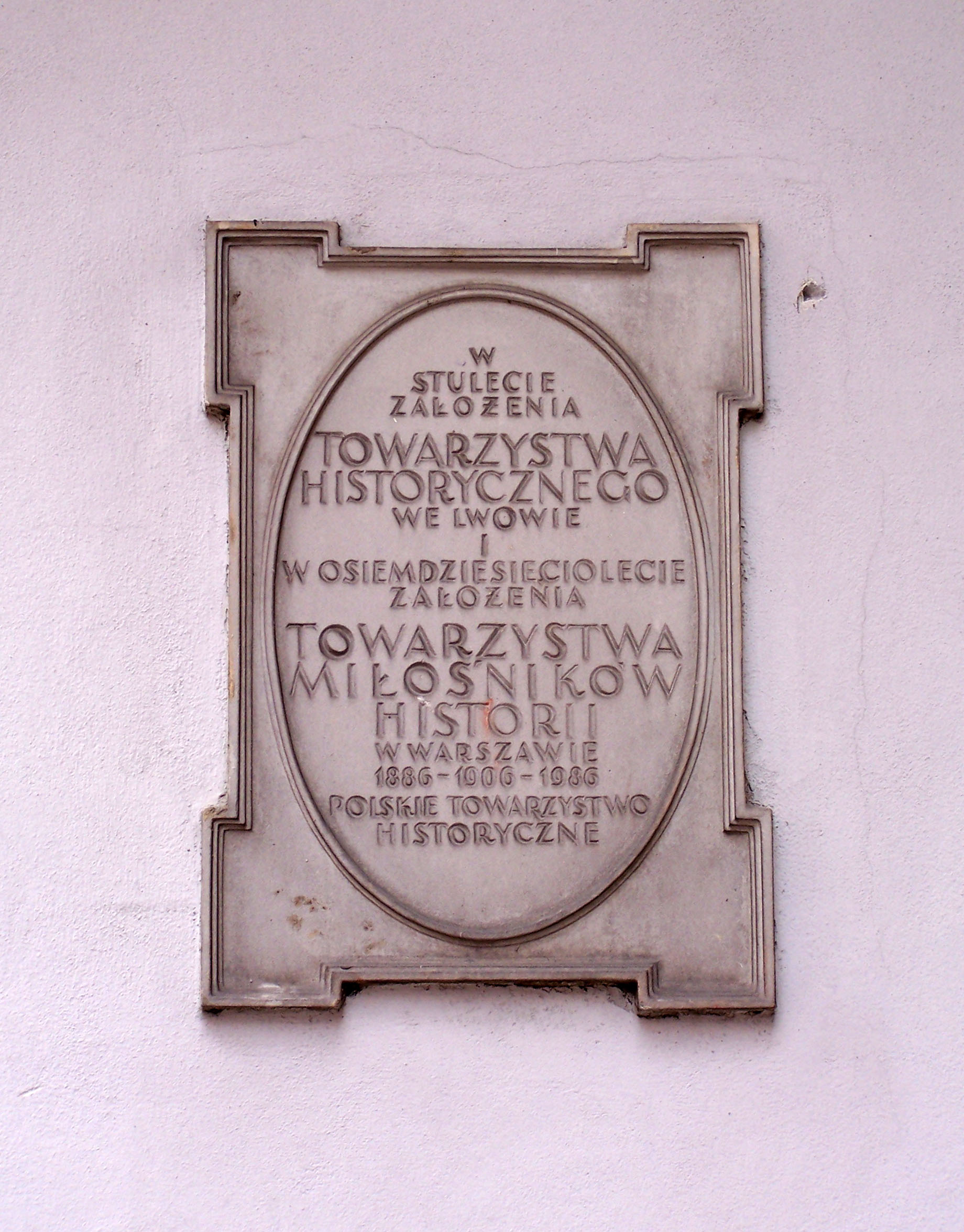
A memorial plaque to the Polish Historical Society, Warsaw

Polish Historical Society (Polish: Polskie Towarzystwo Historyczne, PTH) is a Polish professional scientific society for historians.

== History ==
Founded in 1886 in Lwów by Ksawery Liske as a local society, its scientific journal became the Kwartalnik Historyczny, which was first published in 1887. in 1924 it became a Poland-wide organization dedicated to advancing the knowledge and studies in history of Poland. In 1939, PTH had 12 branches: Brest, Grodno, Katowice, Kielce, Kraków, Lublin, Lvov, Łódź, Poznań, Przemyśl, Warsaw, and Vilnius. After World War II, the society was moved to Kraków on January 8, 1947, and to Warsaw on September 28 of that year.

Historians living in exile in the west formed the Polish Historical Society in Great Britain on November 29, 1946, which was transformed into the Polish Historical Society in Exile in 1953. Its first long-term president was Marian Kukiel.

In 1952 PTH had 14 branches: Białystok, Gdańsk, Katowice, Kielce, Kraków, Lublin, Łódź, Olsztyn, Poznań, Przemyśl, Toruń, Szczecin, Warsaw, and Wrocław. The number grew to 36 in 1958. Since 1974 it has been organizing tournaments of historical knowledge and since 1980 has been organizing academic conferences at five-year intervals. It has 46 local chapters, eight committees, and over 3,000 members. Since 2005, it has had a status of a public benefit organization under Polish law.

The Polish Historical Society publishes several scientific journals such as Małopolskie Studia Historyczne, Rocznik Kaliski, Rocznik Łódzki, Rocznik Lubelski and Biuletyn Polskiego Towarzystwa Historycznego.

== Presidents of the Polish Historical Society ==
- Ksawery Liske (1886–1891)
- Tadeusz Wojciechowski (1891–1914)
- Ludwik Finkel (1914–1923)
- Stanisław Zakrzewski (1923–1932 and 1934–1936)
- Franciszek Bujak (1932–1934 and 1936–1937)
- Ludwik Kolankowski (1937–1947)
- Władysław Konopczyński (1947)
- Jan Dąbrowski (1947–1950)
- Tadeusz Manteuffel (1950–1953)
- Natalia Gąsiorowska (1953–1956)
- Stanisław Herbst (1956–1973)
- Marian Biskup (1973–1978)
- Henryk Samsonowicz (1978–1982)
- Andrzej Zahorski (1982–1988)
- Andrzej Ajnenkiel (1988–1991)
- Jacek Staszewski (1991–1997)
- Wojciech Wrzesiński (1997–2003)
- Krzysztof Mikulski (2003–2013)
- Jan Szymczak (2013–2015)
- Krzysztof Mikulski (2015–)

== General Congresses of Polish Historians ==
Since 1800, the Society has organized General Conventions of Polish Historians. They are held, on average, every 5 years and are aimed at presenting and summarizing the achievements of Polish historical sciences, as well as setting goals for the future. The XXI Congress is scheduled for 2024 in Białystok.

- I: 1880 Academy of Learning, Kraków
- II: 17–19 July 1890, Lviv
- III: 4–6 June 1900, Kraków
- IV: 6–8 December 1925, Poznań
- V: 28 November – 4 December 1930, Warsaw
- VI: 17–20 September 1935, Vilnius
- VII: 19–22 September 1948, Wrocław
- VIII: 14–17 September 1958, Kraków
- IX: 13–15 September 1963, Warsaw
- X: 9–13 September 1969, Lublin
- XI: 9–12 September 1974, Toruń
- XII: 17–20 September 1979, Katowice
- XIII: 6–9 September 1984, Poznań
- XIV: 7–10 September 1989, Łódź
- XV: 19–21 September 1994, Gdańsk
- XVI: 15–19 September 1999, Wrocław
- XVII: 15–18 September 2004, Kraków
- XVIII: 16–19 September 2009, Olsztyn
- XIX: 17–21 September 2014, Szczecin
- XX: 18–20 September 2019, Lublin

== See also ==
- History of Poland
- Timeline of Polish history
