= Adam Szelągowski =

Polish historian (1873–1961)

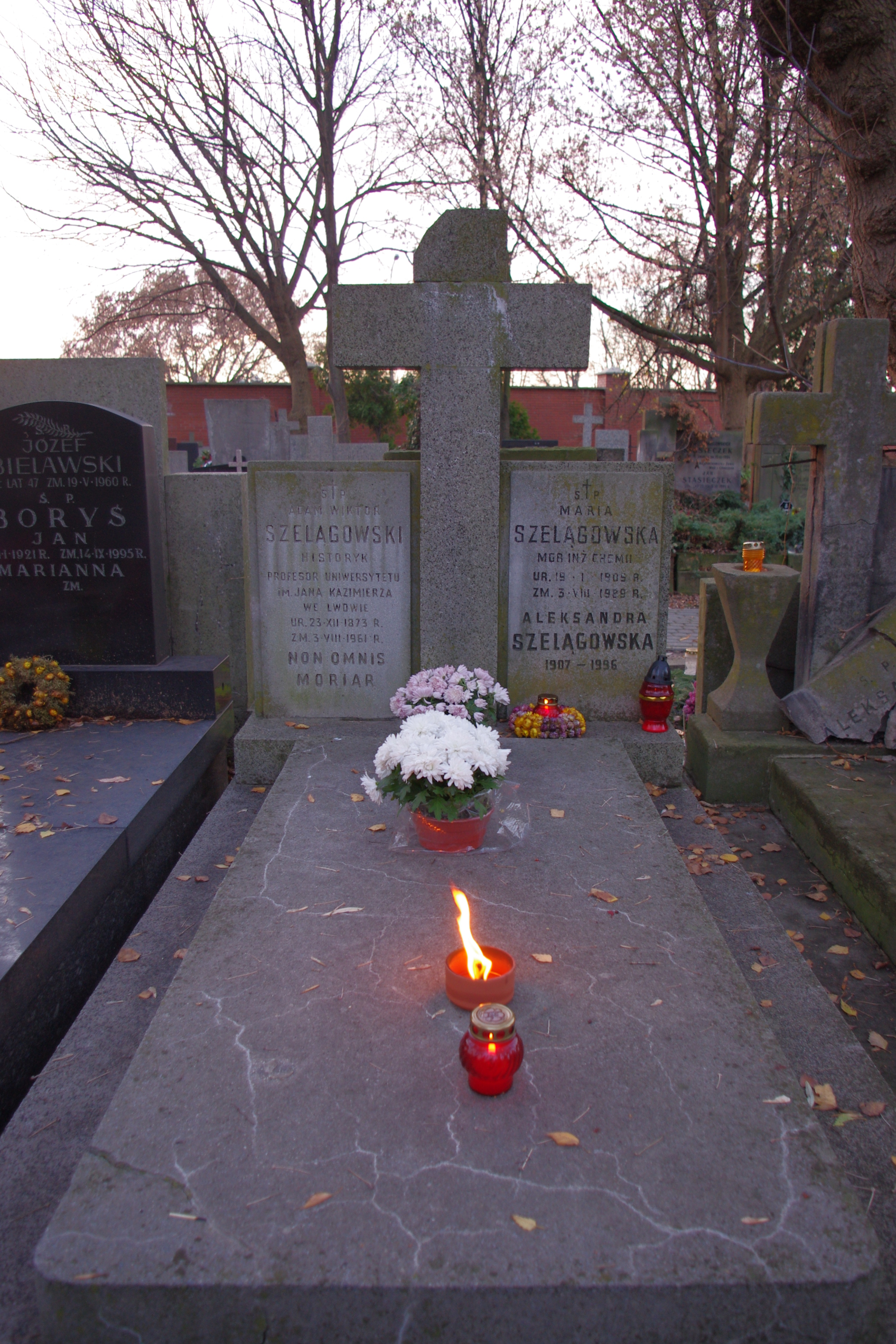
Grave of Adam Szelągowski at Powązki Cemetery in Warsaw

Adam Wiktor Szelągowski (23 December 1873 in Lublin – 3 August 1961 in Warsaw) was a Polish historian, teacher and professor of the Jan Kazimierz University.

Szelągowski was a member of the National League.

== Works ==
- Najstarsze drogi z Polski na Wschód: w okresie bizantyńsko-arabskim, Kraków 1909.
- Dzieje powszechne i cywilizacyi. Vol. I. Egipt. Babilon i Assyrya. Syrya i Palestyna. Azya Mniejsza. Iran i Turan. Indye, Chiny i Pacyfik. Warszawa 1913.
- Dzieje powszechne i cywilizacyi. Vol. II. Grecya archaiczna. Grecya bohaterska. Grecya wolna. Panowanie Grecyi nad światem. Warszawa 1914.
- Dzieje powszechne i cywilizacyi. Vol. III. Rzym – miasto. Rzym – państwo. Impreyalizm rzymski. Cezaryzm. Warszawa 1914.
- Dzieje powszechne i cywilizacyi. Vol. IV. Odrodzenie Wschodu. Geneza społeczeństw na Zachodzie. Świat Turko-słowiański. Warszawa 1918.
- Walka o Bałtyk. Sprawa północna w XVI i XVII. Part I. Lwów 1904.
- Śląsk i Polska wobec powstania czeskiego. Sprawa północna. Part II. Lwów 1904.
- O ujście Wisły. Wielka wojna pruska. Sprawa północna. Part III. Warszawa 1905.
- Chłopi-dziedzice we wsiach na prawie polskiem do końca XII w. (Studya nad historyą prawa polskiego, ed. O. Balzer, Vol. I). Lwów 1899.
- Kwestya ruska w świetle historyi. Part I. Historyczne prawo polskie na Rusi. Part II. Historyczne podstawy kwestyi ruskiej na ziemiach polskich. Warszawa 1911.
- Wici i Topory. Studyum nad genezą i znaczeniem godeł polskich i zawołań. Kraków 1914.
- O socyologicznym traktowaniu dziejów. Lwów 1898.
- Paweł Piasecki, historyk polski XVII w. Part I. Życiorys i charakterystyka ogólna pisarza. Lwów 1899.
- Wschód i Zachód. Zagadnienia z dziejów cywilizacyi. Lwów 1912.
- Pieniądz i przewrót cen w Polsce w XVI i XVII ww. Lwów 1902.
- Rozwój ekonomiczny i społeczny w Polsce do r. 1907 (Polska, Obrazy opisy). Macierz Polska. Lwów 1907.
- Z dziejów współzawodnictwa Anglii i Niemiec, Rosyi i Polski. Lwów 1910.
- The eastland company in Prussia. (The royal historical transactions). Cambridge University Press 1912.
- Układy królewicza Władysława i dysydentów z Gustawem Adolfem. Lwów 1900.
- Rozkład Rzeszy i Polska za Władysława IV. Kraków 1907.
- Sprawa reformy elekcyi za panowania Zygmunta III. Lwów 1912.

== Bibliography ==
- Maternicki, Jerzy (2011). "Adam Szelągowski". Polski Słownik Biograficzny. Vol. 47. Polska Akademia Nauk & Polska Akademia Umiejętności. pp. 616–619.
