= Maria Polaczkówna =

Polish-Ukrainian historian, archivist, war resistor (1878–1944)

- Born: 28 August 1878; Lwów. Austria-Hungary (present-day, Lviv, Ukraine)
- Died: 12 August 1944 (aged 65); Zieleniak camp, Warsaw, General Government
- Occupations: Historian; Geographer; archivist
- Employer: State Archives in Przemyśl
- Relatives: Helena Polaczkówna

Maria Polaczkówna (1878–1944) was a Polish historian, geographer, archivist and member of the Polish resistance. Polaczkówna died at Zieleniak camp during the Warsaw Uprising.

== Biography ==
Maria Polaczkówna was born on 28 August 1878 in Lwów. Austria-Hungary (present-day, Lviv, Ukraine) to Adam Polaczek and Anna Polaczek (née Szustow). Polaczkówna's father took part in the Polish revolt called the January Uprising and spent years an exile in France where he completed medical studies. In his absence, his family lived a very modest life. Polaczkówna and her younger sister Helena Polaczkówna, took on tutoring assignments to earn enough money to afford their education. Despite their modest beginnings, the sisters rose through the academic ranks with each earning a PhD.

Polaczkówna earned her doctorate in history. During the years before World War I, and then again in the 1920s, she worked with Eugeniusz Romer (Geographical Institute of L'viv University).

According to archives in Poland, Polaczkówna was the first archivist to work with the city records in Przemyśl, Poland, when she began in 1917. After some years in Przemyśl, she returned to L'viv, where she taught history and geography at local schools until she retired in 1938. She was the author or co-author of geography textbooks and of a valuable monograph Wahania klimatyczne w Polsce w wiekach średnich (Climatic Fluctuations in Medieval Poland); L'viv, 1925.

== Capture ==
During World War II, Polaczkówna and her younger sister Helena Polaczkówna lived together in L'viv (now in Ukraine) at 29 Listopada Street (now Jevhena Konovaltsya Street). During the German occupation, they became involved in educational, charitable and conspiratorial activities. The apartment shared by sisters became a contact point for secret couriers and messengers of the Information and Propaganda Bureau of Home Army Headquarters, a system of asylum and safe places where illegal publications could be edited. Reportedly, it was through the carelessness of some co-workers that the Gestapo identified the building and arrested Helena on 27 April 1942. She was tortured and finally murdered in Autumn 1942.

After Helena's arrest, Maria left L'viv for Warsaw. After participating in the Warsaw Uprising, on 5 August 1944, Maria was arrested on the street and jailed in a basement on Filtrowej Street. She was last seen alive on 12 August, weak and exhausted.

== Selected works ==
- Polaczkówna, Maria. Atlasy krajoznawcze: przewodnik metodyczny: [województwo warszawskie]. (Sightseeing atlases: a methodical guide: [Warsaw province].)
- Polaczkówna, Maria. Wahania klimatyczne w Polsce w wiekach średnich (Climatic Fluctuations in Medieval Poland); L'viv, 1925.
