= Tadeusz Wojciechowski =

Polish historian and university rector (1838–1919)

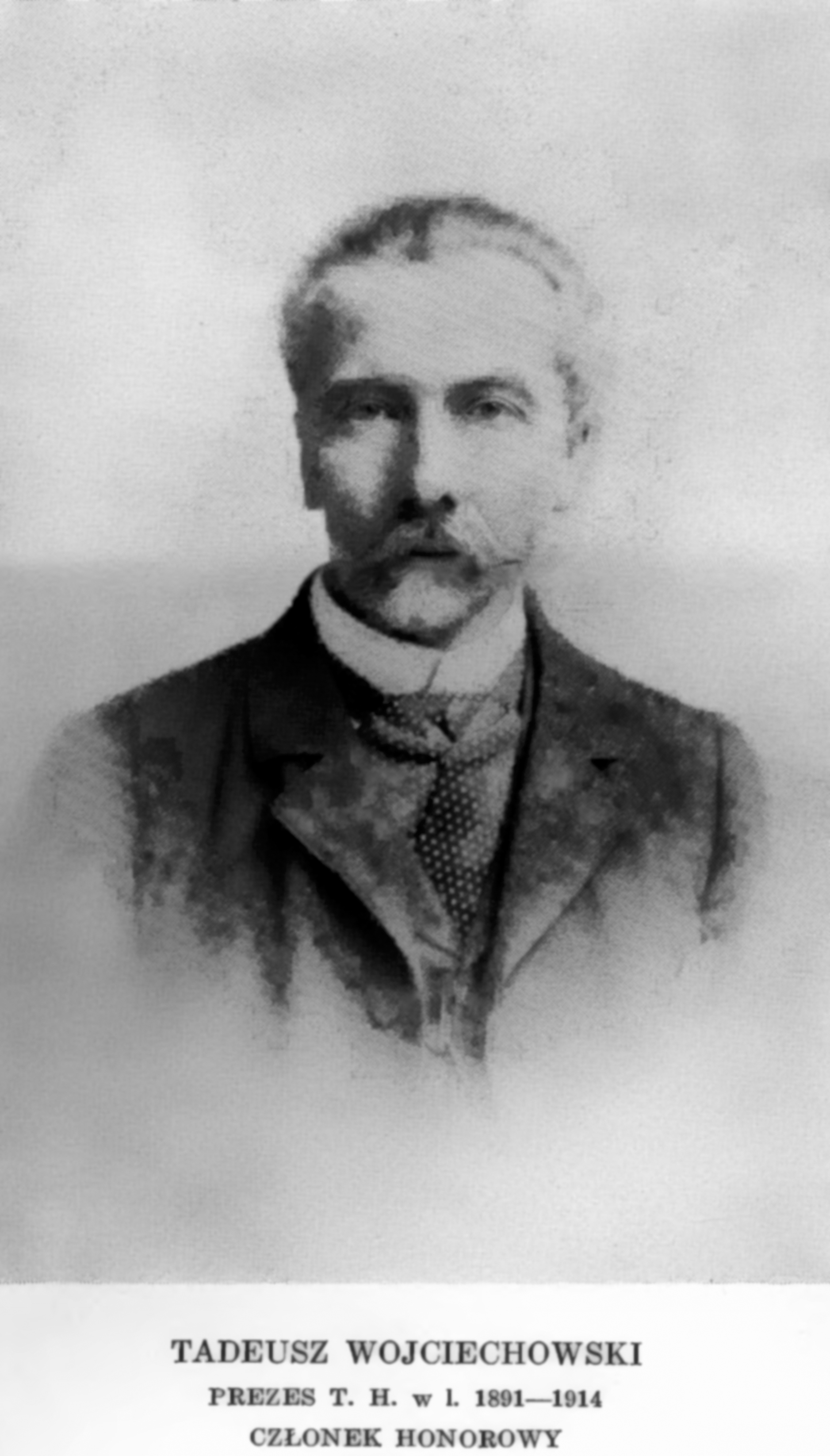
Tadeusz Wojciechowski

Tadeusz Wojciechowski (b. 13 June 1838 in Kraków, d. 21 November 1919 in Lwów) was a Polish historian, professor, and rector of the University of Lwów (now Lviv, Ukraine; then in the Austro-Hungary). One of the founders of the Polish Historical Society and a member of the Academy of Learning. Medievalist. Deputy to the Austrian Herrenhaus. Buried at the Lychakivskiy Cemetery.

== Works ==
- Chrobacja, rozbiór starożytności słowiańskich (Kraków 1873).
- O Rocznikach polskich X-XV wieku (1880).
- O Kazimierzu Mnichu (1881).
- O życiu i pismach Wincentego z Kielc (1881).
- Co to jest historia i po co się jej uczymy (1883).
- Podział i zakres dziejów polskich (1884).
- O powtórnej elekcji Stanisława Leszczyńskiego w r. 1733 (Charakterystyka rządów Augusta II) (1887).
- Co Al Bekri opowiadał o Słowianach i ich sąsiadach (1887).
- Bonifatius der Apostel der Deutschen und die Slaven-apostel Konstantinus (Cyrillus) und Methodius (1888),
- O Piaście i piaście (1895).
- Kościół katedralny w Krakowie (1899).
- Eremici reguły św. Romualda, czyli benedyktyni włoscy w Polsce XI wieku (1902).
- Najdawniejszy znany obecnie polski akt książęcy z r. 1081-1086 (1902).
- Szkice historyczne XI wieku (1904).
- Plemię Kadłubka (1909).
