= Natalia Gąsiorowska =

Polish historian (1881–1964)

- Born: 20 May 1881; Orzyc
- Died: 30 November 1964
- Occupation: Historian

Academic background
- Doctoral advisor: Szymon Askenazy

Natalia Gąsiorowska-Grabowska (20 May 1881 – 30 November 1964) was a historian, president of the Polish Historical Society from 1953 until 1956.

== Biography ==
She came from empoverished gentry family. She was the daughter of Józef Gąsiorowski (1840–1886) and Weronika née Trawińska (1850–1932). Her siblings were: Zofia, Kazimiera, Wanda, Eugenia, Stanisław and Franciszek Gąsiorowski.

She grew up in difficult material conditions, earning money by giving lessons and working in secret educational clubs. She graduated from Henryka Czarnocka's boarding school in Warsaw, where her teachers included Bronisław Chlebowski and Ludwik Straszewicz. She graduated from high school on Wilcza Street, where she obtained a certificate entitling her to homeschooling. Due to the boycott of government secondary schools in the former Kingdom of Poland, she passed her secondary school leaving examination externally in Riga.

She studied history in Heidelberg (1903–1904); history and economics at the École de Droit, Collège de France in Paris (1904–1905), where she attended lectures of Paul Aulard, André Gide and Charles Seignobos; and history in Zurich, Hamburg and Lviv (1905–1910). She obtained doctorate in 1910 from the Lviv University upon dissertation Wolność druku w Królestwie Kongresowym 1815–1830 supervised by Szymon Askenazy.

Since the 1920s, she taught at the Free Polish University. She obtained habilitation from the University of Warsaw in 1934. From 1945, she was a professor at the University of Warsaw. In 1950, she joined Polish United Workers' Party. She supervised more than twenty doctoral dissertations.

== Works ==
- Ruch socjalistyczny i zawodowy wśród kobiet. Prawo wyborcze kobiet. 1907.
- Zarys dziejów Wielkiej Rewolucji Francuskiej. Przyczyny powstania rewolucji, przebieg jej i skutki. 1907.
- Przesądy antysemickie w świetle cyfr i faktów. 1909.
- Historia zakonów w Polsce. 1910.
- Książę Józef. 1914.
- Wolność druku w Królestwie Kongresowem 1815–1830. 1916.
- Historia Polski w nauczaniu analfabetów dorosłych. 1916.
- Historia Polski porozbiorowej dla nauczycieli szkół początkowych. 1917.
- Wiosna Ludów roku 1848. 1917.
- Historia powszechna ze szczególnym uwzględnieniem historii Polski. 1920.
- Polska na przełomie życia gospodarczego (1764–1830). 1921.
- Górnictwo i hutnictwo w Królestwie Polskiem 1815–1830. 1922.
- Historja Bułgarji w zarysie. 1923.
- Historia społeczno-gospodarcza Polski. 1932.
- Górnictwo i hutnictwo w Polsce. 1937. Second edition: 1949.
- Kapitalizm w rozwoju dziejowym. 1946.
- Położenie i walka ekonomiczna i polityczna górników z okupantem niemieckim w Królestwie Polskim w czasie I wojny imperialistycznej. 1952.
- Proces kształtowania się klasy robotniczej na ziemiach polskich. 1955.
- Okręg łódzki w rewolucji 1905–07. 1956.
- Górnicy i hutnicy w Królestwie Polskim 1864–1866. 1957.
- Z dziejów przemysłu w Królestwie Polskim 1815–1918. 1965.

=== Editions ===
- W stulecie Wiosny Ludów. 1948–1953. Five volumes.
- Dokumenty i materiały do historii stosunków polsko-radzieckich (1917–1960). Editor of the first six folumes (1962–1967).

=== Articles and book chapters ===
- "Polityka gospodarcza Robespierra". Przegląd Współczesny. 50 (147–148): 103–127. 1934. Archived from the original on 7 October 2024.
- Kosztulska, Maria (1961). "Życie i działalność Marii Koszutskiej". Pisma i przemówienia.

== Accolades ==
- Order of the Banner of Labour, 1st class (1949)
- Gold Cross of Merit (1951)
- Commander's Cross with Star of the Order of Polonia Restituta (1955)
- Honorary doctor of the University of Łódź (1961)

== Bibliography ==
- Kasprzakowa, J. (1965). "Natalia Gąsiorowska–Grabowska (1881–1964)". Z Pola Walki. 8 (2): 133–142.
- Kormanowa, Żanna (1976). "Profesor Natalia Gąsiorowska". Dzieje Najnowsze. 8 (3): 3–13.
- Kula, Witold (1964). "Natalia Gąsiorowska (20 V 1881 – 30 XI 1964)". Kwartalnik Historyczny. 71 (2): 522–527.
