= Ksawery Liske =

Polish historian (1838–1891)

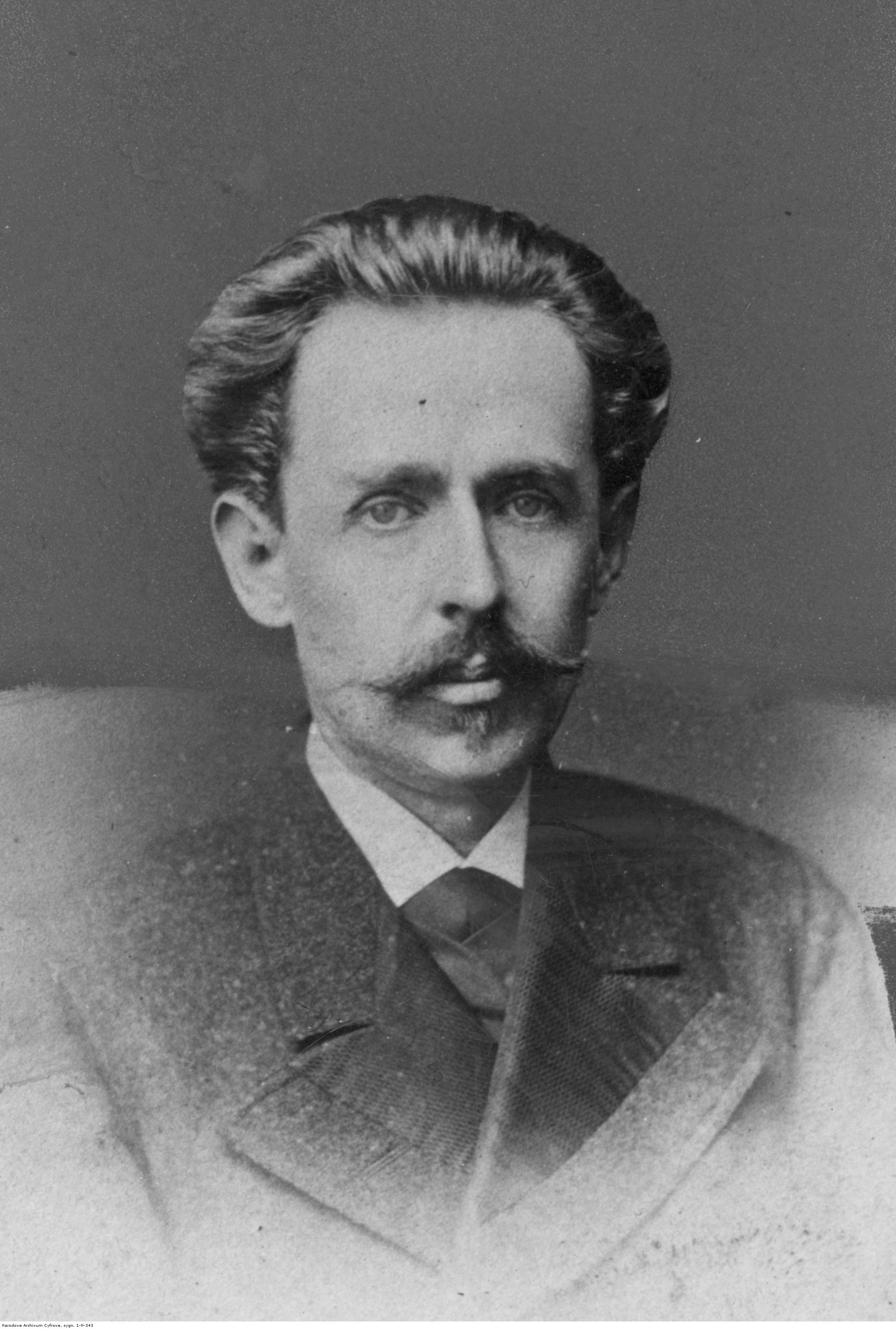
Franciszek Ksawery Liske

Franciszek Ksawery Liske (18 October 1838 in Śląskowo – 27 February 1891 in Lwów) was a Polish historian, a founder of the Lwów's historical school (lwowska szkoła historyczna), a founder and first chairman of the Polish Historical Society (Polskie Towarzystwo Historyczne), director of the Archiwum Krajowe Aktów Grodzkich i Ziemskich we Lwowie. In 1879-1880 he was Rector of the Lviv University.

He was buried in the Łyczakowski Cemetery.

His students were Oswald Balzer, Wiktor Czermak, Ludwik Finkel, Stanisław Lukas, Saturnin Kwiatkowski, Antoni Prochaska, Adam Szelągowski.

== Publications ==
- Marcin Kromer, biskup warmiński — dziejopis wieku XVI. Poznań 1869;
- Bolesław Chrobry i Otto III w Gnieźnie. Lwów 1869;
- Austria wobec trzeciego rozbioru Polski. Lwów 1870;
- Szczerbiec i złote wrota kijowskie. Kraków 1869;
- Konstytucja 3 maja i mocarstwa niemieckie. Lwów 1873;
- Cudzoziemcy w Polsce. Lwów 1876;
- Elekcja w Rzeszy r. 1519. Warszawa 1876;
- Filip Auril i jego pobyt w Polsce. Warszawa 1877

== Bibliography ==
- Antoni Gąsiorowski, Jerzy Topolski [red.]: Wielkopolski Słownik Biograficzny. Warszawa-Poznań: Państwowe Wydawnictwo Naukowe, 1981, p. 426-427. ISBN 83-01-02722-3.
