= Askenazy school =

Informal group of Polish historians

The Askenazy school (Polish: Szkoła Askenazego, sometimes referred to as Lwów–Warsaw School of History, Lwowsko-warszawska szkoła historyczna) was an informal group of Polish historians formed in the early 20th century under the influence of Szymon Askenazy in the University of Lwów and Warsaw University.

In the 19th century, most history studies in Poland were focused mainly on the Middle Ages and the Renaissance. The dominant trend among most conservative historians was to argue that the modern history of Poland was nothing but a history of ill-fated uprisings; the history was thus ignored in their studies.

The Askenazy school was the first to underline the importance of recent history in the creation of the modern nation in Poland. It also focused on the history of international diplomatic relations and economic development of Poland.

The historians grouped in this movement were the first to lay foundations for the modern study of the history of the Duchy of Warsaw and Congress Poland.
