= Emma de Sigaldi =

Monégasque sculptor and artist (1910-2010)

Emma de Sigaldi, née Emma Lackner (22 December 1910, Karlsruhe – 23 October 2010, Monaco) was a German-Monegasque ballet dancer and sculptor.

== Life ==
Emma Lackner was born on 22 December 1910 in Karlsruhe. As a girl she received classical dance training from Olga Mertens-Leger, Eugenie Eduardova and Tatjana Gsovsky. Later she was also taught expressive dance by Mary Wigman and continued to pursue both directions.

During the World War II Lackner escaped from the bombing raids first to Berlin and from there to her brother in Baden-Baden. There she met Monegasque Count Felix de Sigaldi, whom she married in 1954 and followed him to Monaco. Since that time she lived in Monaco.

Emma de Sigaldi died on 23 October 2010 at the age of 99 in Monaco.

== Dancing career ==
At the age of 15 Lackner was hired by the Munich ballet master Heinrich Kröller. In the 1920s and 1930s she appeared as a senior dancer at the Munich National Theater and as solo dancer at the Baden State Theater in Karlsruhe and at the Königsberg Theater. In 1939 Lackner won the bronze medal at Bartok's music at the International Dance Congress in Brussels with her solo performance as “Dancing Woman” in a Breughel mask.

During the World War II she was employed as the first solo dancer and deputy dance master at the theater in Saarbrücken until 1944. From the end of the war she only appeared in solo touring and was very successful as critics celebrated her as the second Isadora Duncan and the successor to Mary Wigman.

== Sculptor career ==
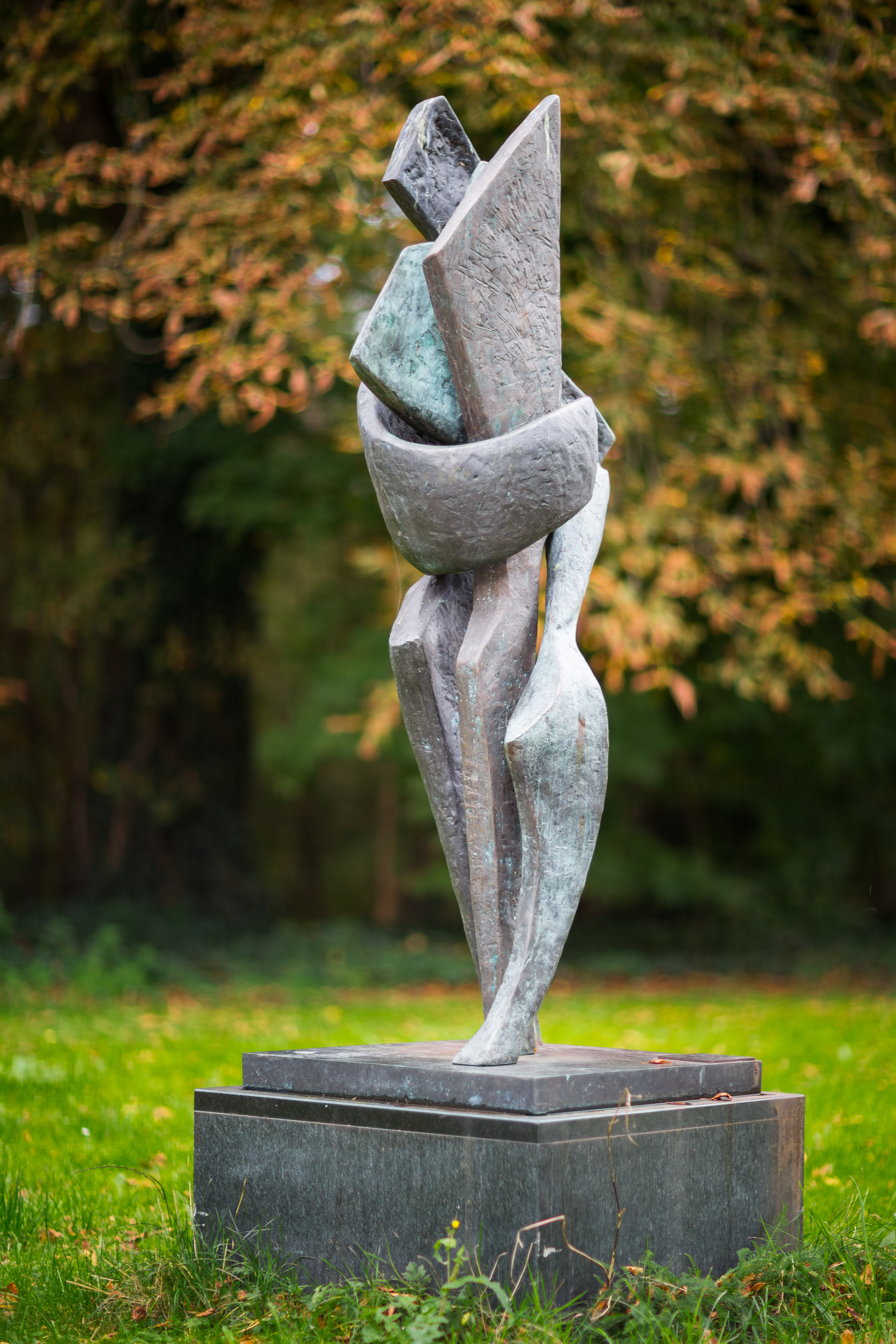
Sculpture Transformations by Emma de Sigaldi, Hanover, Germany

After getting married and moving to Monaco Lackner ended her dance career started working as a sculptor under the name Emma de Sigaldi. Her first exhibition was shown in 1960. She received numerous awards on followed international exhibitions in Paris, São Paulo, Seville, Hong Kong, Milan, Rome, Florence, Chiba and Osaka, Berlin, Prague and St. Petersburg. In the United States her works were exhibited in New York and in Cincinnati, Ohio.

De Sigaldi also became popular in Monte Carlo and made series of works for the city such as "Diver" of the basin and "Life Pillar" of the place of the mills. Some of her works can be found among sculptures in the Fontveille park in Monaco. De Sigaldi’s “Le Prongeur” sculpture can be seen at the Port of Monaco. Her another sculpture “Evolution” was depicted on a post stamp.

De Sigaldi presented her bronze sculpture “Possession” (1995) to her hometown Karlsruhe that was unveiled in 1998 by the Mayor of Karlsruhe, Gerhard Seiler, at its location near the concert hall. On the occasion of de Sigaldi’s 90th birthday in 2010 an exhibition of her works was organized in the foyer of Baden State Theater in Karlsruhe. At the age of 97 de Sigaldi still came to St. Peterburg for the opening of her exhibition.

In her work, de Sigaldi was influenced by various art movements seeing sculpture similar to dance as another form communication with the space. Marble and bronze materials dominate in all her series of works from miniatures to monumental works.

De Sigaldi work has been offered at auction multiple times. Her artwork “The Roc” was sold for $1,062 USD at the Doyle New York in 2018.

A biographical film about Emma de Sigaldi was produced by Pierre Remy in 2000.

== Bibliography ==
- Emma De Sigaldi. - ISBN 9788888182087 - MARETTI EDITORE 2002
