= Ludwik Finkel =

Polish historian

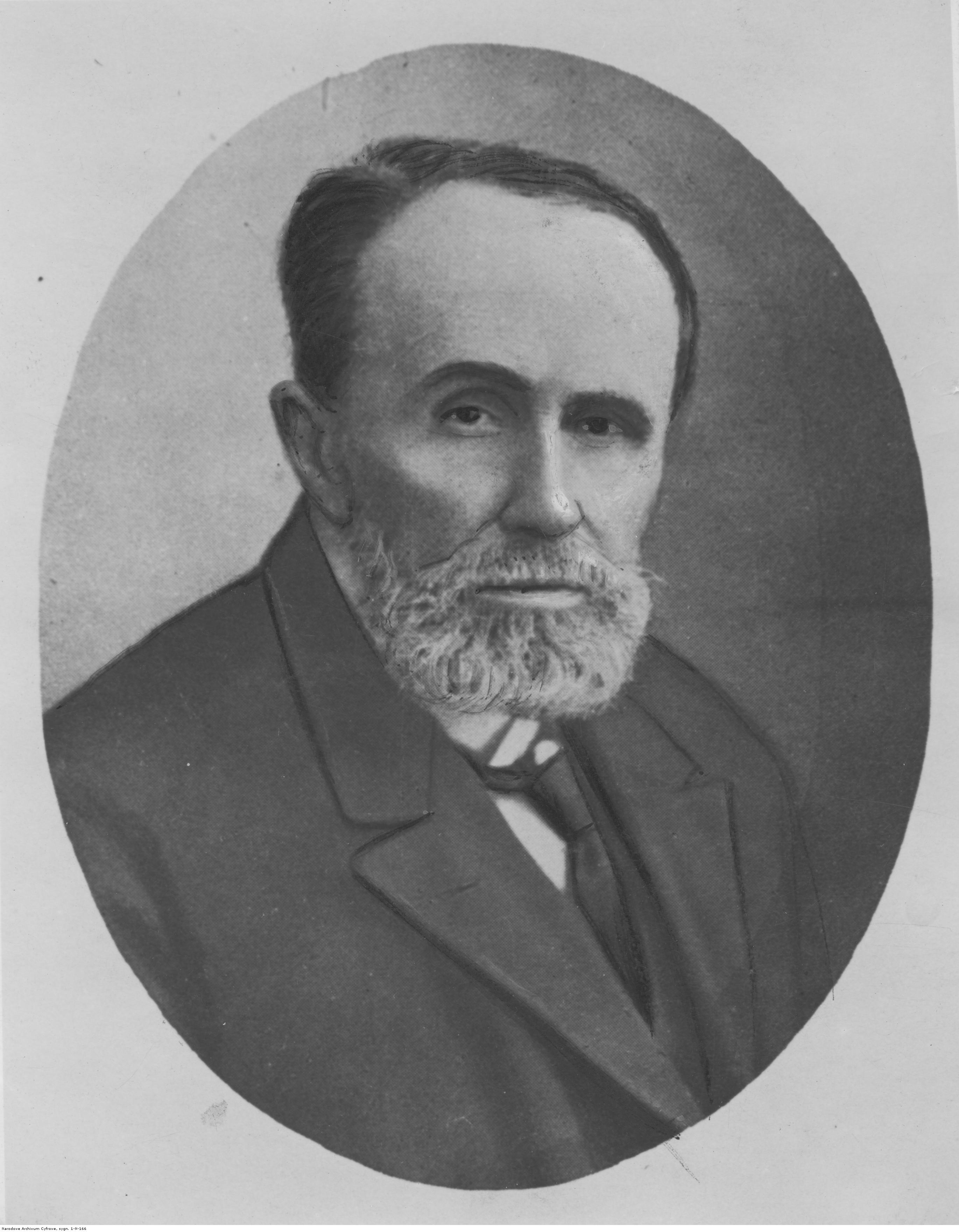
Ludwik Finkel

Ludwik Michał Emanuel Finkel (20 March 1858, in Bursztyn – 24 October 1930, in Lwów) was a Polish historian, and rector of the Lviv University.

From 1878 to 1881 he studied history, philosophy and history of literature at the Lwów University under the tutelage Aleksander Hirschberg, Julian Ochorowicz and Roman Pilat. His master was Ksawery Liske. Good friend of Finkel was Stanisław Lukas. In 1882 he gained a PhD. Topic of his thesis was Marcin Kromer, historyk polski XVI wieku (Marcin Kromer, a Polish historian of 16th century).

Among his students were Natalia Gąsiorowska, Kazimierz Hartleb, Stanisław Kot, Henryk Mościcki.

Ludwik Finkel was buried in the Łyczakowski Cemetery.

== Selected publications ==
- Poselstwa Jana Dantyszka (1879)
- Marcin Kromer historyk polski XVI w. Rozbiór krytyczny (1883)
- Elekcja Leszczyńskiego w roku 1704 (1884)
- Okopy św. Trójcy (1889)
- Napad Tatarów na Lwów w roku 1695 (1890)
- Bibliografia historii polskiej (1891, 1895, 1906, 3 Volumes) (co-author Stanisław Starzyński)
- Konstytucja 3 Maja (1891)
- Miasto Tarnopol w roku 1672 (1892)
- Księstwo warszawskie (1893)
- O pieśni Legionów (1894), wyd. 2 pt. Pieśń Legionów (1910) (illustrated by Juliusz Kossak)
- Historya Uniwersytetu Lwowskiego (1894, 2 Volumes with prof. Stanisław Starzyński)
- O tzw. metodzie regressywnej w nauczaniu historyi (1894)
- Elekcja Zygmunta I. Sprawy dynastyi Jagiellońskiej i Unii Polsko-Litewskiej (1910)
- Króla Jana Kazimierza dyplom erekcyjny Uniwersytetu Lwowskiego z r. 1661 (z 3 tablicami podobizn dyplomu) tekst oryginalny z tłumaczeniem i komentarzem (1912)
- O sprawie udziału lenników w elekcjach jagiellońskich (1913)
- Karol Szajnocha bibliotekarzem : Zakładowi Narodowemu imienia Ossolińskich w stulecie pracy i zasług (1928)
- Pojęcie, zakres i zadania dziejów powszechnych (1931)
