= Western Galician Conservators Circle =

- Formation: 1889
- Dissolved: 1923
- Location: Kraków, Poland
- Coordinates: 50°03′41″N 19°56′18″E

The Western Galician Conservators Circle was a monument protection organization that was engaged in the protection, preservation, and restoration of monuments in Western Galicia. It existed in Kraków from 1889 to 1923.

== History ==
In 1850, the Archaeological Committee of the Krakow Scientific Society was founded, which restored the destroyed monuments after the great Kraków fire. In the same year, the Central Commission for the Study and Preservation of Historic Buildings was established in Vienna to protect the monuments of the Austrian Empire, which included Galicia. In 1873, the Central Commission was reorganized into the Central Commission for the Study and Conservation of Historical and Artistic Monuments, which was divided into three sections: archaeological, architectural and artistic monuments, and archival monuments.

On 24–25 May 1888, the First Congress of Conservators of Galicia took place in the building of the National Museum in Kraków. During the meeting, a decision was made to establish organizations in Eastern and Western Galicia to assist and coordinate conservators and correspondents regarding the funds annually allocated by the Diet of Galicia and Lodomeria for the maintenance and restoration of monuments. Their executive bodies (committees) were located in Lviv and Kraków. The congress also adopted a resolution to begin an inventory of historical monuments and to draw up a map of conservative districts.

On 17 December 1889, in Kraków, Western Galician conservatives and correspondents founded the "Western Galician Conservators Circle". In 1911, in accordance with the reforms in Galicia, the position of the only state conservator was established, which turned the Lviv "Circle" into a society of antiquity lovers. In 1916, the West Galician conservatives at a meeting decided to reorganize their organization into the "Western Galician Conservators Regional Circle". In 1923, the organization ceased to exist as its functions were fully integrated into the new state monument protection system.

In 1898 and 1904, two volumes of the Teka Konserwatorska were published.

In different years, the organization was run by: Włodzimierz Demetrykiewicz, Stanisław Krzyżanowski, Sławomir Odrzywolski, Zygmunt Hendel, Adolf Szyszko-Bohusz, Eustachy Stanisław Sanguszko, and others.

== Directors ==
- Józef Łepkowski (1889–1894)
- Marian Sokołowski (1894)
- Stanisław Tomkowicz

== Bibliography ==
- Dobosz P., Gaczoł A. 80-ta rocznica utworzenia Krajowego Urzędu Konserwatorskiego w Krakowie // Ochrona Zabytków. — vol. 47. — Art. no. 3-4 186–187. — 1994. — S. 323–346.
