= Pean (bishop of Poznań) =

Polish bishop

Pean was a Roman Catholic Bishop of Poznan, Poland in the twelfth century.

Little is known about his life, career, or episcopacy. He is mentioned as the Chancellor of Prince Mieszko the Old in a document dated 2 March 1145, written by papal legate Cardinal Humbalda to the Abbey of Trzemesznie, near Gniezno.

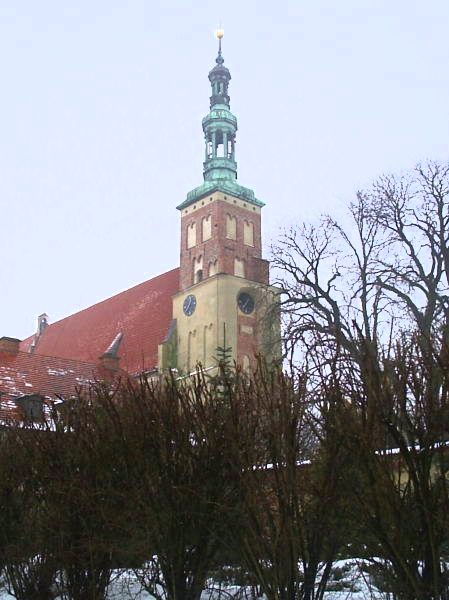
Abbey at Lubin

Pean served as the Bishop of Poznan from 1146 till 1152, from 1146 until 1152, as recorded in the Annales Lubinensis. He is also mentioned in the records of the Liber Lubinensis fraternity, which confirm his role as a benefactor of the Abbey of Lubin.

Pean died on 16 April 1152.

Religious titles
Preceded by Bogufał I	Bishop of Poznan; 1146–1152	Succeeded by Stefan
