= Max Lehmann (historian) =

German historian (1845–1929)

Max Lehmann (19 May 1845, in Berlin – 8 October 1929, in Göttingen) was a German historian.

== Career ==
He studied philology and history at the universities of Königsberg, Bonn and Berlin, receiving his doctorate at the latter institution in 1867. In 1879 Lehmann began to teach in the Berlin Military Academy, and in 1887 was made a member of the Prussian Academy. A year later, he succeeded Max Lenz at Marburg as a professor of history. In 1893 he was appointed to a similar position at the University of Leipzig, and later the same year, relocated to the University of Göttingen as a professor of medieval and modern history. Famed Polish historian Szymon Askenazy wrote his doctoral dissertation under Lehmann's supervision (1894).

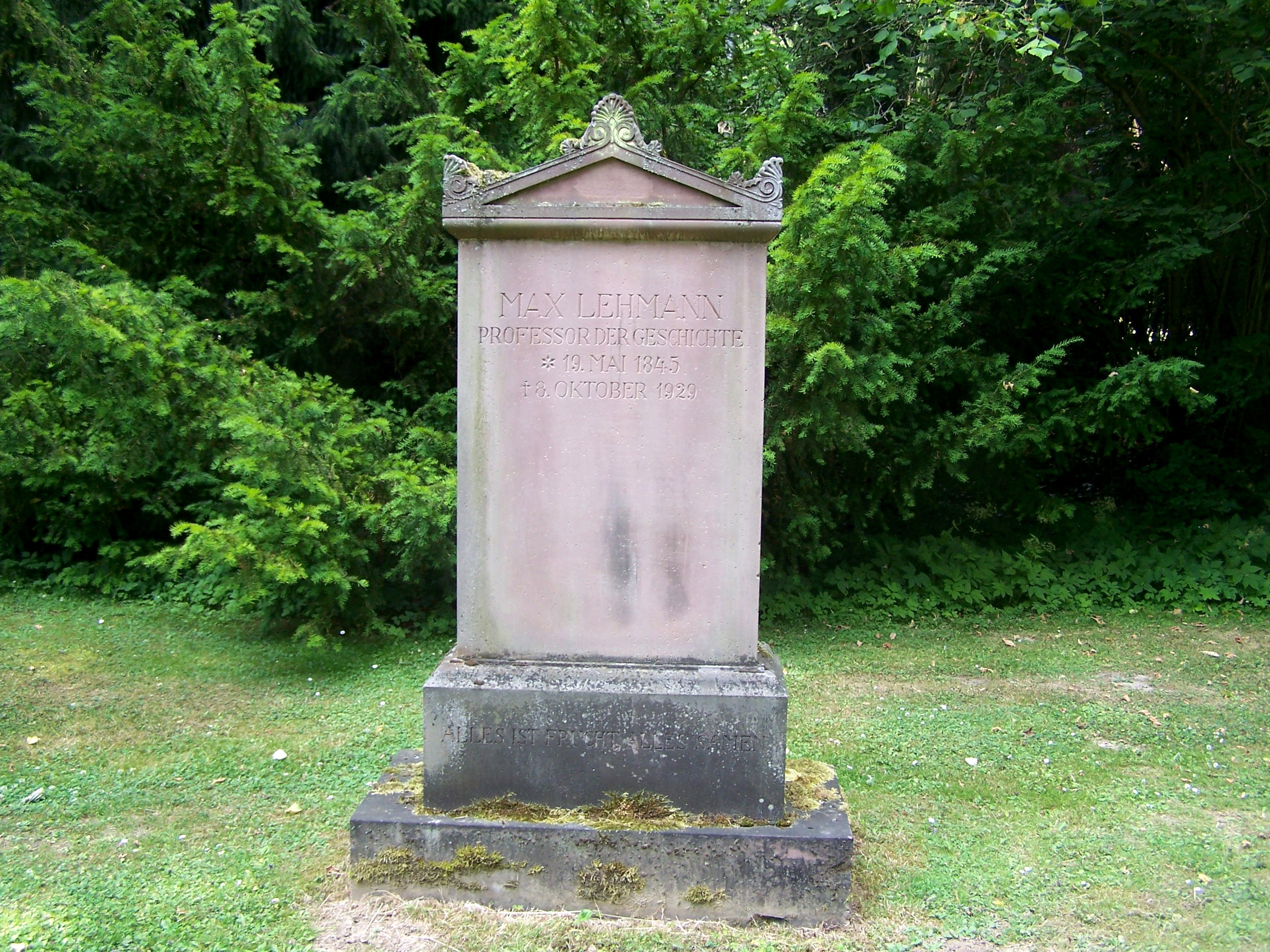
Gravesite of Lehmann at the Stadtfriedhof in Göttingen.

== Works ==
- Das Aufgebot zur Heerfahrt Ottos II nach Italien (1869) – Otto II's military expedition in Italy.
- Der Krieg von 1870 bis zur Einschliessung von Metz (1873) – The War of 1870 up to the encirclement of Metz.
- Knesebeck und Schon: Beiträge zur Geschichte der Freiheitskriege (1875) – Karl Friedrich von dem Knesebeck and Theodor von Schön; contributions to the history of the Freiheitskriege.
- Stein, Scharnhorst und Schön: eine Schutzschrift (1877) – Karl Freiherr vom und zum Stein, Gerhard Johann David von Scharnhorst and Theodor von Schön.
- Scharnhorst (1886–87), which won a prize.
- Friedrich der Grosse und der Ursprung des siebenjärigen Krieges (1894) – Frederick the Great and the origin of the Seven Years' War.
- Freiherr von Stein (1902–05), which won the Wedekind prize.
- Historische Aufsätze und Reden (1911) – Historical essays and lectures.
- Die Erhebung von 1813 (1913) – The uprising of 1813.
