= Lubinski =

Lubinski, femonone: Lubinska is a Polish toponymic surname literally meaning one from "Lubin". Notable people with the surname include:

- Christina Lubinski (born 1979), German historian
- David Lubinski, American psychologist
- Jorge Wagensberg Lubinski (1948–2018), Spanish professor, researcher and writer
- Kurt Lubinski (1899–1969), German-Dutch photojournalist
- Rudolf Lubinski (1873–1935), Croatian architect
- Sharon Lubinski, United States Marshal
- Wojciech Lubiński (born 1969), Polish military physician
