= Władysław Semkowicz =

Polish lawyer, historian, archivist and social activist

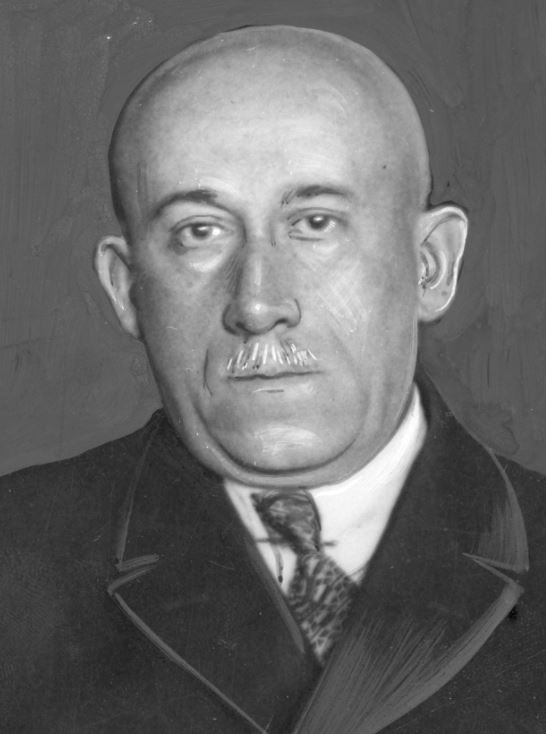
- Born: 8 May 1878
- Died: 19 February 1949 (aged 70)
- Education: Doctor of Law (1902)
- Occupations: lawyer, historian, archivist and social activist
- Known for: development of the Polish archival field
- Parents: Aleksander Semkowicz (father); Marie Schier (mother)

Władysław Semkowicz (8 May 1878 – 19 February 1949) was a Polish lawyer, historian, archivist and social activist. His work has been an important contribution to the development of the Polish archival field.

Władysław Semkowicz was born 8 May 1878 in Kraków, the oldest child of Aleksander Semkowicz and Marie Schier. In 1902 he became a doctor of law.

During World War I, at the beginning of 1915 in Vienna, he became chairman of the board of the Polish War Archive. In 1917 he reviewed the drafts of a new law and archival regulations prepared by the Archival Commission of the Temporary Council of State. His position was later used during work on the rescript of the Regency Council on archives. On 8 March 1925 he was elected president of the Polish Heraldry Society in Lviv. In the years 1924–1933 he was the editor of the Encyclopedia of Auxiliary Sciences of History, which had three editions before the outbreak of World War II: 1924, 1929, 1933.

During the occupation he was initially imprisoned as a result of the Sonderaktion Krakau in Sachsenhausen. After being released from the camp, he worked at the Institute for German Work in the East, according to some historians on the orders of the Home Army. The thesis of alleged voluntary collaboration with the Germans, put forward in the controversial doctoral dissertation of Anetta Rybicka Instytut Niemieckiej Pracy Wschodniej. Kraków 1940–1945, was met with criticism from the Kraków academic community.

Married twice: from 27 June 1903 to Lesława née Bursów (1890–1932), from 29 January 1936 to Jadwiga Cyga (1897–1983).

He was buried at the Rakowicki Cemetery in Kraków (section Ł-north-left of Tarnawski).

== Orders and decorations ==
- Commander's Cross of the Order of Polonia Restituta (27 November 1929)
- Gold Cross of Merit (twice: for the second time on 11 November 1936)
- Commander of the Order of Saint Sava (Kingdom of Serbia, 1930)
