= University of Lviv =

Public university in Lviv, Ukraine

Coordinates: 49°50′26″N 24°01′20″E

Ivan Franko National University of Lviv
- НЗВО «Львівський національний університет імені Івана Франка»
- Latin: Universitas Leopoliensis
- Former names: Uniwersytet Jana Kazimierza (John Casimir University); Universität Lemberg
- Motto: Patriae decori civibus educandis
- Motto in English: Educated citizens – glory of the Motherland
- Type: Public
- Established: 20 January 1661; 365 years ago
- Founders: King of Poland and Grand Duke of Lithuania; John II Casimir Vasa
- Affiliations: Ministry of Education and Science of Ukraine
- President: Roman Hladyshevskyi
- Students: 11,649
- Location: Lviv, Ukraine
- Specialty programs: 111
- Colors: Blue and gold
- Website: https://www.lnu.edu.ua/en/
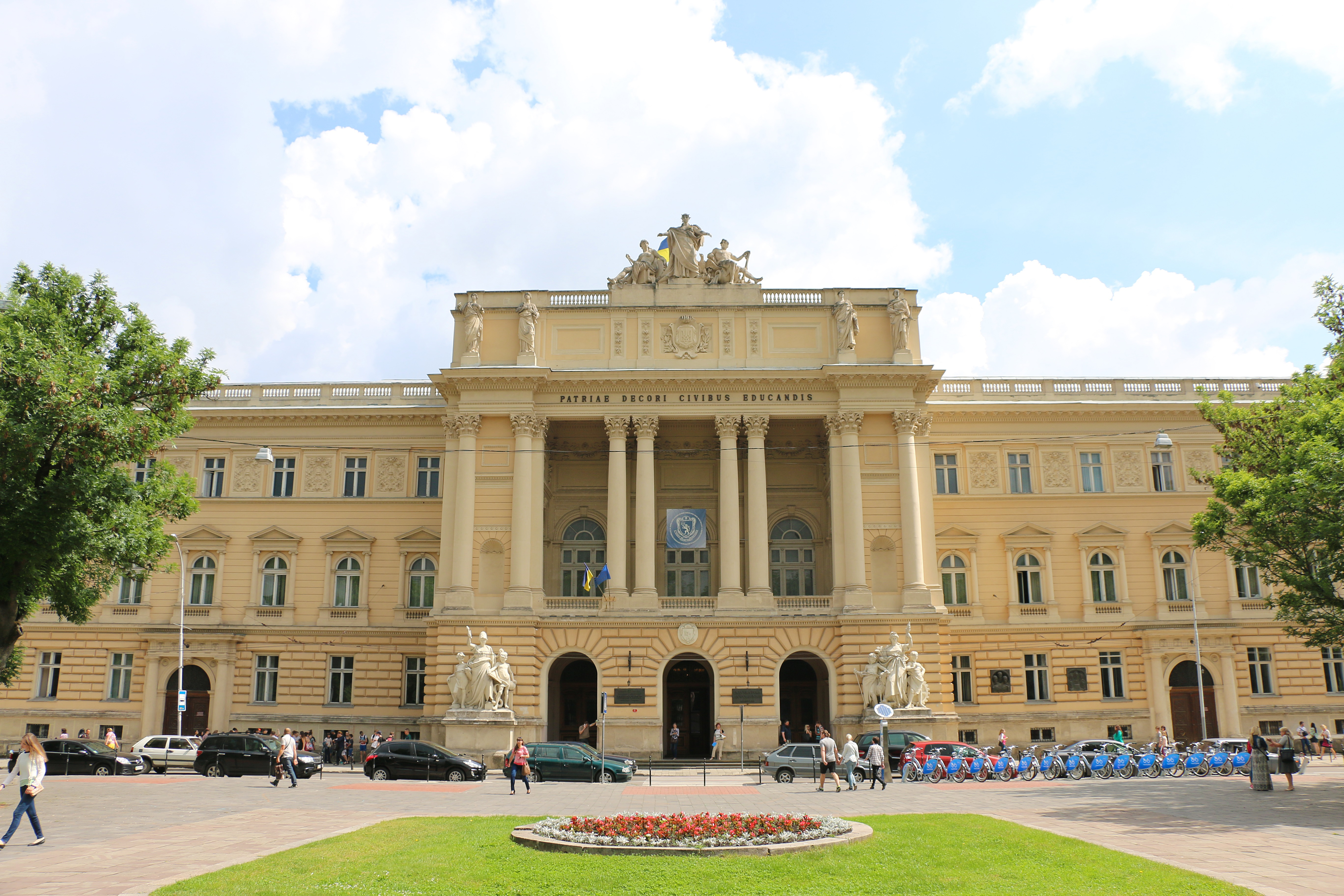

University rankings

Global – Overall
- QS World: 1201-1400 (2023)
- THE World: 1201–1500th (2023)

Regional – Overall
- QS Emerging Europe and Central Asia: 191 (2022)

The Ivan Franko National University of Lviv (named after Ivan Franko, Ukrainian: Львівський національний університет імені Івана Франка, romanized: Lvivskyi natsionalnyi universytet imeni Ivana Franka) is a state-sponsored university in Lviv, Ukraine. Since 1940 the university is named after Ukrainian poet Ivan Franko.

The university dates back to 1661 when John II Casimir, King of Poland and Grand Duke of Lithuania, granted it its first royal charter. Although the university’s activities were repeatedly interrupted and affected by political upheavals, it has preserved a continuity of tradition with the institution founded in 1661, which makes it, in this respect, the oldest institution of higher education in present-day Ukraine. The present institution can be dated to 1940.

== History ==
=== Polish–Lithuanian Commonwealth ===
The university was founded on 20 January 1661, when King and Grand Duke John II Casimir granted a charter to the city's Jesuit Collegium, founded in 1608, giving it "the honor of an academy and the title of a university". In 1589, the Jesuits had tried to found a university earlier, but did not succeed. Establishing another seat of learning in the Kingdom of Poland was seen as a threat by the authorities of Kraków's Jagiellonian University, which did not want a rival and stymied the Jesuits' plans for the following years.

According to the Treaty of Hadiach (1658), an Orthodox Ruthenian academy was to be created in Kyiv and another one in an unspecified location. The Jesuits suspected that it would be established in Lwów/Lviv on the foundations of the Orthodox Brotherhood's school, and used this as a pretext for obtaining a royal mandate that elevated their college to the status of an academy (no city could have two academies). King John II Casimir was a supporter of the Jesuits and his stance was crucial. The original royal charter was subsequently confirmed by another decree issued in Częstochowa on 5 February 1661.

In 1758, King Augustus III issued a decree, which described the Collegium as an academy, equal in fact status to the Jagiellonian University, with two faculties, those of Theology and Philosophy.

=== Austrian rule ===
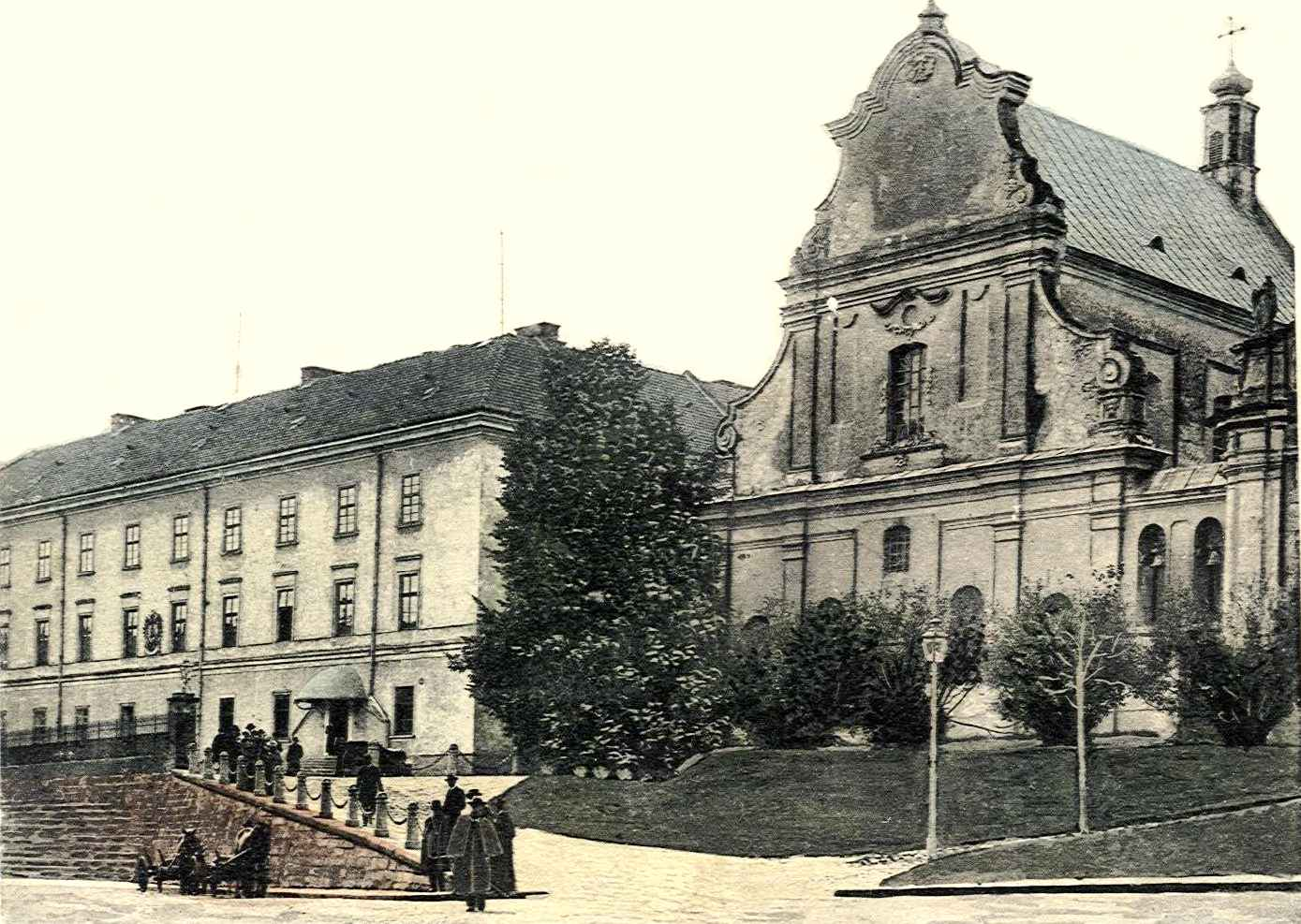
Old university building, now part of the complex of Intercession Church

In 1772, the city of Lwów was annexed by Austria (see: Partitions of Poland). Its German name was Lemberg and hence that of the university. In 1773, the Suppression of the Society of Jesus by Rome (Dominus ac Redemptor) was soon followed by the partition of the Polish-Lithuanian Commonwealth which meant that the university was excluded from the Commission of National Education reform. It was renamed Theresianum by the Austrians, i.e. a State Academy. On 21 October 1784, the Austrian Emperor Joseph II signed an act of foundation of a secular university. He began to Germanise the institution by bringing German-speaking professors from various parts of the empire. The university now had four faculties. To theology and philosophy were added those of law and medicine. Latin was the official language of the university, with Polish and German as auxiliary. Literary Slaveno-Rusyn (Ruthenian/Ukrainian) of the period had been used in the Studium Ruthenium (1787–1809), a special institute of the university for educating candidates for the Uniate (Greek-Catholic) priesthood.

In 1805, the university was closed, as Austria, then involved in the Napoleonic Wars, did not have sufficient funds to support it. It was transformed into an academic lyceum, which continued to provide higher education. It retained four faculties and a substantial part of the existing curriculum. The university was reopened in 1817. Officially Vienna described it as an "act of mercy", but the actual reasons were different. The Austrian government was aware of the pro-Polish stance of the Russian Emperor Alexander I and the Austrians wanted to challenge it. However, the quality of the university's education was not considered high. Latin was replaced by German and most professors were regarded as ''mediocre''. The few good ones regarded their stay in Lemberg as a springboard to other centres.

In 1848, when the pan-European revolution reached Lemberg (see: Revolutions of 1848), students of the university created two organizations: "The Academic Legion" and "the Academic Committee" both of which demanded that the university be Polonized. The government in Vienna answered with force, and on 2 November 1848, the centre of the city was shelled by the troops led by General Hammerstein striking the buildings of the university, especially its library. A curfew was called and the university was temporarily closed. Major demand for Ukrainians was the education of teachers and promotion of Ukrainian culture through Ukrainian courses at the university and to this end, a committee for the Defense of Ukrainian Education was created.

The university resumed its activities after the disruption caused by the events of 1848. Following the introduction of Galician autonomy, its administration and instruction were gradually Polonized. On 4 July 1871, Emperor Franz Joseph I issued a decree lifting restrictions on the use of Polish and Ruthenian (Ukrainian) as languages of instruction at the faculties of law and philosophy. Polish became the language of the university's internal administration. In 1879, Polish became the principal language of instruction.

It was reopened in January 1850, with only limited autonomy. After a few years the Austrians relented and on 4 July 1871 Vienna declared Polish and Ruthenian (Ukrainian) as the official languages at the university. Eight years later this was changed. The Austrian authorities declared Polish as the main teaching medium with Ruthenian and German as auxiliary. Examinations in the two latter languages were possible as long as the professors used them. This move created unrest among the Ruthenians (Ukrainians), who were demanding equal rights. In 1908, a Ruthenian student of the philosophy faculty, Miroslaw Siczynski, had assassinated the Polish governor of Galicia, Andrzej Kazimierz Potocki.

Meanwhile, the University of Lemberg thrived, being one of two Polish language universities in Galicia, the other one was the Jagiellonian University in Kraków. Its professors were famous across Europe, with such renowned names as Wladyslaw Abraham, Oswald Balzer, Szymon Askenazy, Stanislaw Zakrzewski, Zygmunt Janiszewski, Kazimierz Twardowski, Benedykt Dybowski, Marian Smoluchowski and Ludwik Rydygier.

In the 1870s, Ivan Franko studied at Lemberg University. He entered world history as a well-known Ukrainian scholar, public figure, writer, and translator. In 1894, the newly founded Chair of World History and the History of Eastern Europe was headed by Professor Mykhailo Hrushevskyi (1866–1934), a scholar of Ukrainian History, founder of the Ukrainian Historical School, and author of the ten-volume History of Ukraine-Rusʹ, hundreds of works on History, History of Literature, Historiography, and Source Studies. In 1904, a special summer course in Ukrainian studies was organized in Lviv, primarily for Eastern Ukrainian students.

The number of students grew from 1,732 in 1897 to 3,582 in 1906. Poles made up around 75% of the students, Ukrainians 20%, other nationalities 5%. In mid-December 1910, Ukrainian women students at Lviv University established a Student Union's women's branch, their twenty members meeting regularly to discuss current affairs. In July 1912, they met with their Jewish counterpart branch to discuss the representation of women in the student body of the university.

=== Second Polish Republic ===
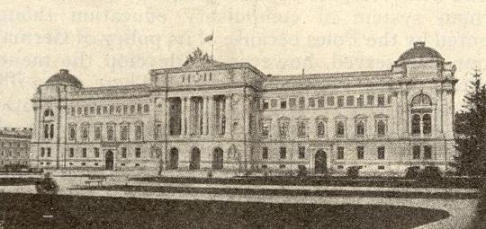
The main building of the University of Lviv was constructed to house the Diet of Galicia and Lodomeria

During the Interbellum period, the region was part of the Second Polish Republic and the university was known as "Jan Kazimierz University" (Polish: Uniwersytet Jana Kazimierza), in honor of its founder, King John II Casimir Vasa. The decision to name the school after the king was taken by the government of Poland on 22 November 1919.

In 1920, the university was rehoused by the Polish government in the building formerly used by the Sejm of the Land, which has since been the university's main location. Its first rector during the Second Polish Republic was the famous poet, Jan Kasprowicz.

Lwów was the second most important academic center in inter-war Poland. The Jan Kazimierz University was the third biggest university in the country after the University of Warsaw and the Jagiellonian University in Kraków. It was one of the most influential scholarly institutions of the Second Polish Republic, notable for its schools of mathematics (Stefan Banach, Hugo Steinhaus), logics (Kazimierz Twardowski), history and law (Oswald Balzer), anthropology (Jan Czekanowski), and geography (Eugeniusz Romer).

The university's library acquired, among others, the collection of Witold Kazimierz Czartoryski and 1,300 old Polish books from the 16th and 17th century, previously belonging to Józef Koziebrodzki. By September 1939, it expanded to 420,000 volumes, including 1,300 manuscripts, 3,000 diplomas and incunables, and possessed 14,000 numismatic items.

In 1924, the Philosophy Faculty was divided into Humanities and Mathematics and Biology Departments, thus there were now five faculties. In the 1934/35 academic year, the breakdown of the student body was as follows:

- Theology – 222 students
- Law – 2,978 students
- Medicine – 638 students (together with the Pharmaceutical Section, which had 263 students)
- Humanities – 892 students
- Mathematics and Biology – 870 students

Altogether, during the academic year 1934/35, there were 5900 students at the university, consisting by religious observance of:

- 3793 Roman Catholics (64.3%)
- 1211 Jews (20.5%)
- 739 Ukrainian Greek-Catholics (12.5%)
- 72 Orthodox (1.2%)
- 67 Protestants (1.1%)

Ukrainian professors were required to take a formal oath of allegiance to Poland; most of them refused and left the university in the early 1920s. The principle of "Numerus clausus" had been introduced after which Ukrainian applicants were discriminated against – Ukrainian applications were capped at 15% of the intake, whereas Poles enjoyed a 50% quota at the time.

Polish national-democrats also strove to implement a numerus clausus for Jews. During the 1920-30s, Polish national-democratic students chased local Jews and beat Jewish students, so that the university finally allow installment of ghetto benches for Jewish students.

=== World War II ===
After the German invasion of Poland and the accompanying Soviet invasion in September 1939, the Soviet administration permitted classes to continue. Initially, the school worked in the pre-war Polish system. On 18 October, however, the Polish rector, Professor Roman Longchamps de Bérier, was dismissed and replaced by Mykhailo Marchenko, a Ukrainian historian transferred from the Institute of Ukrainian History in Kyiv, grandfather of Ukrainian journalist and dissident Valeriy Marchenko. His role was to Ukrainize and Sovietize the university. At the beginning of January 1940, the official name of the university was changed to Ivan Franko Lviv State University. Ukrainian was introduced as the language of instruction. Polish professors and administrative assistants were increasingly fired and replaced by cadres specializing in Marxism, Leninism, political economics, as well as Ukrainian and Soviet literature, history, and geography. This was accompanied by the closure of departments seen as related to religion, free-market economics, capitalism, or the West in general. All academics specializing in Polish geography, literature, and history were dismissed. Marchenko was released from his post in Spring 1940 and arrested in June 1941. From 1939 to 1941, the Soviets killed 17 and imprisoned 37 academics from the University of Jan Kazimierz.

After Lviv was occupied by the Nazi Germany in June 1941, the Germans closed the University of Ivan Franko and killed over 20 Polish professors (as well as members of their households and guests, increasing the total number of victims to above forty). The victims included lecturers from the University of Lviv and other local academic institutions. Among the killed was the last rector of the University of Jan Kazimierz, Roman Longchamps de Berier, his three sons, and the former Polish prime minister and a polytechnic professor, Kazimierz Bartel. (Note: The extent to which Ukrainian nationalists may have been involved in identifying and selecting some of the victims is still a matter of debate, as Polish historian Adam Redzik wrote, while a group of Ukrainian nationalist students most likely helped to prepare the lists of Polish academics, it is unlikely they expected or knew about their intended purposes (i.e., the executions).) The underground University of Jan Kazimierz was established in Autumn 1941.

In the summer of 1944, the advancing Red Army, assisted by the Polish Home Army forces (locally implementing Operation Tempest), pushed the Wehrmacht out of Lviv. and the university reopened. Due to post-war border changes, the Polish population of the city was expelled and most of the Polish academics from the University of Jan Kazimierz relocated to Wrocław (former Breslau), where they filled positions in the newly established Polish institutions of higher learning. The buildings of the university had survived the war undestroyed, however, 80% of its pre-war student and academic body was gone. The traditions of Jan Kazimierz University have been duplicated at the University of Wrocław, which replaced the pre-war University of Breslau after the German inhabitants of that city had been expelled following Stalin's establishing Germany's eastern border farther to the west.

=== Ukrainian SSR ===
Following the Soviet annexation of Western Ukraine in September 1939, Lviv University was nationalized and integrated into the educational system of the Ukrainian Soviet Socialist Republic. In October 1939 the institution was reorganized as Lviv State University, and in January 1940 it was renamed Ivan Franko Lviv State University by decree of the Presidium of the Supreme Council of the Ukrainian SSR.

The new authorities pursued a policy of rapid Sovietization and formal “Ukrainization”: Marxism–Leninism and political economy were introduced into the curriculum, Ukrainian was declared the main language of instruction, and several prominent Ukrainian scholars from other regions of the republic were appointed to the teaching staff, while a number of Polish professors continued to work at the university. At the same time, the university was affected by Stalinist repression: several waves of arrests targeted faculty and students, particularly Polish academics and suspected Ukrainian nationalists, and in January 1940 a show trial was staged against 59 alleged members of the Organization of Ukrainian Nationalists, many of them students of the university.

After the end of the Second World War and the restoration of Soviet rule in Lviv in 1944, Ivan Franko Lviv State University reopened and entered a prolonged period of expansion as one of the leading universities of the Ukrainian SSR. By the 1950s and 1960s new faculties, including journalism, applied mathematics and cybernetics, were established, the student body grew rapidly and the university developed a broad network of research institutes and laboratories. During the postwar decades the university also played a central role in the Russification and ideological control of higher education in Western Ukraine: instruction in many disciplines gradually shifted from Ukrainian to Russian, courses in Marxism–Leninism and the history of the Communist Party were compulsory, and scholars who departed from the official line risked sanctions or dismissal.

Despite ideological pressure, Lviv University remained an important centre of Ukrainian humanities and natural sciences and a locus of dissent in the region. Historians, philologists and philosophers associated with the university made significant contributions to Ukrainian national historiography and literary studies, often working within the constraints of Soviet censorship. From the 1960s onwards, clandestine groups of Ukrainian students circulated samizdat literature and maintained contacts with dissident circles; several staff and graduates were later counted among the Ukrainian human rights movement and the leaders of the national-democratic revival of the late 1980s. By the time of Ukraine’s declaration of independence in 1991, Ivan Franko Lviv State University had a student body of more than 14,000 and a staff of over 1,000 academics.

=== Independent Ukraine ===
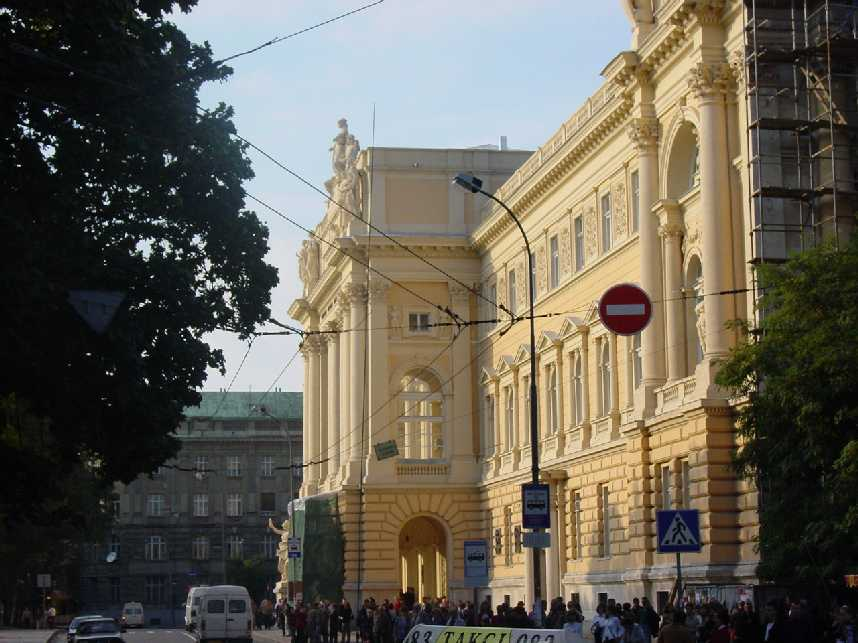
Ivan Franko University main building (2005)

The proclamation of the independence of Ukraine in 1991 brought about radical changes in every sphere of university life. Professor, Doctor Ivan Vakarchuk, a renowned scholar in the field of theoretical physics, was rector of the university from 1990 to 2013. Meeting the requirements arising in recent years new faculties and departments have been set up: the Faculty of International Relations and the Faculty of Philosophy (1992), the Faculty of Pre-Entrance University Preparation (1997), the Chair of Translation Studies and Comparative Linguistics (1998). Since 1997 the following new units have come into existence within the teaching and research framework of the university: the Law College, The Humanities Centre, The Institute of Literature Studies, and The Italian Language and Culture Resource Centre. The teaching staff of the university has increased amounting to 981, with scholarly degrees awarded to over two-thirds of the entire teaching staff. There are over one hundred laboratories and working units as well as the Computing Centre functioning here. The Zoological, Geological, Mineralogical Museums together with those of Numismatics, Sphragistics, and Archeology are stimulating the interests of students.

== Faculties ==
- Faculty of Applied Mathematics and Informatics
- Faculty of International Relations
- Faculty of Biology
- Faculty of Journalism
- Faculty of Chemistry
- Faculty of Law
- Faculty of Economics
- Faculty of Mechanics and Mathematics
- Faculty of Electronics
- Faculty of Philology
- Faculty of Foreign Languages
- Faculty of Philosophy
- Faculty of Geography
- Faculty of Physics
- Faculty of Geology
- Faculty of Preuniversity Training
- Faculty of History
- Department of Pedagogy
- Department of Law

=== Research divisions and facilities ===
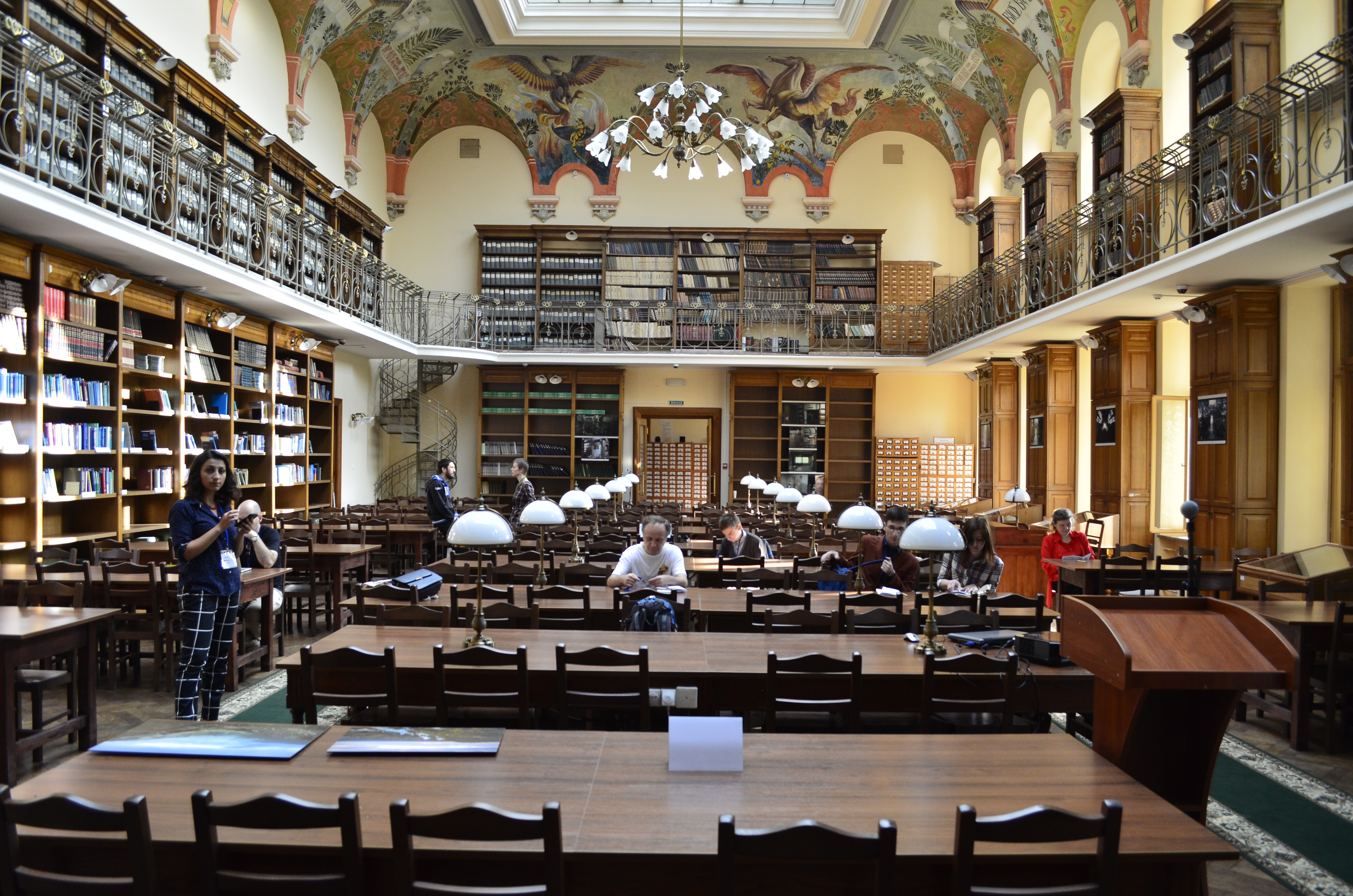
University Library

- Scientific Research Department
- Zoological museum
- University Library
- Journal of Physical Studies
- The Institute of Archaeology
- Ukrainian journal of computational linguistics
- Media Ecology Institute
- Modern Ukraine
- Institute for Historical Research
- Regional Agency for Sustainable Development
- Botanical Garden
- NATO Winter Academy in Lviv
- Scientific technical & educational center of low temperature studies

== University management ==
- Rector Volodymyr Melnyk, Doctor of Philosophy, Professor, Corresponding Member of the National Academy of Sciences of Ukraine;
- First Vice-Rector Andriy Gukalyuk, Candidate of Economic Sciences, Associate Professor;
- Vice-Rector for Research Roman Hladyshevsky, Corresponding Member of the National Academy of Sciences of Ukraine, Doctor of Chemical Sciences, Professor;
- Vice-rector for scientific and pedagogical work and social issues and development Volodymyr Kachmar, Candidate of Historical Sciences, Associate Professor;
- Vice-rector for scientific and pedagogical work and informatization Vitaliy Kukharsky, Candidate of Physical and Mathematical Sciences, Associate Professor;
- Vice-rector for administrative and economic work Vasyl Kurlyak, Candidate of Physical and Mathematical Sciences, Associate Professor.

== International cooperation ==
During 2016–2017, the university signed 15 cooperation agreements and two double degree agreements, two agreements were extended. In total, 147 agreements have been signed with higher education institutions from 38 countries.

The university is involved in signing the Magna Charta Universitatum. In 2000, the university became a co-founder of the European College of Polish and Ukrainian Universities (Lublin, Poland). Agreements with Alecu Russo State University of Bălți (Bălți, Moldova) and the Krakow Pedagogical Academy (Poland) have been extended.

Students of the faculty of Geography, History and the faculty of International Relations undergo internships in Poland, Germany, Austria, Hungary, the Czech Republic, and Slovakia. Employees of the faculty of Mechanics, Mathematics, Philology, Chemistry, Faculty of International Relations and Applied Mathematics and Informatics worked in higher education institutions in Poland, Colombia, France, Switzerland, and Austria on a contract basis. Many graduates continue their studies in higher education institutions in the United States, Poland, Germany, Austria, Britain, and France. In 2016, Ivan Franko National University of Lviv held 5 international summer schools.

In 2016, active international cooperation was established with foreign partners. The university has conducted bilateral research with the University of Vienna (Austria), Kaunas University of Technology (Lithuania), the US Civilian Research and Development Foundation, and the Hiroshima Institute of Technology (Japan), funded by the Ministry of Education and Science of Ukraine.

In recent years, researchers at the university have been conducting experiments funded by international organizations, including the Max Planck Institute for Biophysical Chemistry (Germany), Harvard Medical School (USA), Novartis Institute for Biomedical Research (USA), and the Canadian Institute of Ukrainian Studies at the University of Alberta, International Center for Diffraction Data (USA), Andrew W. Mellon Foundation (USA), Trust Educational Foundation for Tree Research (USA), Material. Phases. Data. System company (Switzerland).

An agreement has been signed with CrossRef, which allows the DOI to be assigned to university publications. The university, with the financial support of the Ministry of Education and Science of Ukraine, has a national contact point of the EU Framework Program "Horizon 2020" in the thematic areas "Future and latest technologies" and "Inclusive, innovative and smart society".

== Notable alumni ==
- Roman Aftanazy (1914–2004), historian of culture, librarian, heritage rescuer
- Kazimierz Ajdukiewicz (1890–1963), philosopher, mathematician and logician, a pioneer of categorial grammar
- Bohdan Ihor Antonych (1909–1937), prominent Ukrainian writer
- Marta Barandii (b. 1984), Ukrainian member activist and lawyer
- Piotr Ignacy Bieńkowski (1865–1925), classical scholar and archaeologist, professor of the Jagiellonian University
- Julia Brystiger (1902–1975), political militant, member of the security apparatus of the Polish People's Republic
- Józef Białynia Chołodecki (1852–1934), historian of Lviv.
- Marianna Dushar (born 1974), anthropologist and food writer.
- Ivan Franko (1856–1916), poet and linguist, reformer of the Ukrainian language
- Ludwik Fleck (1896–1961), medical doctor and biologist who developed in the 1930s the concept of thought collectives
- Stanisław Głąbiński (1862–1941) politician, professor and rector (1908–1909) of the university, lawyer and writer
- Georgiy R. Gongadze (1969–2000), Georgian and Ukrainian journalist
- Ludwik Hass (1918-2008), Polish historian and Trotskyist dissident
- Mark Kac (1914–1984), mathematician, pioneer of modern probability theory
- Wiktor Kemula (1902–1985), chemist
- Zygmunt Klemensiewicz (1886–1963), physicist and physical chemist
- Yevhen Konovalets (1891–1938) leader of the Organization of Ukrainian Nationalists between 1929 and 1938
- Ihor Kobrin (1951–2023), film director
- Emil Korytko (1813–1839), Polish philologist and ethnologist who worked in the Slovene Lands
- Stanisław Kot (1885–1975), scientist and politician, member of the Polish Government in Exile
- Tadeusz Kotarbiński (1881–1981), philosopher, mathematician, logician
- Hersch Lauterpacht (1897–1960), lawyer and Developer of the legal concept of "Crimes Against Humanity" in the Nuremberg Trials and writer of "An International Bill of the Rights of Man"
- Pinhas Lavon (1904–1976), Israeli politician
- Franciszek Leja (1885–1979), mathematician
- Raphael Lemkin (1900–1959), lawyer who introduced the term "genocide", an author of the United Nations' Convention on Genocide
- Mariya Lyudkevych (born 1948), writer and poet
- Antoni Łomnicki (1881–1941), mathematician
- Jerzy Łoś (1920–1998), mathematician, logician, economist, philosopher
- Jan Łukasiewicz (1878–1956), mathematician
- Stanisław Maczek (1892–1994), commander of the First Polish Armoured Division, the last Commander of the First Polish Army Corps under Allied Command
- Kazimierz Michałowski (1901–1981), archeologist and Egyptologist
- Semyon Mogilevich (born 1946), economist and mafia boss
- Władysław Orlicz (1903–1990), mathematician
- Jan Parandowski (1895–1978), writer, essayist, and translator, expert on classical antiquity
- Helena Polaczkówna (1881–1942), historian and archivist, war activist
- Maria Polaczkówna (1878–1944), historian and archivist, war activist
- Stepan Popel (1909–1987), Ukrainian chess player and linguist
- Mykhailo Potebenko (born 1937), Ukrainian lawyer, Prosecutor General
- Maciej Rataj (1884–1940), Polish politician, acting president
- Jaroslav Rudnyckyj (1910–1995), Ukrainian Canadian linguist, lexicographer, folklorist
- Ivan L. Rudnytsky (1919–1984), Canadian historian of Ukraine, political scientist, Public intellectual
- Marta Rzewuska-Frankowska (1889–1954), Polish anthropologist, educator
- Leon Reich (1879–1929), lawyer and member of the Sejm of Poland
- Zoryslava Romovska (born 1940), lawyer, politician and People's Deputy of Ukraine in the Verkhovna Rada
- Juliusz Schauder (1899–1943), mathematician
- Józef Schreier (1909–1943), mathematician
- Bruno Schulz (1892–1942), novelist and painter
- Markiyan Shashkevych (1811–1843), Ukrainian poet
- Zoia Skoropadenko (born 1978), Ukrainian artist
- Josyf Slipyj (1892–1984), head of the Ukrainian Greek Catholic Church
- Louis B. Sohn (1914–2006), international law scholar and advisor, helped create the International Court of Justice, advisor to United States State Department, chaired professor at Harvard University and University of Georgia law schools in the United States
- Leonid Stein (1934–1973), grandmaster and Soviet Chess Champion
- Hugo Steinhaus (1887–1982), mathematician, educator, and humanist
- Julian Stryjkowski (1905–1996), Polish-Jewish journalist and writer
- Constantin Tomaszczuk (1840–1889), Romanian jurist and professor, first rector of the University of Czernowitz
- Irena Turkevycz-Martynec (1899–1983), Ukrainian Opera Soprano
- Stefania Turkewich (1898–1977), Ukrainian composer, pianist, and musicologist
- Stanislaw Ulam (1909–1984) He participated in the Manhattan Project, originated the Teller–Ulam design of thermonuclear weapons, discovered the concept of the cellular automaton, invented the Monte Carlo method of computation, and suggested nuclear pulse propulsion.
- Yuri Velykanovych (1910–1938), journalist, volunteer of the International Brigades
- Aizik Isaakovich Vol'pert (1923–2006), mathematician and chemical engineer
- Rudolf Weigl (1883–1957), biologist and inventor of the first effective vaccine for epidemic typhus
- Władysław Witwicki (1878–1948), psychologist, philosopher, translator and artist
- Natalia Yakovenko (born 1942), Ukrainian historian
- Liubomyr Zubach (born 1978), Ukrainian politician

== Notable professors ==
- Henryk Arctowski (1871–1958) - oceanographer, Antarctica explorer
- Szymon Askenazy (1866–1935) - historian, diplomat and politician, founder of the Lwów-Warsaw School of History
- Herman Auerbach (1901–1942) - mathematician
- Stefan Banach (1892–1945) - mathematician, one of the moving spirits of the Lwów School of Mathematics, father of functional analysis
- Oswald Balzer (1858–1933) - historian of law and statehood
- St. Józef Bilczewski (1860–1923) - archbishop of the city of Lwów of the Latins
- Tadeusz Boy-Żeleński (1874–1941) - gynecologist, writer, poet, art critic, translator of French literary classics and journalist
- Franciszek Bujak (1921–1941) - historian
- Leon Chwistek (1884–1944) - Avant-garde painter, theoretician of modern art, literary critic, logician, philosopher and mathematician
- Antoni Cieszyński (1882–1941) - physician, dentist and surgeon
- Matija Čop (1797–1835) - Slovene philologist and literary theorist
- Jan Czekanowski (1882–1965) - anthropologist, statistician and linguist
- Władysław Dobrzaniecki (1897–1941) - physician and surgeon
- Stanisław Głąbiński (1862–1941) - politician, rector (1908–1909), lawyer and writer
- Yakiv Holovatsky (1814–1888) - poet
- Mykhailo Hrushevsky (1866–1934) - historian, organizer of scholarship, leader of the pre-revolution Ukrainian national movement, head of Ukraine's parliament, first president of Ukraine, who wrote an academic book titled: "Bar Starostvo: Historical Notes: XV-XVIII" about the history of Bar, Ukraine.
- Stefan Inglot (1902–1994) - historian
- Zygmunt Janiszewski (1888–1920) - mathematician
- Antoni Kalina (1846–1905) - ethnographer and ethnologist
- Stefan Kaczmarz (1895-1939) - mathematician
- Ignacy Krasicki (1735–1801) - writer and poet, senator, Bishop of Warmia and Archbishop of Gniezno and Primate of Poland
- Jerzy Kuryłowicz (1895–1978) - linguist
- Karolina Lanckorońska (1898–2002) - historian and art historian, Polish World War II resistance fighter
- Jan Łukasiewicz (1878–1956) - logician and philosopher
- Ignác Martinovics (1755–1795) - physicist, Franciscan, Hungarian revolutionary
- Stanisław Mazur (1905–1981) - mathematician
- Jakub Karol Parnas (1884–1949) - (Russian: Яков Оскарович Парнас or Yakov Oskarovich Parnas). A Jewish-Polish–Soviet biochemist author of notable studies on carbohydrates metabolism in mammals. Glycolysis, a major metabolic mechanism, is universally named Embden-Meyerhoff-Parnas pathway after him.
- Viktor Pynzenyk (born 1954) - economist and politician
- Bronisław Radziszewski (1838–1914) - chemist
- Eugeniusz Romer (1871–1954) - cartographer
- Eugeniusz Rybka (1898–1988) - astronomer, deputy director of the International Astronomical Union,
- Stanisław Ruziewicz (1881–1941) - mathematician
- Wacław Sierpiński (1882–1969) - mathematician, known for contributions to set theory, number theory, theory of functions and topology
- Marian Smoluchowski (1872–1917) - scientist, pioneer of statistical physics, creator the basis of the theory of stochastic processes, mountaineer
- Hugo Steinhaus (1887–1972) - mathematician
- Szczepan Szczeniowski (1898-1979) - physicist, author of numerous papers on cosmic rays,
- Kazimierz Twardowski (1866–1938) - philosopher and logician, head of the Lwów-Warsaw School of Logic
- Ivan Vakarchuk (1947–2020) - physicist, Minister of Education of Ukraine
- Rudolf Weigl (1883-1957) - biologist, epidemiologist
- Aleksander Zawadzki (1798-1868) - naturalist

== Other ==
- János Bolyai (1802–1860), mathematician, the founder of noneuclidean (absolute) geometry. The highest figure of Hungarian mathematics worked at the University of Lviv from 1831 to 1832.
- Włodzimierz Dzieduszycki (1825–1899), landowner, naturalist, political activist, collector and patron of arts
- Stanisław Lem (1921–2006), satirical, philosophical, and science fiction writer
- Józef Marcinkiewicz (1910–1940), mathematician. He worked at the University of Lviv from 1935 to 1936.
- Ignacy Jan Paderewski (1860–1941) virtuoso pianist, composer, diplomat and politician, the third Prime Minister of Poland

== See also ==
- List of early modern universities in Europe
- Massacre of Lwów professors
- Ukrainian Free University
- List of universities in Ukraine
- Publishing house Svit, closely connected to the University of Lviv since 1946

== Literature ==
- Academia Militans. Uniwersytet Jana Kazimierza we Lwowie, red. Adam Redzik, Kraków 2015, ss. 1302.
- Ludwik Finkel, Starzyński Stanisław, Historya Uniwersytetu Lwowskiego, Lwów 1894.
- Franciszek Jaworski, Uniwersytet Lwowski. Wspomnienie jubileuszowe, Lwów 1912.
- Adam Redzik, Wydział Prawa Uniwersytetu Lwowskiego w latach 1939–1946, Lublin 2006
- Adam Redzik, Prawo prywatne na Uniwersytecie Jana Kazimierza we Lwowie, Warszawa 2009.
- Józef Wołczański, Wydział Teologiczny Uniwersytetu Jana Kazimierza 1918–1939, Kraków 2000.
- Universitati Leopoliensi, Trecentesimum Quinquagesimum Anniversarium Suae Fundationis Celebranti. In Memoriam. Praca zbiorowa. Polska Akademia Umiejętności, Kraków 2011, ISBN 978-83-7676-084-1
