= List of bishops of Poznań =

Given below is the list of bishops of Poznań.

== Bishops of Poznań ==
| Name | Years on bishops throne | Notes |
|---|---|---|
| Jordan | 968 – ca.983 | Missionary bishop of Poland with seat in Poznań, probably subordinate directly to the pope or subordinate to the archbishop of Mainz. Date of death uncertain (between 982 and 984) |
| Unger | ca.983/992–1012 | At first missionary bishop of Poland, from 1000 ordinary bishop of Poznań independent of the archdiocese of Gniezno; after 1004 subordinate to a metropolitan archbishop of Magdeburg. Date of ingres unclear, consecrated certainly in 982 or 983, but arrived to Poland perhaps only in 992 |
| Romanus | (?) – 1030 | Unsure if he was bishop of Poznań. Date of ingres unknown (perhaps 1012) |
| Ederam | 1030s. | Exact dates unknown. Destruction of the diocese ca. 1038 due to pagan uprising and invasion of Bretislaus I, Duke of Bohemia. Bishop Ederam died before 1049 |
| Franko | ca.1085 | First known bishop of Poznań, subordinate to a metropolitan archbishop of Gniezno, after the diocese was reestablished in 1076. Dates of ingres and death unknown (perhaps 1076 and ca. 1100) |
| Eckhard | ca. 1100–1103? | Date of ingres uncertain (between 1097 and 1102). Date of the end of the episcopate unsure (he may have been deposed in 1103) |
| Heinrich von Siegburg | ca. 1105 | Dates of ingres and death unknown (perhaps 1103 and ca. 1109) |
| Paweł | ca. 1112/1113 | Dates of ingres and death unknown (the first probably before 1110) |
| Bogufał I | ? -1146 | date of ingres is unknown |
| Pean | 1146–1152 | |
| Stefan | 1152–1159 | |
| Bernard | 1159–1164 | |
| Radwan | 1164–1172 | |
| Cherubin | 1172–1180 | date of end of service is unsure |
| Arnold I | 1180–1186 | date of ingres is unsure |
| Świętosław | ca.1186? | Name and date unsure |
| Gerward | ca.1187? | Name and date unsure |
| Benedykt | 1193 | Dates of ingres and death unknown (first perhaps 1187, the second 1193/95) |
| Mrokota | ? – 1196 | Date of ingres unknown (between 1193 and 1196) |
| Arnold II | 1201–1211 | Date of ingres unknown (perhaps 1196) |
| Filip | 1211 | |
| Paweł | 1211–1242 | |
| Bogufał II | 1242–1253 | |
| Piotr | 1253–1254 | |
| Bogufał III of Czerniejewo | 1254–1264 | |
| Falanta | 1265–1267 | |
| Mikołaj I | 1267–1278 | |
| Jan I of Wysokowce, Łodzia coat of arms | 1278–1285 | |
| Jan II Gerbicz, Nałęcz coat of arms | 1285–1297 | |
| Andrzej Zaremba | 1297–1317 | date of end of service is unsure |
| Domarat Grzymała | 1318–1324 | date of ingres in unsure |
| Jan III, Doliwa coat of arms | 1324–1335 | |
| Jan IV of Kępa, Łodzia coat of arms | 1335–1346 | |
| Andrzej of Wiślica | 1347–1348 | later bishop of Zwierzyniec |
| Wojciech Pałuka | 1348–1355 | |
| Jan V of Lutogniewo, Doliwa coat of arms | 1356–1374 | |
| Mikołaj II of Górka (of Kórnik) Łodzia coat of arms | 1375–1382 | |
| Jan Kropidło | 1382–1384 | Duke of Opole, later bishop of Włocławek, Kamień, Chełmno, nominated archbishop of Gniezno and again bishop of Włocławek |
| Dobrogost of Nowy Dwór Nałęcz coat of arms | 1384–1395 | later archbishop of Gniezno and Primate of Poland |
| Mikołaj Kurowski, Szreniawa coat of arms | 1395–1399 | later bishop of Włocławek, archbishop of Gniezno and Primate of Poland |
| Wojciech Jastrzębiec | 1399–1412 | |
| Piotr Wysz Radoliński, Leszczyc coat of arms | 1413–1414 | |
| Andrzej Łaskarz Gosławski, Godziemba coat of arms | 1414–1426 | |
| Mirosław Brudzewski, Nałęcz coat of arms | 1426–1427 | |
| Stanisław Ciołek of Żelichowo and Ostrołęka | 1428–1437 | |
| Andrzej Bniński, Łodzia coat of arms | 1438–1479 | |
| Uriel Górka, Łodzia coat of arms | 1479–1498 | |
| Jan Lubrański, Godziemba coat of arms | 1498–1520 | fundator of Lubrański Academy |
| Piotr Tomicki, Łodzia coat of arms | 1520–1525 | later bishop of Cracow |
| Jan Latalski | 1525–1536 | later bishop of Cracow, archbishop of Gniezno and Primate of Poland |
| John of the Lithuanian Dukes | 1536–1538 | Illegitimate son of Sigismund I the Old, King of Poland |
| Stanisław Oleśnicki of Pinczów | 1538–1539 | |
| Sebastian Branicki | 1539–1544 | |
| Paweł Dunin Wolski | 1544–1546 | |
| Benedykt Izdbieński | 1546–1553 | |
| Andrzej Czarnkowski | 1553–1562 | |
| Adam Konarski | 1562–1574 | |
vacant
| Łukasz Kościelecki | 1577–1597 | |
| Jan Tarnowski | 1598–1600 | later bishop of Włocławek, archbishop of Gniezno and Primate of Poland |
| Wawrzyniec Goślicki, Grzymała coat of arms | 1601–1607 | |
| Andrzej Opaliński | 1607–1623 | |
| Jan Wężyk | 1624–1627 | later archbishop of Gniezno and Primate of Poland |
| Maciej Łubieński | 1627–1631 | later bishop of Włocławek, archbishop of Gniezno and Primate of Poland |
| Adam Nowodworski | 1631–1634 | |
| Henryk Firlej | 1635 | |
| Andrzej Szołdrski | 1636–1650 | |
| Florian Kazimierz Czartoryski | 1650–1655 | later bishop of Włocławek, archbishop of Gniezno and Primate of Poland |
| Wojciech Tolibowski | 1655–1663 | |
| Stefan Wierzbowski | 1664–1687 | |
| Stanisław Witwicki | 1688–1698 | |
| Mikołaj Święcicki | 1699–1707 | |
vacant
| Mikołaj Bartłomiej Tarło | 1710–1715 | |
| Krzysztof Antoni Szembek | 1716–1720 | later bishop of Włocławek, archbishop of Gniezno and Primate of Poland |
| Piotr Tarło | 1721–1722 | |
| Jan Joachim Tarło | 1722–1732 | |
| Stanisław Józef Hozjusz | 1733–1738 | |
| Teodor Kaziemirz Czartoryski | 1739–1768 | |
| Andrzej Stanisław Młodziejowski | 1768–1780 | |
| Antoni Onufry Okęcki | 1780–1793 | |
| Ignacy Raczyński | 1794–1806 | later archbishop of Gniezno and Primate of Poland |
vacant
| Tymoteusz Gorzeński | 1809–1821 | later archbishop of Gniezno, Primate of Poland. |
In 1821 raised to status of metropolis and personal union with Gniezno archbishopric, primates of Poland.
| Tymoteusz Gorzeński | 1821–1825 | |
vacant
| Teofil Wolicki | 1828–1829 | |
vacant
| Marcin Dunin | 1831–1842 | |
vacant
| Leon Przyłuski | 1845–1865 | |
| Mieczysław Halka Ledóchowski | 1866–1886 | cardinal |
| Juliusz Dinder | 1886–1890 | |
| Florian Oksza Stablewski | 1891–1906 | |
vacant
| Edward Likowski | 1914–1915 | |
| Edmund Dalbor | 1915–1926 | cardinal |
| August Hlond | 1926–1946 | cardinal, after 1946 Archbishop of Gniezno and Warsaw, primate of Poland |
In 1946 dissolution of personal union between archbishoprics of Poznań and Gniezno
| Walenty Dymek | 1946–1956 | |
| Antoni Baraniak | 1957–1977 | |
| Jerzy Stroba | 1978–1996 | |
| Juliusz Paetz | 1996–2002 | |
| Stanisław Gądecki | 2002–2025 | |
| Zbigniew Zieliński | since 2025 | |

== Auxiliary Bishops ==
- Stanisław Dzedziński (1568-1573)

== See also ==
- Goswin (bishop of Poznań)
- Archdiocese of Poznań
- Archcathedral Basilica of St. Peter and St. Paul, Poznań
