= Mikołaj II of Górka =

Łodzia coat of arms

Mikołaj of Kórnik (died 1382), was bishop of Poznań from 1375-1382.

== Biography ==
His family were of the Łodzia coat of arms. He was a son of Mikołaj from Będlewo, nephew of the bishop of Poznań, Jan of the Łodzia coat of arms. He studied law in Italy, finishing his doctorate with decrees, which he obtained before 1365. After returning to Poland (between 9 July 1365 and 27 January 1368) he became a cantor in Poznań. He also related to the court of Bodzanta, Bodzanty, who appointed him the court judge, in 1359 a canon of Cracow, and in 1364 as the vicar of Bishop.

In 1366, the Pope appointed him a canon of Gniezno, and in 1368 he received the provost of the Blessed Virgin Mary in Kraków. He was also a papal sub-collector, and from 1365 or 1366 to 1372 he was the office of the Chancellor of Greater Poland. Thanks to this last office, he established close relations with the court of King Ludwik Węgierski, which allowed him to remove political opponents, the most powerful of which was the Crown Deputy Chancellor Jan of Czarnków. Probably Nicholas contributed to accusing him of profaning the tomb of Casimir the Great and stealing the coronation insignia, which meant that Jan was deprived of office.

After the death of Jan of Lutogniew, the Poznań bishop's office slowed down. On 7 May 1375 he received the sacrament and sat on the throne of the Poznań bishop. As a bishop he began reconstruction in the Gothic style of the Poznań Cathedral and surrounded Słupca with walls. In politics, he was asking for favors and further assignments for the bishopric of the Mazovian Piasts, but otherwise he did not show any particular political line. In the consciousness of successive generations, his negative picture was fixed by Janek of Czarnków, who described him as a dishonest and corrupt man. He died on 18 March 1382 in Ciążeń, he was buried in the Poznań cathedral.
