= Ostrów Tumski, Poznań =

Island in the Warta river, Poznań, Poland

Coordinates: 52°24′42″N 16°56′55″E

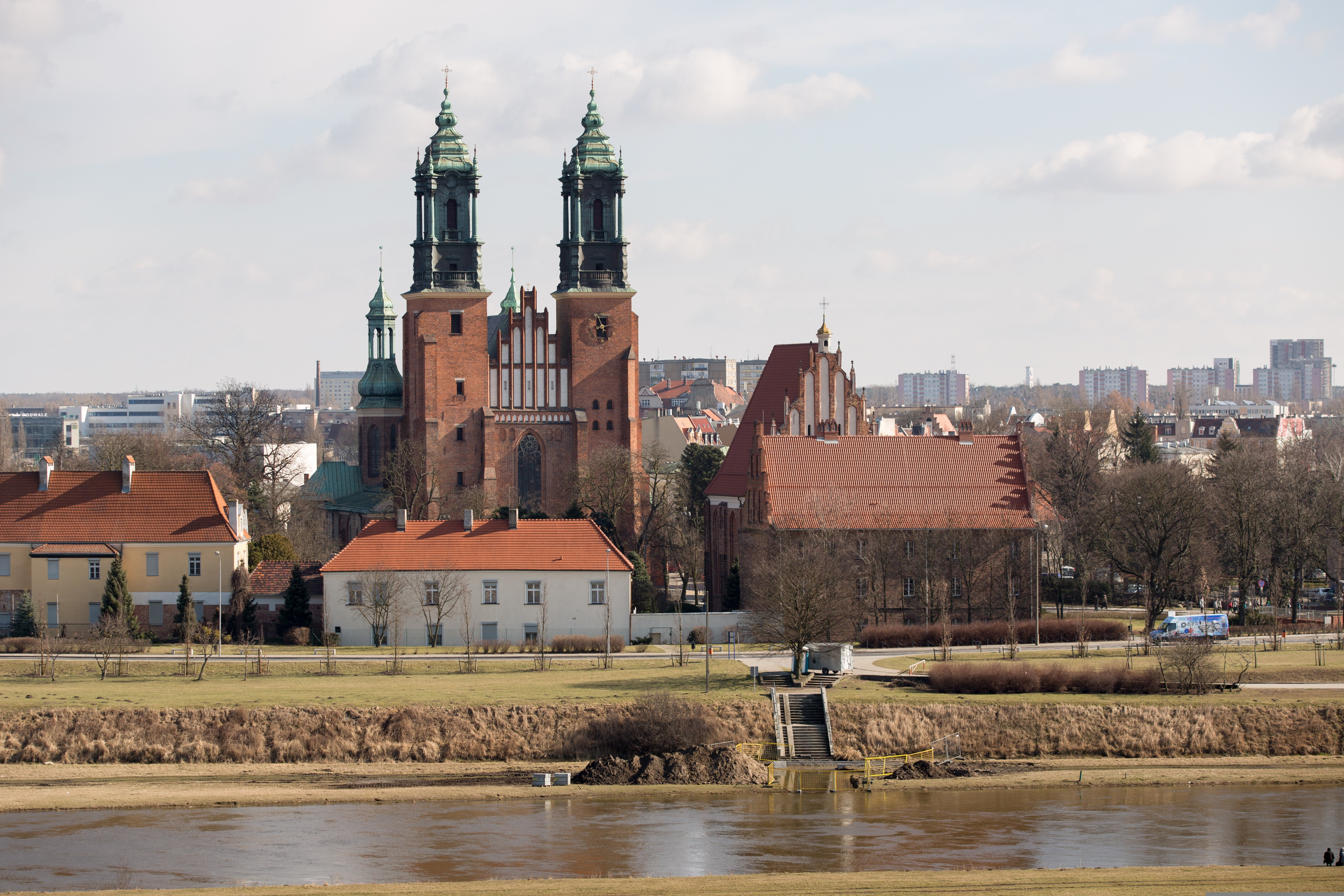
View of the island and its structures along the river Warta from the west. In the centre is the Poznań Cathedral

Coat of arms of Ostrów Tumski

Ostrów Tumski (Polish: [ˈɔstruf ˈtumskʲi], "Cathedral Island"; German: Dom Insel) is an island between two branches of the river Warta in the city of Poznań in western Poland. Poznań Cathedral and other ecclesiastical buildings occupy the central part of the island. Ostrów Tumski is part of the city's former Nowe Miasto ("New Town") district, although it is actually the oldest part of the city, where the rulers of the early Polish state in the 10th century had one of their palaces. The site is listed as one of Poland's official national Historic Monuments (Pomnik historii), as designated November 28, 2008, along with other portions of the city's historic core. Its listing is maintained by the National Heritage Board of Poland.

In the current administrative division of Poznań, Ostrów Tumski is part of an osiedle which also includes the neighbourhoods of Śródka, Zawady and Komandoria, all on the east side of the river.

== Early history ==
Ostrów Tumski was formerly one of several adjacent islands formed between branches of the Warta and Cybina rivers close to their confluence. To the south-west were the islands of Chwaliszewo and Grobla; the main stream of the Warta flowed between these. The first known fortified settlement (gród) on Ostrów Tumski dates from the 8th or 9th century. In the 10th century the settlement on the island became one of the main political centres of the Piast domains, which in turn formed the hub of the early Polish state. Archaeological work carried out in 1999 revealed that the ducal palace stood on the site now occupied by the Church of the Virgin Mary (west of the cathedral). The palace was joined to a chapel, believed to be the first Christian temple in Poland. It was probably first used by Dobrawa, the wife of Mieszko I, and her Bohemian attendants – Mieszko himself was baptised in 966 (see Baptism of Poland).

With the Polish ruler's adoption of Christianity the state received its first missionary bishop, Jordan, who is believed to have made Poznań his seat. The first cathedral was also built in this period. (For more detail about the history and architecture of this building, see Poznań Cathedral.) It is estimated that in the later 10th century the population of the fortified settlement was about 200.

At the start of the 11th century the settlement was rebuilt (and enlarged) after suffering destruction caused by a flood, one of many which would periodically affect Poznań throughout history. In 1038 the invading Bretislaus I, Duke of Bohemia, sacked and burnt the settlement. It was rebuilt under Casimir I the Restorer, but the country's capital was now moved to Kraków, and the Greater Poland settlements of Poznań and Gniezno lost their primary political importance.

== After the founding of the left-bank city ==
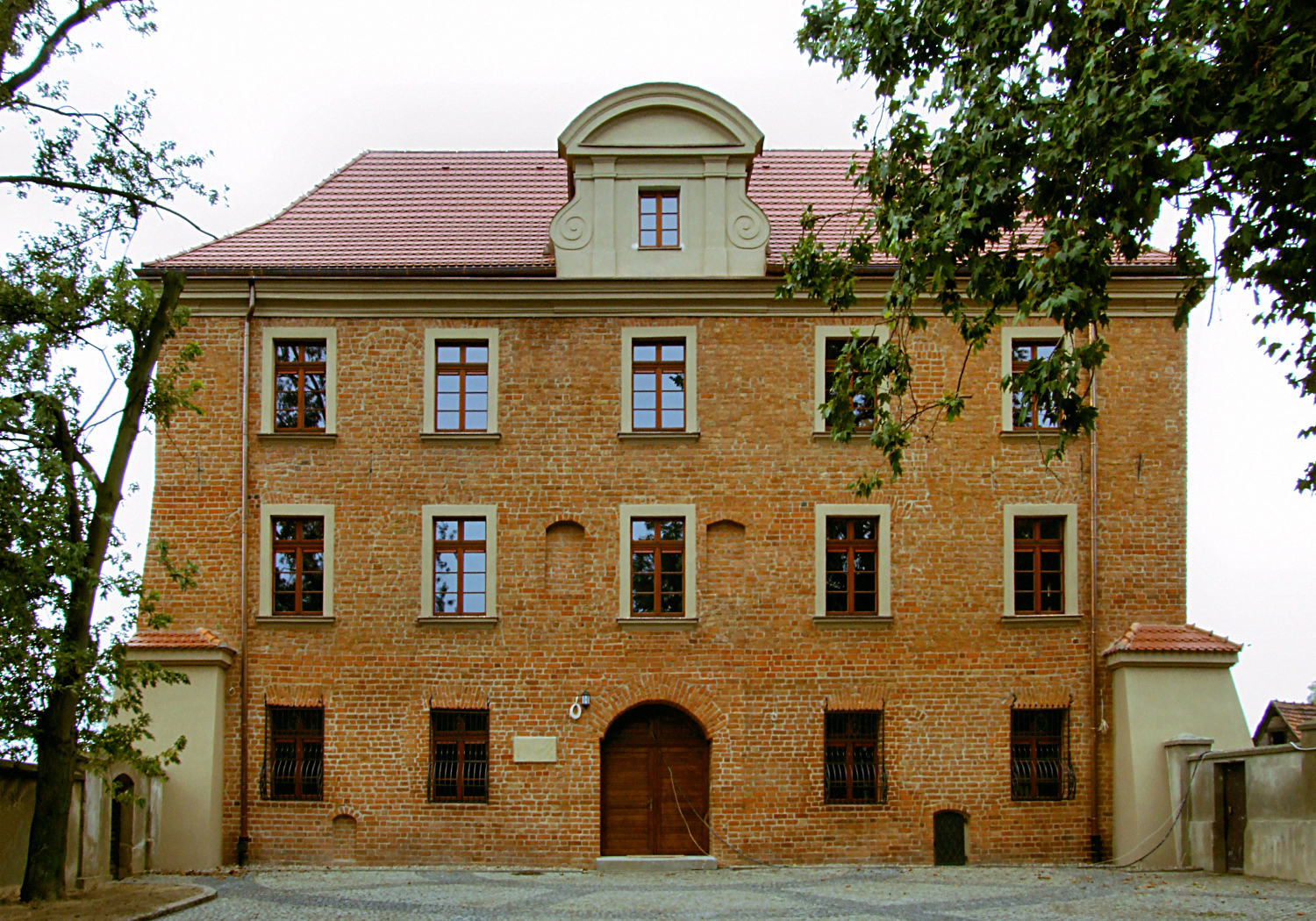
The Lubrański Academy building, now a church archive and museum

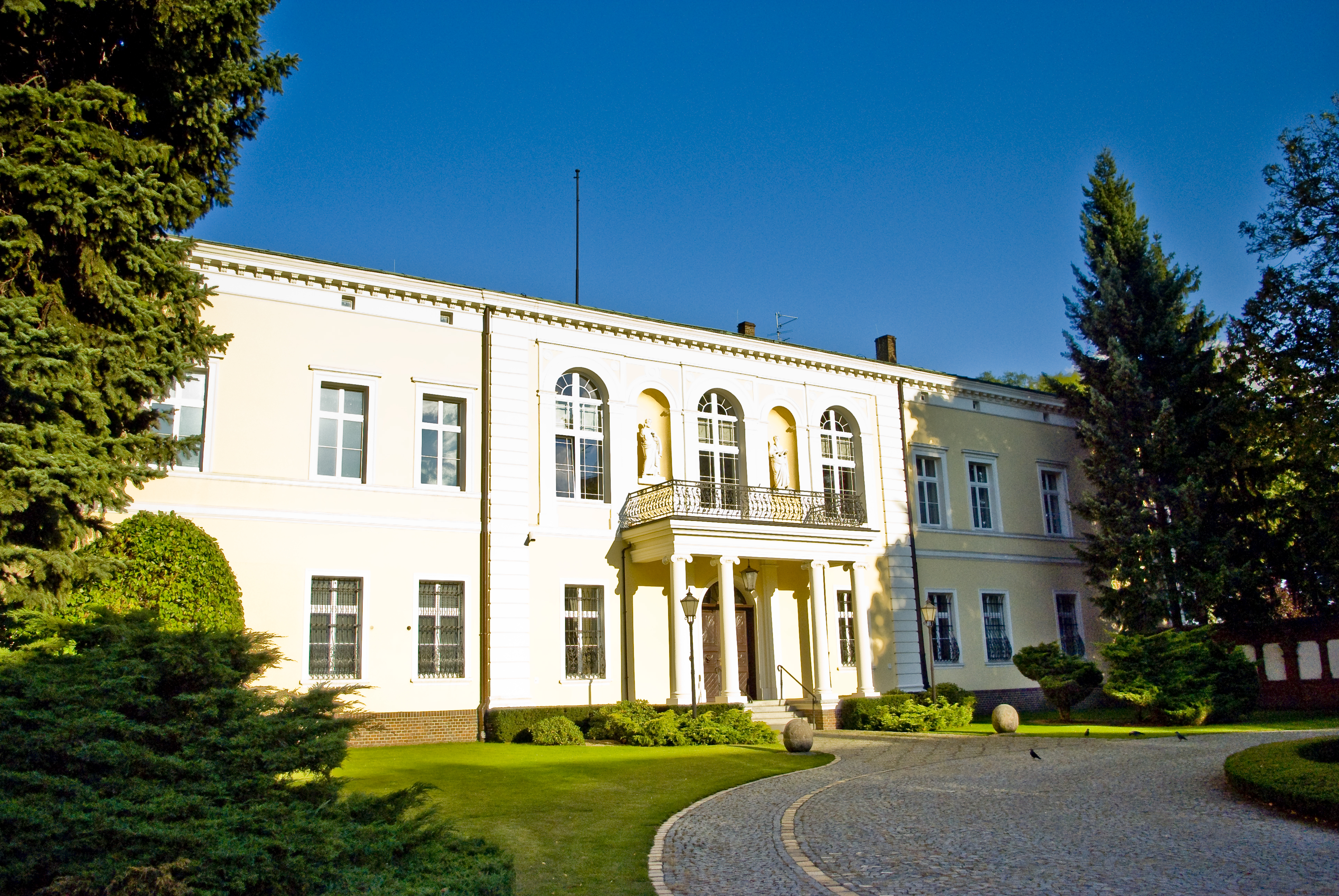
The Archbishop's palace

With the building of the Royal Castle and the walled city of Poznań on the left bank of the Warta in the second half of the 13th century, Ostrów Tumski became the exclusive domain of the bishops. Sometime before 1335 it obtained separate town rights. A separate settlement on the island to the south of the cathedral became known as Zagórze.

Of particular importance for the development of the island was Jan Lubrański, bishop of Poznań from 1498 until his death in 1520 (he was also a lawyer and diplomat). In 1518 he founded the Lubrański Academy, which served as an institution of higher education (but without the right to award degrees) until 1780. Its building was built in 1518–1530 to the west of the cathedral (today the archdiocese museum). Lubrański also built a Psalmodists' House, originally for 12 psalm singers (this building also survives). He also constructed water pipes and paved streets, and in 1504–1512 built defensive walls around the central part of the island. The walls were not as high or imposing as the walls around the left-bank city of Poznań; they were mostly taken down at the start of the 18th century, and the remainder demolished in the 19th century during the building of the Prussian fortifications.

The cathedral, which had been rebuilt in Gothic style in the 14th and 15th centuries, was seriously damaged by a fire in 1622, after which it was rebuilt in Baroque style. After another major fire in 1772, rebuilding was carried out in Neoclassical style.

The Poznań region was taken over by Prussia in the Second Partition of Poland of 1793. According to figures compiled in the following year, the population of Ostrów Tumski at that time was 304. In 1800 Ostrów Tumski, as well as other suburbs, were officially incorporated into the city of Poznań (Posen).

In the 19th century, the Prussian authorities aimed to make Poznań into a fortress city by surrounding it with defensive fortifications; the Warta and Cybina rivers played an important part in these plans. Weirs were built on either side of Ostrów Tumski, and forts were also built on the island itself. The course of the Cybina was altered to provide increased protection for the fortifications, resulting in its joining the Warta further north than previously. For details of these works, see Festung Posen. Unlike the majority of the fortifications of left-bank Poznań, those on Ostrów Tumski were not demolished at the start of the 20th century and mostly survived until the 1950s. Still in existence are the remains of Fort Roon on the site of the cogeneration plant in the north of the island, as well those of the wall and western bridgehead of Dom Schleuse ("Cathedral Lock") north-east of the cathedral.

Various fortifications have therefore been built on Ostrów Tumski: those of the 10th-century settlement, those built by Lubrański in the early 16th century, and the 19th-century Prussian fortifications (which also included water defences). The railway across the island was originally a section of the line from Poznań to Bydgoszcz which opened in 1872; it now also carries trains running on the lines to Warsaw and Wągrowiec.

== Since the Second World War ==
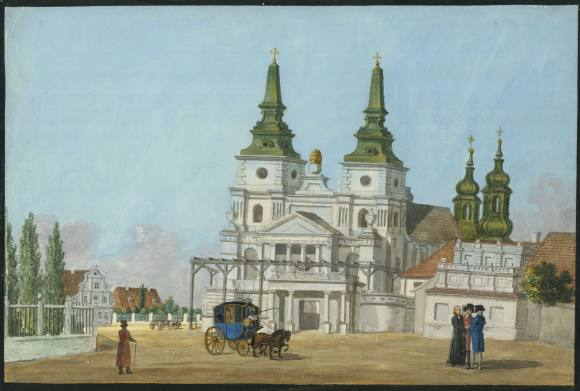
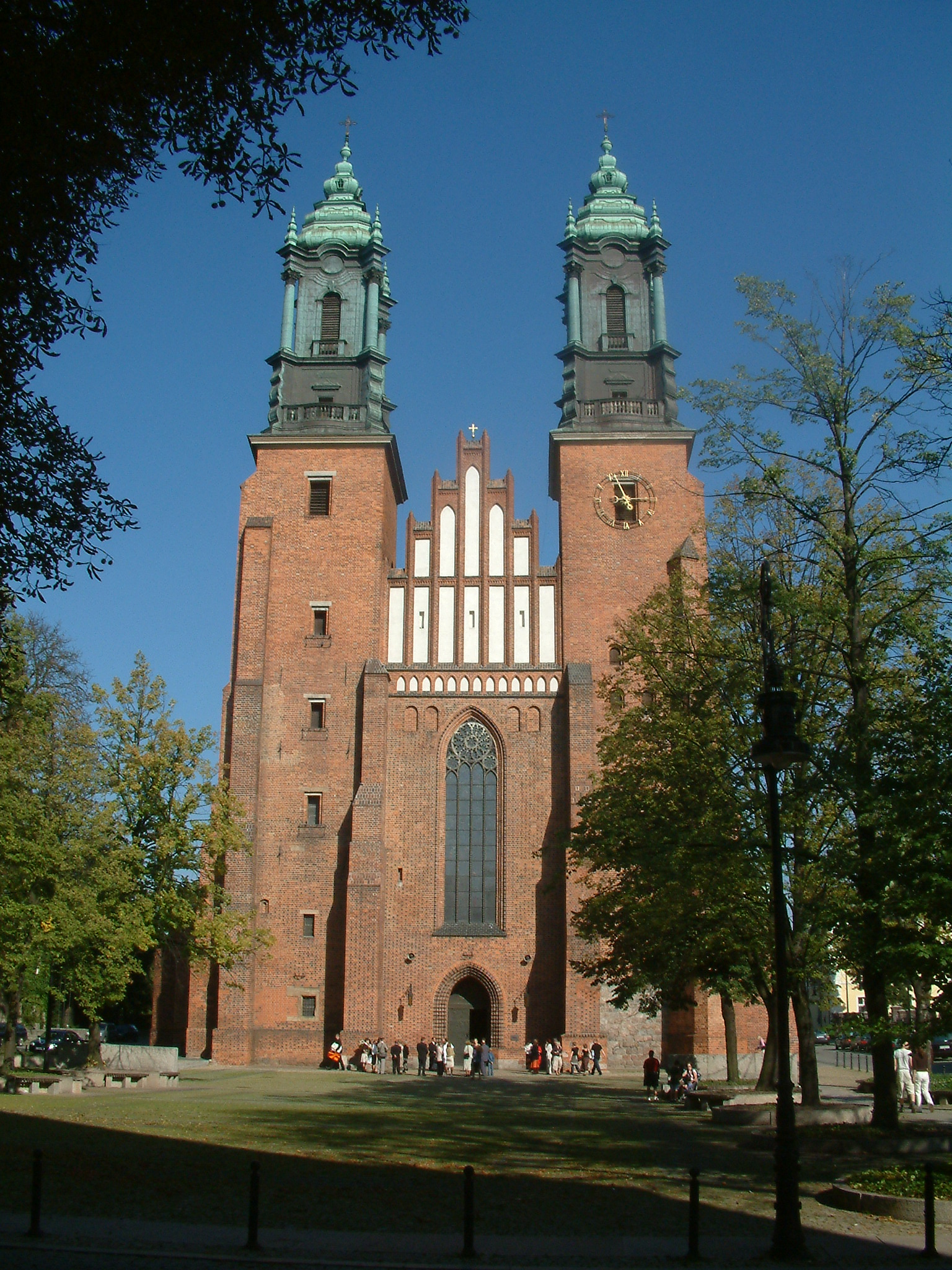
Poznań's cathedral in 1798 (showing its pre-1945 façade), and as it is today

Ostrów Tumski suffered damage in the Battle of Poznań (1945), when the Red Army captured the city from its Nazi German occupiers. Ostrów Tumski itself fell on 16 February, seven days before the final capitulation of the German forces in the city. The most damage was suffered by the cathedral, which was rebuilt after the war. It was decided to rebuild it in the older Gothic style, rather than in the Baroque and Neoclassical styles which had characterized the building since its previous rebuildings after 1622 and 1772.

By this time Ostrów Tumski was no longer, in fact, an island; the Berdychowo Dam blocked the stream of the Warta which had once flowed between Ostrów Tumski and Chwaliszewo (this now served as a flood relief channel), as well as the stream between the Warta and Cybina which had formed the island's south-eastern edge. However work carried out in the 1960s made Ostrów Tumski into a true island, as it remains today – the main stream of the Warta was diverted to flow in the channel east of Chwaliszewo (the previous main stream being filled in), and a second branch of the Warta was created to connect with the Cybina. Also a new main road was built from east to west across the island just south of the cathedral, connecting to the city center to the west via the Bolesław Chrobry Bridge, and to Śródka to the east via the Mieszko I Bridge.

On 7 December 2007, the Bishop Jordan Bridge was opened to provide another crossing, for pedestrians only, between Ostrów Tumski and Śródka (in the place where the bridge between those districts had previously existed until 1969). The Poznań tourist trail called the Royal-Imperial Route passes through Ostrów Tumski via this bridge.

Ostrów Tumski today contains the cathedral and associated ecclesiastic buildings in the central part of the island, the residential neighborhood of Zagórze to the south (including an estate of communal houses dating from the 1920s), and a cogeneration plant and other industrial areas in the north. Apart from the bridges already mentioned, there is also a road bridge connecting to the northern part of the island from the east, and rail bridges carrying Poznań's main eastbound railway line, which passes across the northern part of the island.

== Buildings of interest ==
Buildings of interest in the historic central part of Ostrów Tumski include:

- Poznań Cathedral (see separate article).
- The archbishop's palace, with the adjoining curia building and former presbytery. These buildings date from the 14th and 15th centuries, and in their present form from the 19th.
- The Church of the Most Holy Virgin Mary, built in the 15th century, a well-preserved Gothic building. Archaeological work carried out since 1999 has uncovered the remains of the original ducal palace and chapel (the oldest known place of Christian worship in Poland) on the site now occupied by the church.
- The Psalmodists' House, originally built by Lubrański in the early 16th century.
- The Lubrański Academy building, now used as the archives and museum of the archdiocese.
- The seminary buildings, dating from the late 19th century (new buildings were added in 2003). These are situated in Zagórze, to the south of the main road crossing the island. The seminary was the scene of a major scandal in 2002, when Poznań's archbishop resigned his post following allegations that he had sexually abused clerics there. Another seminary, with more modern buildings, stands north of the main group of buildings around the cathedral.

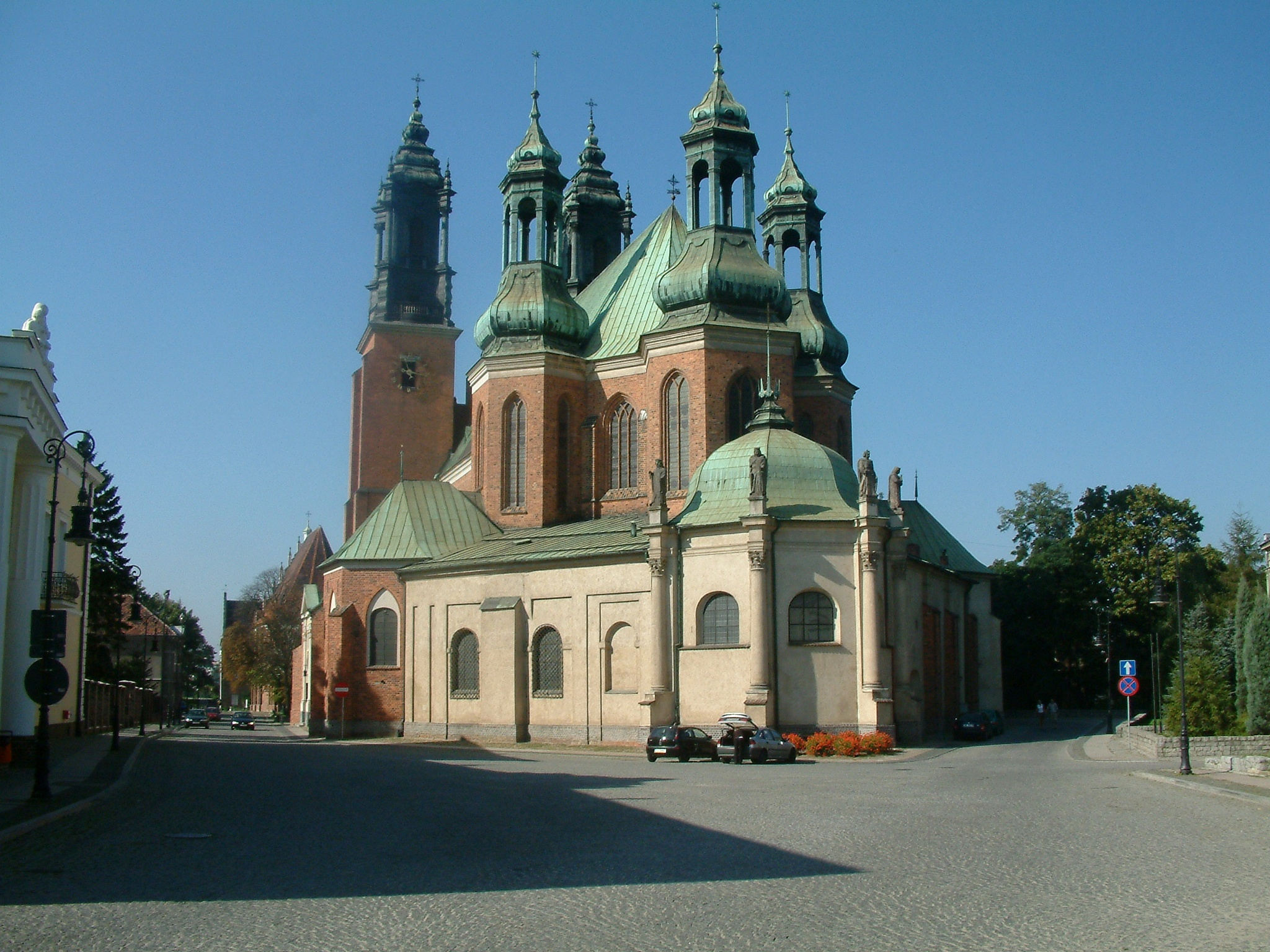
Eastern view of the cathedral

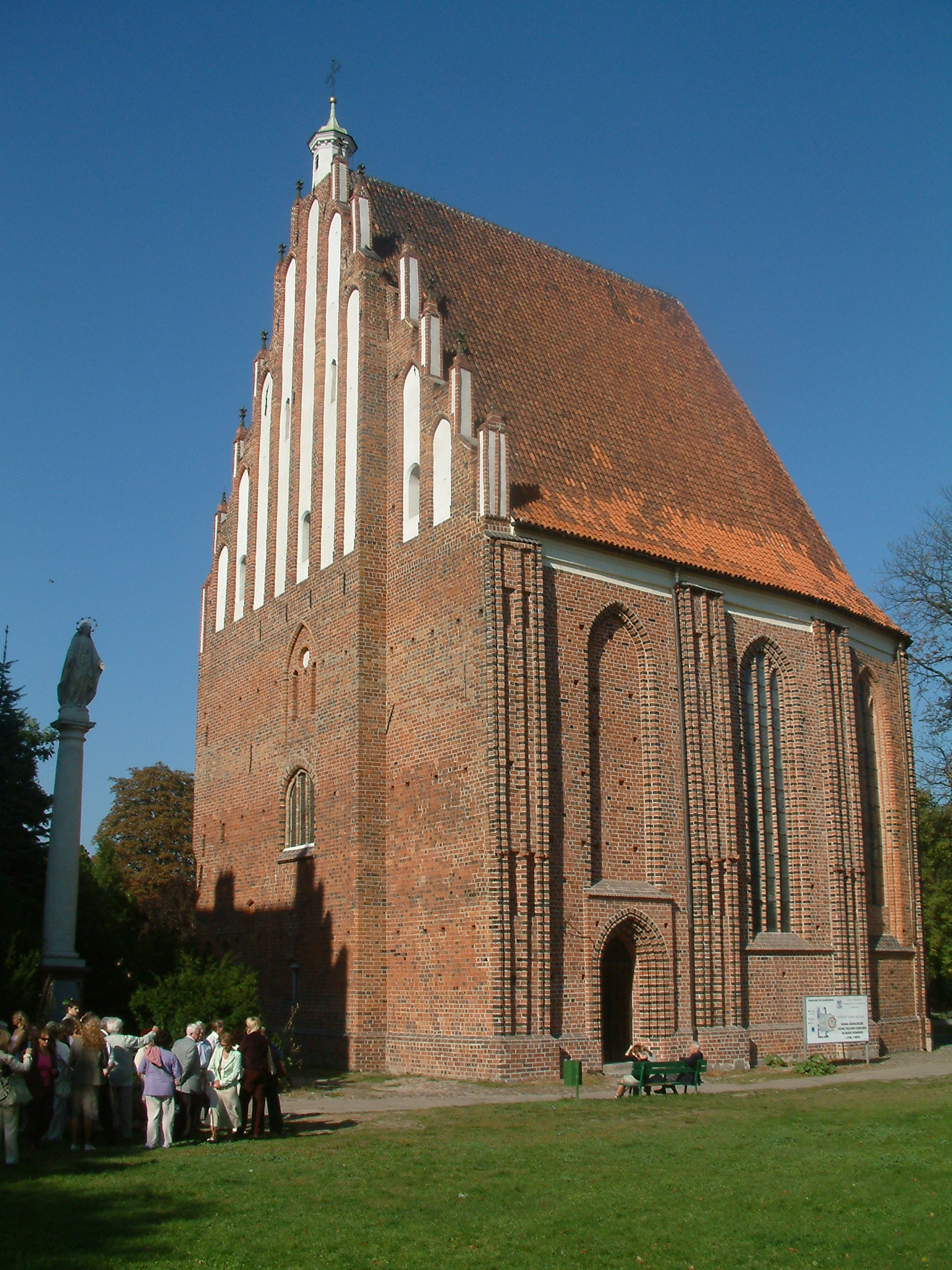
Church of the Most Holy Virgin Mary

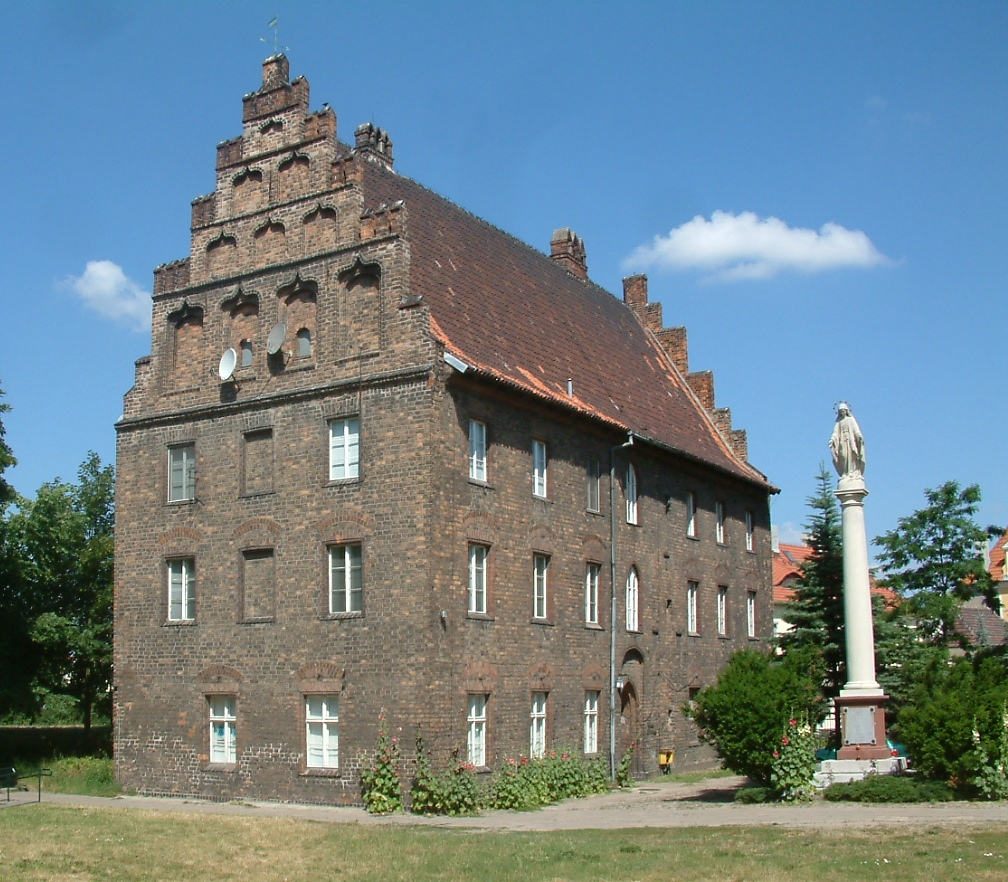
Psalmodists' House

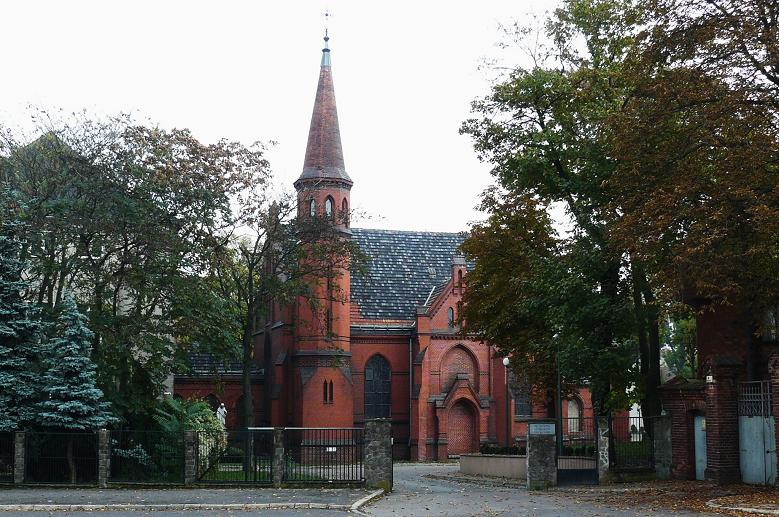
Church on the seminary site in Zagórze

== See also ==
- Ostrów Tumski, Wrocław
- History of Poznań
- Poznań Fortress
- Śródka, Poznań
