= Ostrów Tumski =

Ostrów Tumski (originally meaning "cathedral island") may refer to the following city quarters in Poland:

- Ostrów Tumski, Poznań
- Ostrów Tumski, Wrocław
- Ostrów Tumski, Głogów
