= Jan Lubrański =

Polish bishop

- Bishop of Płock; Bishop of Poznań
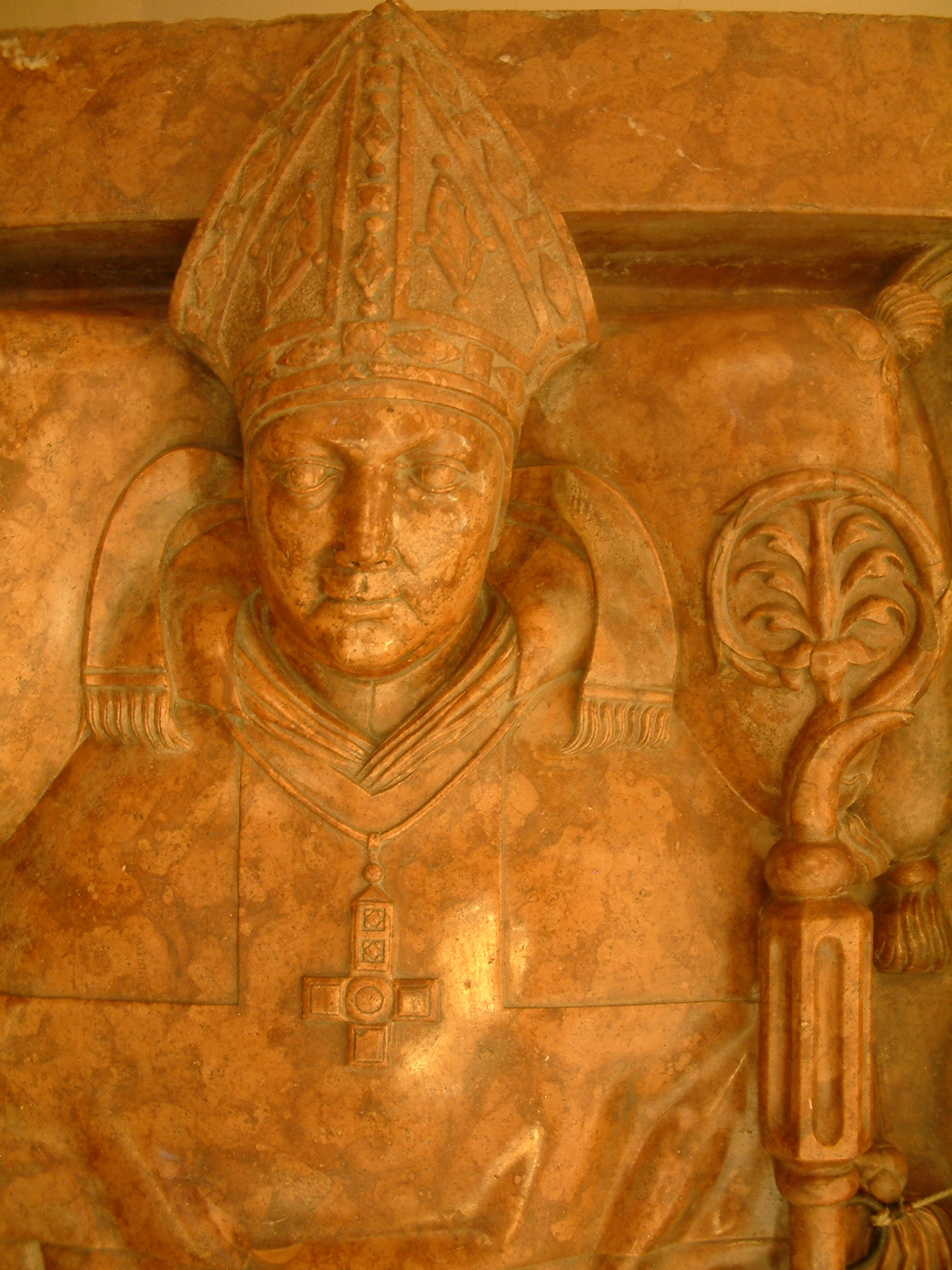
- Tomb of Jan Lubrański
- Church: Roman Catholic
- Diocese: Diocese of Poznań
- In office: 1498–1520
- Predecessor: Uriel Górka
- Successor: Piotr Tomicki

Personal details
- Born: 1456
- Died: 22 May 1520 (aged 63–64) Buk
- Buried: Poznań Cathedral
- Occupation: bishop, diplomat
- Coat of arms

Jan Lubrański (1456 – 22 May 1520) was a Polish bishop, politician and diplomat. His coat of arms was Godziemba.

== Information ==
Lubrański was bishop of Płock between 1497 and 1498 and bishop of Poznań since 1498, founder of many churches in his dioceses, initiator of the reconstruction of the Poznań cathedral. As a bishop he was automatically a senator, close collaborator of the Polish kings, he was frequently used as a diplomat. In 1519 he founded a college in Poznań, which is named Lubrański Academy in his memory.

== Bibliography ==
- Antoni Gąsiorowski, Jerzy Topolski: Wielkopolski słownik biograficzny, Warszawa-Poznań 1983, PWN ISBN 83-01-02722-3
- Jan Pakulski, Krąg rodzinny biskupa Jana Lubrańskiego, Kronika Miasta Poznania, 1999, 2, s. 28–43. ISSN 0137-3552

Catholic Church titles
| Preceded by Piotr z Chodkowa | Bishop of Płock; 1498 | Succeeded by Wincenty Przerębski |
