= Falanta =

Polish bishop

Falenta, also known as Falęta, Falanta or Walenty (died after 22 May 1267) was a Polish Catholic priest, dean of the Gniezno chapter from 1262, and in 1265-1267 the Bishop of Poznan.

After the death of the bishop of Poznan Bogufał from Czerlin (December 1264), the Poznań chapter appointed his successor, the provost of Poznań, Pietrzyk on January 25, 1265. However, the Archbishop of Gniezno, Janusz, refused to approve the election and tried to impose his candidate, the dean of Gniezno, Falenta, who had the support of the Duke of Gniezno-Kalisz, Bolesław the Pious.

Under pressure from Archbishop Pietrzyk, he resigned himself. The chapter took in his place the Archdeacon John, but Janusz also rejected this candidacy and consecrated Falenta to the Bishopric of Poznań. Then the chapter appealed to the Pope. Through the bishop of Wroclaw, Tomasz Falenta, he was called to appear in person at the curia, which he submitted to papal confirmation. After recognizing the case, Pope Clement IV in the bull of May 22, 1267 annulled all previous candidacies and appointed one of his chaplains, Mikołaj, to whom he also gave the episcopal consecration to the post of the bishop of Poznań. However, in the bullet against Falenty, the Pope used the wording venerabil fratrem nostrum V. episcopum quondam Poznaniensem, which suggests that he acknowledged the validity of his consecration.

The fate of Falenty is unknown. He seems to have returned to the post of dean of Gniezno. The date of his death is also unknown.
