= Jan of Lutogniew =

Polish Catholic priest

Doliwa coat of arms

Jan V of Lutogniew (died 14 February 1374) was a Polish Catholic priest, and Bishop of Poznań from 1354 to 1376.

His family were from the Doliwa coat of arms.

He was canon of Wrocław, then Poznań, Gniezno and Srem. From 1355, he was a Bishop of Poznań. He was considered a good host. He conducted the wedding of Casimir III the Great and Jadwiga Żagańska. After the king's death, he supported Andegawen against the majority of the bishops and inhabitants in Wielkopolska.

He was buried in Poznań Cathedral.
