= Heinrich von Siegburg =

Twelfth-century Bishop of Poznań

Heinrich von Siegburg was a twelfth century Bishop of Poznań in Poland, he was little known for his career or episcopal work but was active under the rule of Bolesław III Wrymouth.

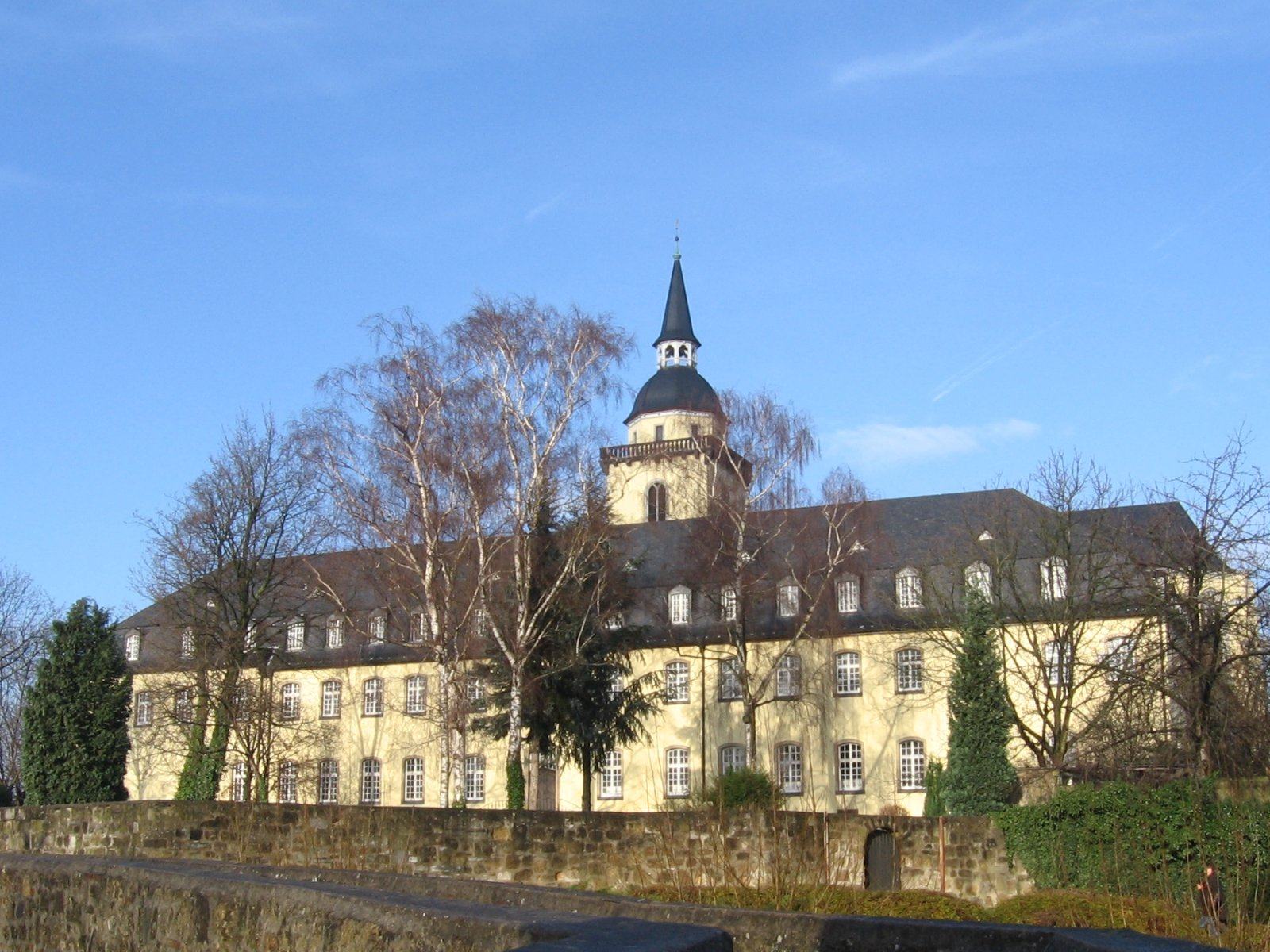
Michaelsberg Abbey

A German, his home monastery was Michaelsberg Abbey, Siegburg, where he was for a time chaplain to Anno II, Archbishop of Cologne. The appointment of a German bishop signifies the influence of the Holy Roman Empire and its clergy on the Polish Church, a reflection of Poland's integration into the broader Latin Christian world..

Heinrich von Siegburg played a role in introducing Western ecclesiastical reforms and practices into Poland during a time of cultural transformation. His connections to Archbishop Anno II and the Michaelsberg Abbey provided him with a rich background in reformist theology and monastic traditions.

According to Gerard Labuda he is the "abbot" in the Life of Saint Henry who was familiar with Otto of Bamberg. At any rate Heinrich arrived in Poland from Germany with Otto about 1080 and became Bishop of Poznań in 1103.

Heinrich died on 8 July in either 1105 or 1109.

Religious titles
Preceded by Eckhard	Bishop of Poznań; 1103–1109	Succeeded by Paweł
