= Ederam (bishop of Poznań) =

Polish Catholic bishop

Ederam, was probably a bishop of Poznań from 1030 until his death some time before 1049.

== Career ==
In the obituaries of the monasteries in Weltenburg and of St. Emmeram in Regensburg he is styled as episcopus de Polonia, that is a bishop of the Polish diocese, most likely of Poznań. They record his death on 29 November of an unknown year.

Kętrzyński and Abraham date his time in Poznan as the end of the 11th or beginning of the 12th century, and according to Tadeusz Wojciechowski, he travelled to Poland with Judith the second wife of Władysław Herman. This claim is based on close relationships Judith had with the monastery in Weltenbergu. However, research on obituary from Regensburg has shown that the notice about his death had been inserted into obituary before the year 1049.

His time in the Diocese of Poznań was during a period of pagan reaction (c. 1031AD) and the invasion Of Bretislaus in 1038AD. It was due to these two events that Diocese of Poznan ceased to exist de facto.

== Bibliography ==
Religious titles
Preceded by Romanus	Archbishop of Poznań; 1030?-before 1049	Succeeded by Franko
