= Paluka =

Polku, also known as Paluka, is a village in Howmeh Rural District of the Central District in Rasht County, Gilan province, Iran.

Paluka may also refer to:

- Gret Palucca, born Paluka (1902–1993), German dance teacher
- Wojciech Pałuka (died 1355), Roman Catholic priest from Poland
