= Andrzej Szołdrski =

Polish nobleman and Roman Catholic priest

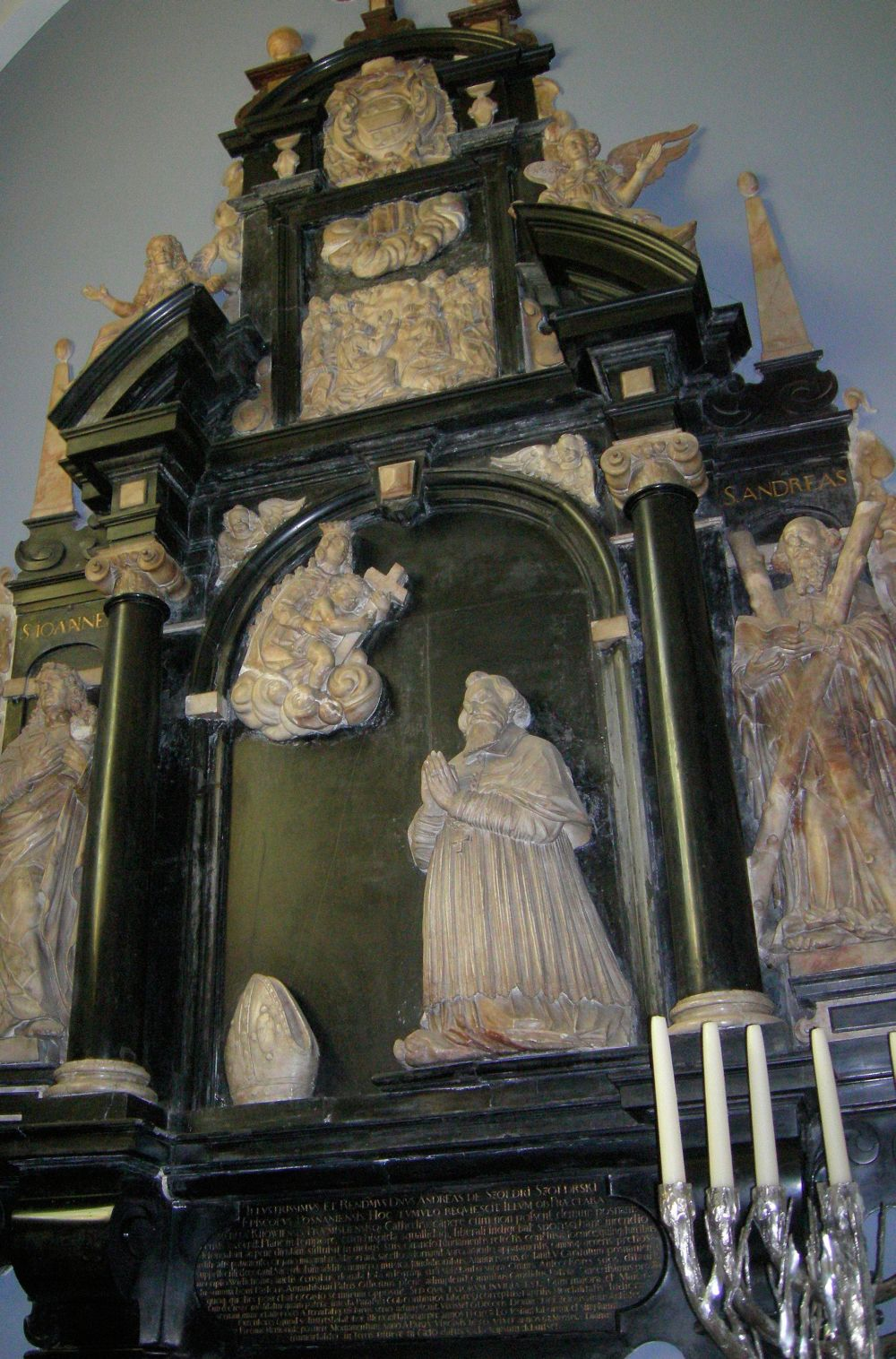
Tomb of bishop Andrzej Szołdrski - cathedral of Poznan.

Andrzej Szołdrski (c. 1583–1650) of Łodzia coat of arms was a Polish nobleman and Roman Catholic priest. Son of Stanisław Szołdrski, owner of Czempiń, and Małgorzata Manicka. He studied at Jesuit school in Poznań. According to some sources, he served as bishop of Kijów (Kiev) from February 1633 to 1635 and apostolican administrator of Kraków's diocese. He became Bishop of Przemyśl in 1635 (August–October), then elected a bishop of Poznań in fall 1636. Died on 1 April 1650.

He was the sponsor of the reconstruction of the Cathedral of Poznań after the fire in 1622, and he was buried there after his death.
