= Gerward =

Gerward may refer to:

- Gerward, author of the 9th-century Annales Xantenses
- Gerward (bishop of Poznań) (c. 1187)
- Gerward (bishop of Włocławek) (died 1323)
