= Andrzej of Wiślica =

Andrzej of Wiślica (Polish: Andrzej z Wiślicy, died 1356) was a bishop of Poznań (nominate) and diplomat in the service of Władysław Łokietek and Casimir the Great.

== Career ==
He has many times sent on behalf of Polish kings to the papal curia in Avignon. He held many church dignities, including a canonist from Wrocław (from 1326), from Gniezno (from 1327) and from Kraków (from 1334). In 1347 he was appointed by Pope Clement VI as the Bishop of Poznań, which he did not take over as a result of counteracting King Casimir the Great, unwilling to accept the papal candidates. Therefore, in the following year he was appointed by the Pope a bishop of Schwerin, where he efficiently managed the diocese for the next years.

He was also the protector of the future chronicler Jan of Czarnków, who at his side achieved the first church dignities and fulfilled office and diplomatic tasks.
