= Domarat Grzymała =

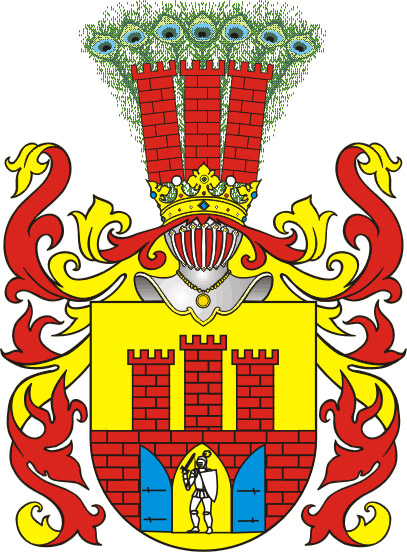
Herb Grzymala.

Domarad Grzymała of the Grzymała coat of arms (?–1324) was bishop of Poznań in the years 1318–1324.

He came from the Wielkopolska Grzymalit family. He supported Władysław Łokietek's resentment to the Kraków throne.

He became bishop in 1318 On 20 January 1320 he took part in his coronation at the Wawel Cathedral. As a supporter of Łokietek, next to the Archbishop of Gniezno, Janisław and the abbot of Mogilno,

He was appointed in 1320 by the Holy See as a judge in the trial between Poland with the Teutonic Order regarding the affiliation of Gdańsk Pomerania.

He was also appointed by the Pope as a judge in a dispute between the Bishop of Kujawy, Gerward and the Knights of Lubiszew. In 1321, together with Archbishop Janisław, he went to the border of the diocese between Gerward and the Bishop of Płock, Florian.
