= Jan of Wysokowce =

Łodzia coat of arms.

Jan Wyszkowic (died 11 March 1285) was bishop of Poznań in the years 1278-1285.

His family were of the Łodzia coat of arms.

From 1240, he was a canon in the Poznań chapter. In the years 1246-57 he was the Chancellor of Przemysł I, and in 1257-63 Chancellor for Bolesław the Pious.

The date of his election to the Poznań Bishopric is unknown, he is certified for the first time on 12 October 1278. In 1283 he was appointed by Pope Martin IV as a mediator in a conflict between Prince Leszek Czarny and the Cracow bishop Paweł of Przemek. In this year, he undertook the mission of transferring the archbishop's pallium to Jakub Świnka and, together with the bishops of Wroclaw, Włocławek and Płock, he gave him priesthood and archbishop consecration. In 1285 he took part in a synod in Łęczyca. He was a close associate of the princes Bolesław the Pious and Przemysl II.

According to Jan Dlugosz he died on 11 March 1286, but already on 17 August 1285 his successor was confirmed, this date should be corrected by one year.
