= Jan II Gerbicz =

13th-century bishop of Poznan

Nałęcz coat of arms.

Jan Gerbicz, or Herbisz was a thirteenth century bishop of Poznan (around 1240–1297).

He came from a noble family of Wielkopolska of the Nałęcz coat of arms. He was the son of Tomasz, castellan of Poznań. He may have had a legal education and probably started his spiritual career from the cantor office in Poznań, which he held in the years 1269–1276. In a document of 6 June 1278, is already called an archdeacon. It is also known that he was a member of the Gniezno chapter.

On 17 August 1285 he was certified for the first time as a Poznań Bishop, but according to Jan Długosz, he received the bishop's consecration from the hands of Archbishop Jakub Świnka only in May 1286 in Ląd. From the beginning of his ministry on the Poznań throne, he was associated with the policy of Przemysł II and Jakub Świnka. Probably, on their initiative, he mediated in a dispute between Prince Henry IV Probus and Tomasz II Zaremba, bishop of Wrocław, who was the co-author of the privilege granted by that same prince to the Wrocław bishopric. In 1295, he took part in the coronation of Przemysl as the king of Poland, and after his murder in 1296, he was a signatory of the Curiatian system, under which Henry III Głogowczyk was to embrace southern Wielkopolska.

He was a good administrator in managing the diocese. He bought several villages in Greater Poland, erected the altar of the Holy Trinity and Saint Jadwiga, founded by Przemysł II, founded the parish churches in Lusów (more precisely in 1288 he established the parish in the existing church from 1244) and Mieszków and collegiate church of St. Jacob in Głuszyna.

In 1297 he obtained numerous estates for the Poznań bishops along with broad immunities in the Duchy of Czersk in Mazovia from Bolesław II Mazowieckie. He invested in the Magdeburg Law of Słupca and Śródka (which was part of the Poznań conurbation) and several villages. He also tried several times to sort out tithing in the diocese. The Gniezno cathedral gave a codex, including the decrees of Gregory IX, which is still in its collections written down on parchment.

The exact date of death is not known, but the document from 17 June 1297 still has his name, while on 20 December that year Andrzej Zaremba sat on the bishop's throne.
