= Jan IV of Kępa =

Łodzia coat of arms.

Jan IV of Kępa (died on 14 April 1346) was bishop of Poznań and author of sequences and antiphons.

== Biography ==
He was born to a knight from Greater Poland named Sędziwoj.

In the pages of history, he first appears in 1319, when as chancellor to the bishop of Poznań, he joined the delegation appointed by the papal judges to present a lawsuit against the Teutonic Knights on the trial between Poland and the Order on Gdańsk Pomerania. It is known that during this process he participated in court sessions in Inowrocław and Brześć Kujawski. He was also listed as one of the witnesses in the 1321 verdict concluding this trial. During the same period he was given the position of Archdeacon of Poznań. In 1331 he was almost killed during the Teutonic military expedition to Greater Poland, when the Order's troops captured Słupca.

In 1335 he was given the title of Bishop of Poznań. As a new bishop, together with Janisław, Archbishop of Gniezno, he challenged the Order to the Roman Curia. During the trial in 1339, which took place in Warsaw between the Order and Poland, the defendant as a witness issued both a negative opinion on the rule of Władysław Łokietek in Pomerania and on the crimes committed by the Teutonic Order. He renounced his claims, like the rest of the bishops, in 1343 at the conclusion of the Peace of Kalisz. In 1344, he started the reconstruction of the Poznań cathedral in the Gothic style. He died on 14 April 1346 and was buried in the cathedral.

== Creative works ==
Several hymns he wrote in honor of the Mother of God and saints survive to the present. Presumably, he also composed an inscription beginning with the words Hic iacet in tumba, engraved on the grave of Bolesław the Brave funded by one of his predecessors on the episcopal throne, Bogufał II. According to accounts, Bishop Jan also played the zither.

=== Musical works ===
- Salve salutis janua (sequence for the celebration of the Assumption of the Virgin Mary in 16 verses),
- In laudem sacro praesuli (sequence in honor of St. Adalbert, with acrostic: Johannes presul Posnaniensis);
- Lux clarescit in via (Marian antiphon)
- De sancto Paulo (sequence: inc: Paule, doctor egregie ...)

== Name ==
Sometimes he is referred to as Jan of Kępa after Jan Długosz, although it is probably an error on the part of the chronicler because in the 14th century Kępa belonged to the Dolivs.
