= Gerward (bishop of Poznań) =

Bishop of Poznań

Gerward was a bishop of Poznan about 1187 though his exact Name and date are unsure. A number of persons are believed to have been Bishop following the tenure of Arnold, including Piotr Łabędź and Świętosław.
