= Stefan (bishop of Poznań) =

Polish bishop

Stefan (died 2 March 1159) was bishop of Poznań in the years 1152–1159.

He is documented in the foundation act of the monastery in Łekno from 1153. The dates of his rule are also given in Annales Lubinensis, the date of death was recorded by the obituary of the abbey in Lubiń.
