= Bogufał II =

Polish bishop

Bogufał II (fl. 1231 – 9 February 1253) also known as Boguchwał II was a thirteenth century Bishop of Poznań in Poland.

The date of his birth is unknown, but according to the medieval chronicler Jan Długosz, he was a member of the Poraj Polish noble family. He was a curator at Poznań in 1231 and in 1242 was made the bishop. He was possibly consecrated bishop on 8 October 1242.

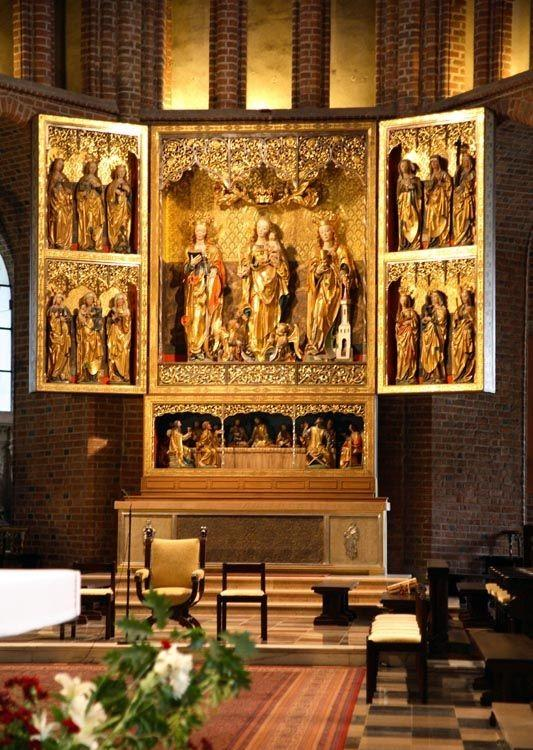
Altar in Cathedral of Poznań

His tenure saw the construction in 1262 of a new sanctuary in the Poznań Cathedral, and in 1253 new hospitals and churches.

He brought the Dominicans to the church of St. Wojciecha, Adalbert and also Saint Marcina in 1246. He also received taxation rights, execution rights and immunities under the Magdeburg law and in 1248 he took part in a Synod in Wrocław.

He was considered to be a scholar obtaining a master's degree and his large library, consisted primarily of collections of Sacred Scripture, that was bequeathed after his death to the library of the cathedral. He is also considered to be the initiator of the Yearbook of Poznań Cathedral and the patron of Baska curator, who wrote The Chronicle of Greater Poland.

In a note from 1249, written in the first person, Bogufał noted for the memory of posterity his prophetic dream, in which a monk supposedly predicted to him the "fulfillment" of Poland's fate in the next 25 years. The text was first entered into the Yearbook of the Poznań chapter, and then transcribed into the Chronicle of Greater Poland, where it is preserved in slightly different, two editions.

He died on 9 February 1253 in Solec, Wielkopolski.

Religious titles
Preceded by Paweł	Archbishop of Poznań; 1242–1253	Succeeded by Piotr
