= Stanisław Dzedziński =

Polish Roman Catholic prelate (died 1573)

Most Reverend Stanisław Dzedziński
- Auxiliary Bishop of Poznań; Titular Bishop of Aenus
- Church: Catholic Church
- Diocese: Diocese of Poznań
- In office: 1568–1573

Orders
- Consecration: 21 Dec 1568 by Otto Truchseß von Waldburg

Personal details
- Died: 1573 Poznań, Poland

Stanisław Dzedziński (died 1573) was a Roman Catholic prelate who served as Auxiliary Bishop of Poznań (1568–1573) and Titular Bishop of Aenus (1568–1573).

== Biography ==
On 3 December 1568, Stanisław Dzedziński was appointed during the papacy of Pope Pius V as Auxiliary Bishop of Poznań and Titular Bishop of Aenus. On 21 December 1568, he was consecrated bishop by Otto Truchseß von Waldburg, Cardinal-Bishop of Albano, with Giulio Antonio Santorio, Archbishop of Santa Severina, and William Chisholm, Bishop of Dunblane, serving as co-consecrators. He served as Auxiliary Bishop of Poznań until his death in 1573.

Catholic Church titles
Preceded by Jacobus Dryaduschki	Titular Bishop of Aenus; 1568–1573	Succeeded by Joannes Wegorzenuski
