= Romanus (bishop of Poznań) =

Polish bishop

Romanus was a Bishop of Poznan, Poland.

He was Bishop from 1012 AD to 1030 AD and is known from the Chronicles of Krakow and he died 1030.

Religious titles
| Preceded by Unger | Archbishop of Poznań; 1012-1030 | Succeeded by Ederam |
