= Jan Doliwa =

14th-century Polish Catholic bishop

Doliwa coat of arms

Jan of the Doliwa (died 17 March 1335) was Bishop of Poznań from 1324 to 1335.

Little is known about his youth. Prior to his appointment as bishop in Poznań he held an office in the Archdiocese of Poznań.

In July 1324, the Poznań chapter elected him as another bishop. This election was approved by Janisław - Archbishop of Gniezno, who made episcopal ordination in the autumn of the same year in Sochaczew. Belonging to the Doliwów family, Jan belonged to the trusted king Władysław Łokietek. In the last months of 1324, Bishop Jan sent food to reinforce Pyzdry, and in June 1325 he belonged to the signatories of a covenant between the king and the West Pomeranian princes against Brandenburg in Nakło. In the same year, Pope John XXII appointed him the conservator of the Owińska Cistercian convent, ordering him also to extort Prince Bolesław III the Spendable to separate the Duchy of Legnica's brother. In February 1326 Jan took part in the synod of the Gniezno metropolis, and in 1329 during Łokietek's stay at the Poznań castle, he belonged to his immediate surroundings.

In March 1331, the bishop, together with the Archbishop of Gniezno and the Cracow bishop, were appointed by the Pope to be the executors of the atonement to be given to the Chełmno bishopric for the losses suffered, and in the event of a refusal they had the right to lay a curse on the order. In July of the same year, the Teutonic invasion ravaged the bishop's estate, destroying Słupca and many villages belonging to the bishop, as well as many other cities in Greater Poland, such as Pyzdry, Środa Wielkopolska and Kostrzyn, where churches were burnt. In the Warsaw trial, the court found that the damage, without the temptation of the temples, amounted to 8,200 silver fines. After the death of Łokietek, the bishop celebrated the coronation mass of Casimir the Great.

During his term of office, the parish church in Krerówo was founded, the estate of the bishops lying in both Greater Poland and Mazovia was merged, and a privilege for millers in the estate of the diocese was issued. The modern bishop calendar of Włocławek described him as a good and generous man, while Jan Długosz showed him in a negative way, accusing him of extravagance and lack of care for those in need.
