= Mikołaj I =

Mikołaj (died 30 March 1278) was a bishop of Poznań in the years 1267-1278.

He came from Silesia. His brothers were Bronisław and Teodoryk. They together inherited Gawrony.

He obtained a master's degree at a Western European university. He was first a custodian and then a Cracow scholastic. In 1262, he was part of a delegation seeking the canonization of Jadwiga Slaska in the papal curia. On May 22, 1267, Pope Clement IV appointed him bishop of Poznań, thus ending a year and a half dispute between the cathedral chapter and Archbishop Janusz for the cast of this diocese. It is known from this bullet that Mikołaj was the papal chaplain, which allows to suppose that after 1262 he was permanently detained in the Roman Curia.

As a bishop he participated in the provincial synod in Sieradz in 1270. Moreover, he appears in two documents dated October 25, 1276 and 1278 (without a date).

The date of his death was recorded in the Lublin obituary. On April 23, 1278, duke Bolesław the Pious recalls him as a dead person.
