= Bogufał III of Czerniejewo =

Poraj coat of arms.

Bogufał III (born?, died on 16/17 December 1264) was bishop of Poznań from 1254.

He was born in Czerlin (some studies claim that he was from Wronczyn) and his family were of the Poraj, coat of arms. He studied at an unspecified Western university, earning a master's degree, which opened the way to his ecclesiastical career.

Around 1221-1222 he was already a canon of Gniezno, in 1232 he was a scholar of Łęczyca, in 1238 he was an Archdeacon of Gniezno, and in the same year he became a canon of Poznań.

In the years 1240-1246 he was the chancellor of the Duke Przemysł I. In 1250 he resigned from the Łęczyca scholasteria, simultaneously occupying the Gniezno provostura.

In 1254 he was elected by the chapter of the Poznań bishop and received the approval of the metropolitan election. On 21 February 1255 he was consecrated in Ląd by the Archbishop of Gniezno, Pełka, assisted by four bishops.

In 1257 he took part in the provincial synod in Łęczyca, he completed the construction of a new presbytery of the Poznań cathedral. He led a secular lifestyle, taking care of enlarging the episcopal estates, and erecting several new parishes.
