= Wojciech Pałuka =

Polish Roman Catholic bishop

Wojciech Pałuka (died 31 May 1355) was a Roman Catholic priest from Poland. Canon in Poznań, Gniezno, Kraków, Płock, Wrocław. Designated bishop of Poznań from 1346 to 1355, consecrated on 28 January 1347, and approved by the pope in 1348. He took part in delineating the Polish-Teutonic border, he also obtained royal privileges for the diocese.
