= Jordan (bishop of Poland) =

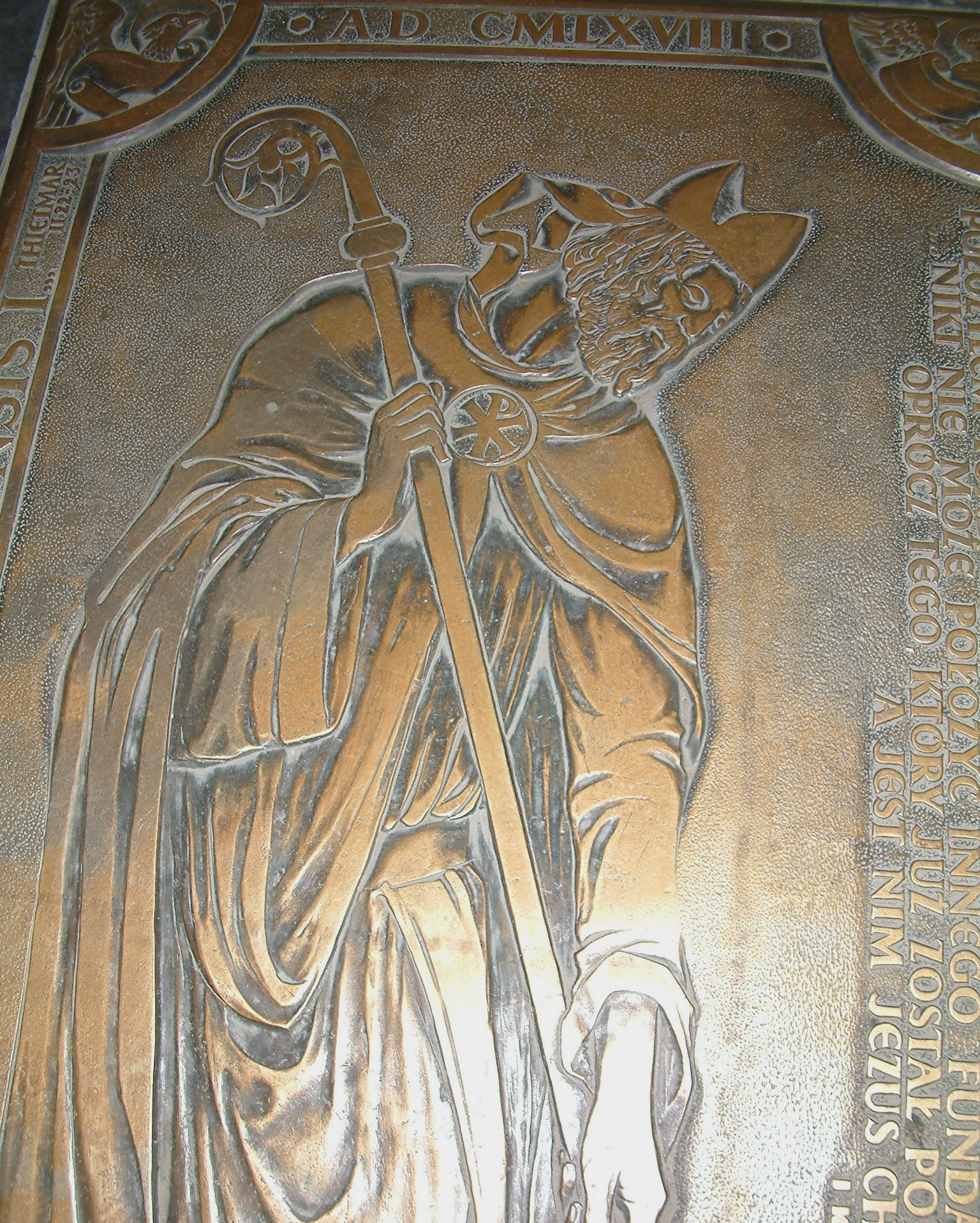
Epitaph of Jordan in Archcathedral Basilica of St. Peter and St. Paul in Poznań

Jordan (died 982 or 984) was the first Bishop of Poland from 968 with his see, most probably, in Poznań. A foreigner, he is considered a saint in the Reformed Catholic Church in Poland.

Most evidence shows that he was a missionary bishop subordinate directly to the Pope. He arrived in the territory of Lechina (the future Poland), probably from Italy or the Rhineland, in 966 with Doubravka of Bohemia to baptise Mieszko I of Poland. After the death of Jordan until 992, the see was either vacant or filled by a bishop of unknown name (more likely the first). From 992 the see was filled by Unger.

== Early life ==
On the basis of his name alone one may conclude that he came from one of the Romance language-speaking countries (Italy, France or Lorraine). Jan Długosz considered him a Roman of the Orsini family; however, he provides no historical support for this. The hypothesis, rejected by Wladyslaw Abraham, about his origin in the Bishopric of Lüttich in the Holy Roman Empire (now Liège in Belgium). Another hypothesis assumes that he could have been an Italian associated with the Patriarchate of Aquileia, which extended its jurisdiction over the Slav peoples in the north-western Balkans. Regardless of nationality, it is likely he had a relationship with the Roman Catholic Diocese of Regensburg, which was subject to Bohemia.

== Episcopal work ==
A reconstruction of Jordan's activities is largely based on guesswork. Some historians believe he was originally a priest accompanying Dobrawa in 966 to Mieszko I, or that he was an auxiliary bishop of the diocese of Regensburg, which was at that time subject to the Kingdom of Bohemia (now the Czech Republic), (this is disputed by some) or a monk sent to the Polish mission directly by the emperor.

=== Dating ===
Polish and Czech annals offer the year 968 as the date of his ordination; some historians (in accordance with Thietmar of Merseburg) believe, however, that it should be moved about a year or two back, which seems to link him directly with the baptism of lives. If we accept his transfer from Magdeburg, in December 968 Jordan was present at the enthronement of the first metropolitan Adalbert of Magdeburg.

=== Location ===
Some have questioned if his base was Poznan at all, either suggesting Gniezno or that he did not have any permanent establishment, but only traveled with the duke's court around the country. About his work as a Polish bishop, we have only a generic relation by Thietmar of Merseburg of his "tireless efforts [which] induced them in word and deed to the cultivation of the Lord's vineyard."

Jordan died approximately 982-984. His immediate successor was probably Unger, though there may have been an unnamed bishop.
