= Benedykt (bishop of Poznań) =

Benedykt (died 10 December 1193/95) was bishop of Poznań in the 12th century.

The exact period of his ministry is not known, his name appears in a private document from around 1192, and Pope Celestyna III's bulla from 9 April 1193. In the bull of this Celestine III, he approved, at Benedykt's request, the foundation of Prince Mieszko the Old and Bishop of Radwan (died 1172) to the Order of Saint John.

It is to him that the obituary memo given by Jan Długosz probably refers, registering on 10 December the death of the bishop of Poznan Benedict (Długosz referred her to an otherwise unknown bishop of that name who allegedly ruled the diocese of Poznań in 1037-1048). The year of death remains unknown, the years 1193 to 1195 come into play.
