= Mrokota =

Polish Catholic bishop and saint

Mrokota (died 1196) was bishop of Poznań.

According to Stanisław Kozierowski, he came from the Leszczyc family. According to other historians he was member of the Grzymala or the Korab family.

Initially he was the chancellor of Casimir the Just (1189), but during the rebellion of the magnates against Kazimierz in 1191 he went to the side of Mieszko the Old. A bishop's nomination was probably a reward from Mieszko for this support. The date of this nomination is unknown (between 1193 and 1196). The only reliable source message about him as the Poznań bishop is the entry in the Cracow chapter of the capital, registering his death in 1196.

== See also ==
- List of saints canonized by Pope Pius XI (Bogumił z Dobrowa)
