= Uriel Górka =

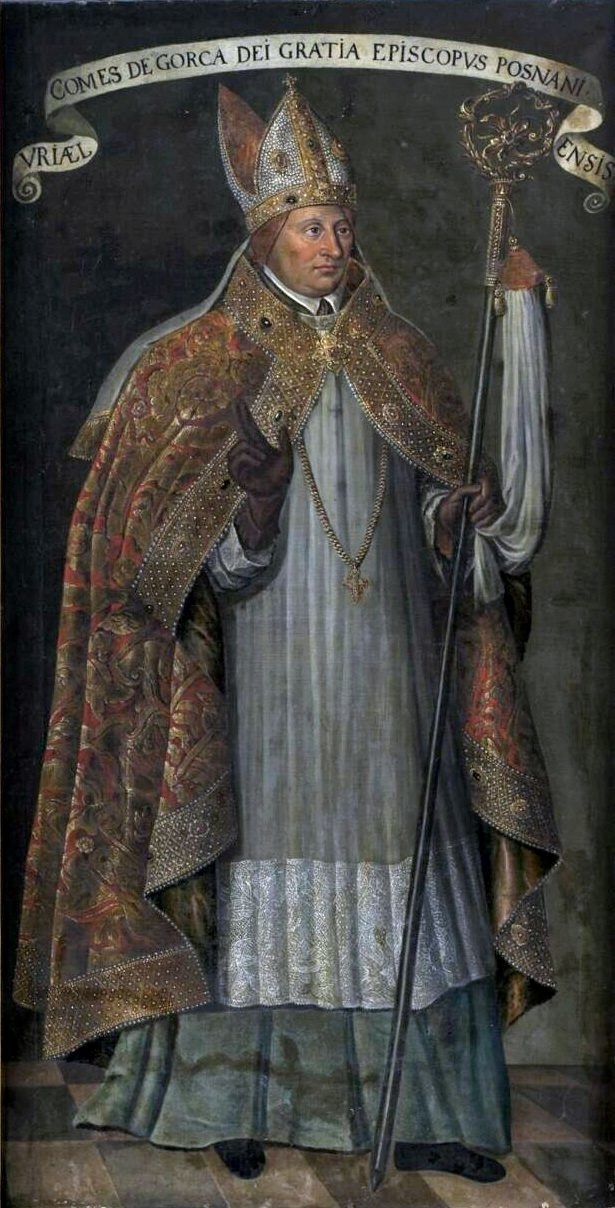
Uriel Górka.

Uriel Górka of the Łodzia coat of arms (born around 1435 - died 21 January 1498) was bishop of Poznań and chancellor of the Crown. He was one of the most powerful men in Poland of his generation.

== Early life ==
He was the son of Łukasz Gorka and Katarzyna Szamotulska. As a child, he was destined for the clergy. In spite of poor health, he studied at the Kraków Academy until 1453, and then in Italy and Germany, to study again in Bologna in 1463. The father tried for him numerous church prebends: in 1449 he became a Poznań canon, in 1453 Gniezno and Łęczyca, in 1467 Płock, Sandomierz and Kraków. In 1454 he received the position of Poznań provost, and in 1468 Gniezno. Such accumulation of dignity in the hands of one person required a special permission from the Roman Curia.

In 1473, thanks to the support of his father, he was appointed royal chancellor, even though he had no previous experience relating to that office. In 1478 he was in Rome as a royal deputy. During this stay, he received from the Pope the office of a papal payments collector for the Archdiocese of Gniezno, which he probably held until 1486. During this period, he established numerous relations with the Western European, and especially Nuremberg, banking houses, and Polish and Italian burgers in Polish cities. In the years 1473 - 1474 he was the administrator of the Archdiocese of Gniezno and, at the request of the king, he called a provincial synod to Łęczyca, who established the payment obligations of the clergy to the state.

After the death of Andrzej Bniński in 1479, he took the Poznań bishopric promised to him, while at the same time resigning from the office of the Crown Chancellor. His period of office on the bishop's throne in Poznan is poorly documented, but it is known that he was patron of the artists. He also brought records from Vischer's factory to his and his father's graves. He also ordered a service at the Albrecht Dürer plant.

He witnessed the release of the Piotrków Privilege in 1496.

In his estates he tried to grow vines. His only heir was his nephew, Łukasz II Górka. He died during a curative stay in Karlovy Vary on 21 January 1498.
