= Arnold I (bishop of Poznań) =

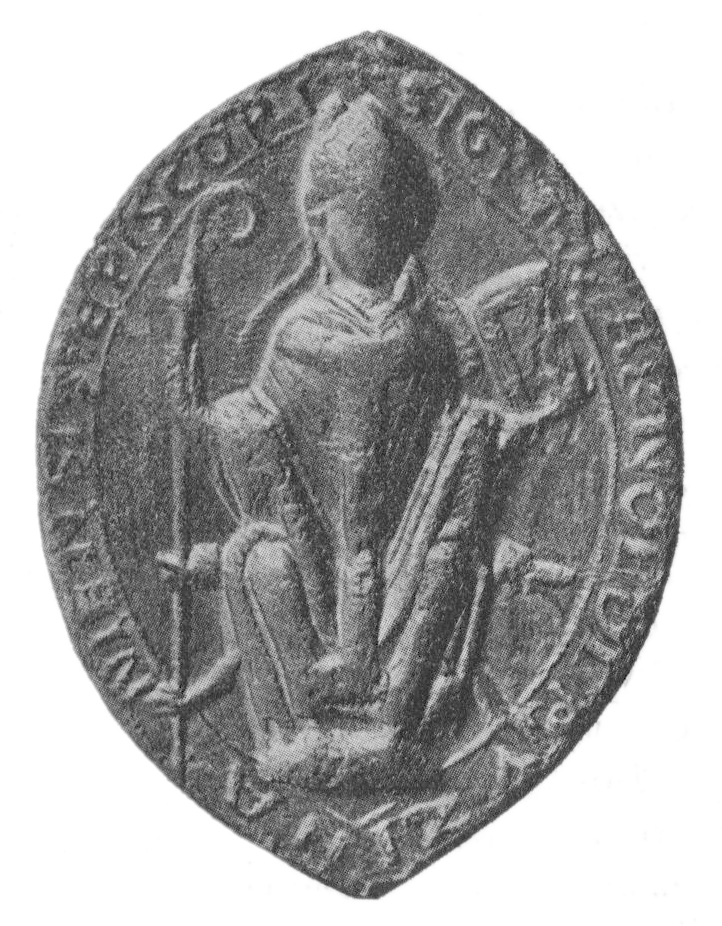
Bishop Arnolda II

Arnold (died January 15, 1211) was a Catholic bishop.

Arnold, from 1196 (the date of his predecessor, bishop Mrokota's, death) was a Poznań bishop. However, he was mentioned for the first time only in the bull of Pope Innocent III of August 2, 1201.

From 1206 Arnold II was a follower of Prince Władysław Laskonogi in his dispute with the Archbishop of Gniezno, Henryk Kietlicz, who led a hostile reform of a part of the clergy. Ignoring the interdict that the archbishop imposed on his diocese, he continued to give religious services to the cursed prince. It ended with an excommunication on Arnold, approved by a papal bull on January 10, 1207. He took part in the congress of princes in Głogów at Christmas 1208, where he removed church punishments. He took part in 1210 at the congress in Borzykowa.

He died on January 15, 1211.
