= Paweł (bishop of Poznań) =

Polish bishop

Paweł, was a bishop of Poznań from the 12th century.

He is known from the Chronicle of Gallus Anonymus. Gall Anonym dedicated his first and second part of this chronicle, which means that he certainly held his office around 1112/1113. The date of his taking up the diocese and the date of death remain unknown. However, if we assume that Gall in the dedication of his first book mentioned four Polish bishops in the order of seniority counted from consecration, then Paul had to become a bishop before 1110. Perhaps he became a bishop as a result of Gwalon's legacy in 1103, for it is known that Gwalon has filed two Polish bishops from office.
