= Lubrański Academy =

University college in Poznań

Coordinates: 52°24′44.78″N 16°56′48.67″E

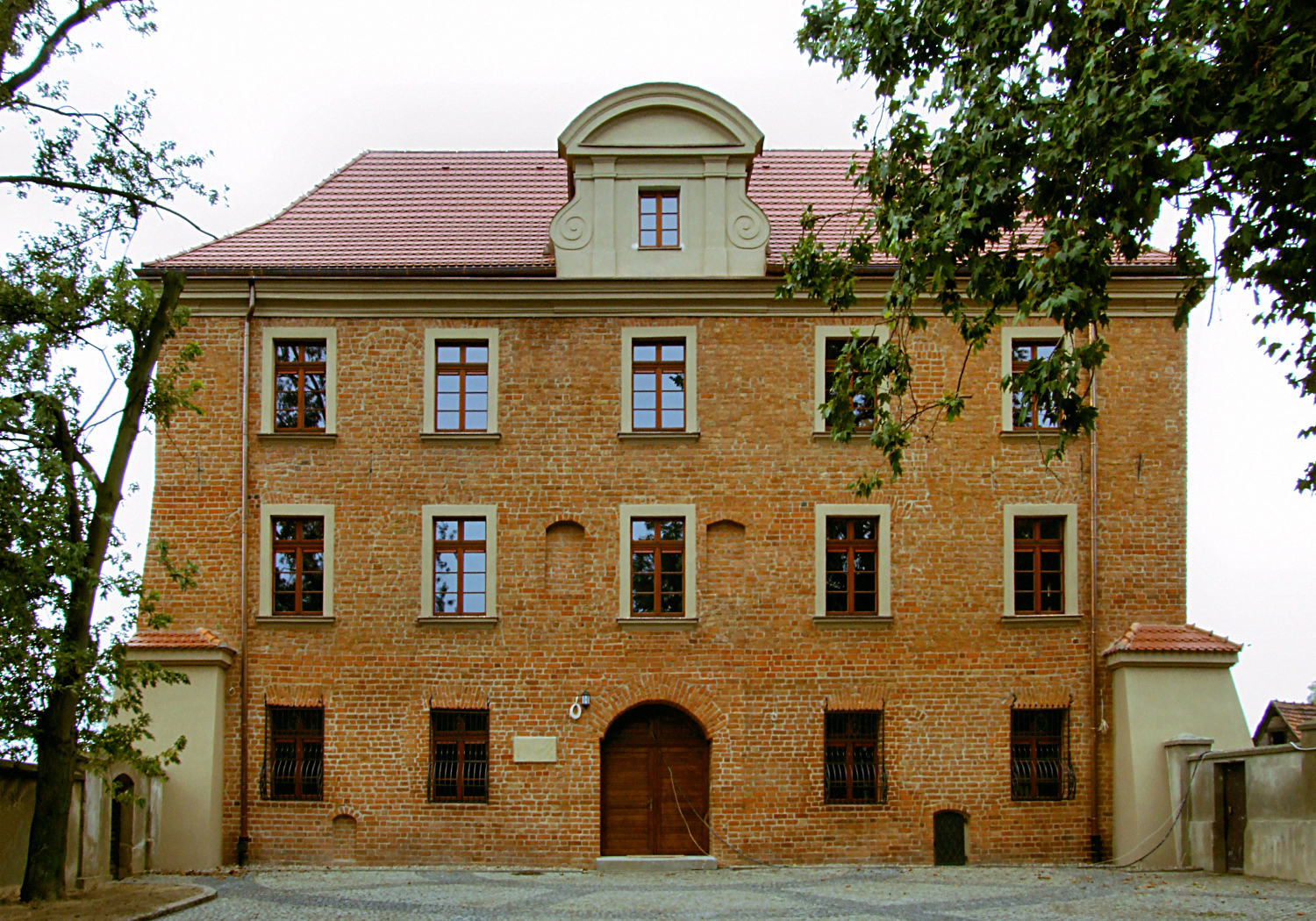
Lubrański Academy

The Lubrański Academy (Polish: Akademia Lubrańskiego; Latin: Collegium Lubranscianum) was a university college that was established in 1518 in Poznań by Bishop Jan Lubrański. It was the first school with university aspirations in Poznań (in fact it was not a full university).

== History ==
The academy's first rector was the Poznań humanist Tomasz Bederman. Another prominent lecturer was Grzegorz of Szamotuły.

The Lubrański Academy aimed at independence from the Kraków Academy but was finally transformed into a faculty of the Kraków Academy. Before that the Lubrański Academy comprised six schools: of philosophy, logic, mathematics, languages (Latin, Greek), law, and rhetoric.

The academy's main building was remodeled in the 17th and 18th centuries.

In 1780 the academy was merged with the Jesuit Collegium Posnaniae.

Today the Lubrański Academy's building holds the museum of the Roman Catholic Archdiocese of Poznań.

== Alumni ==
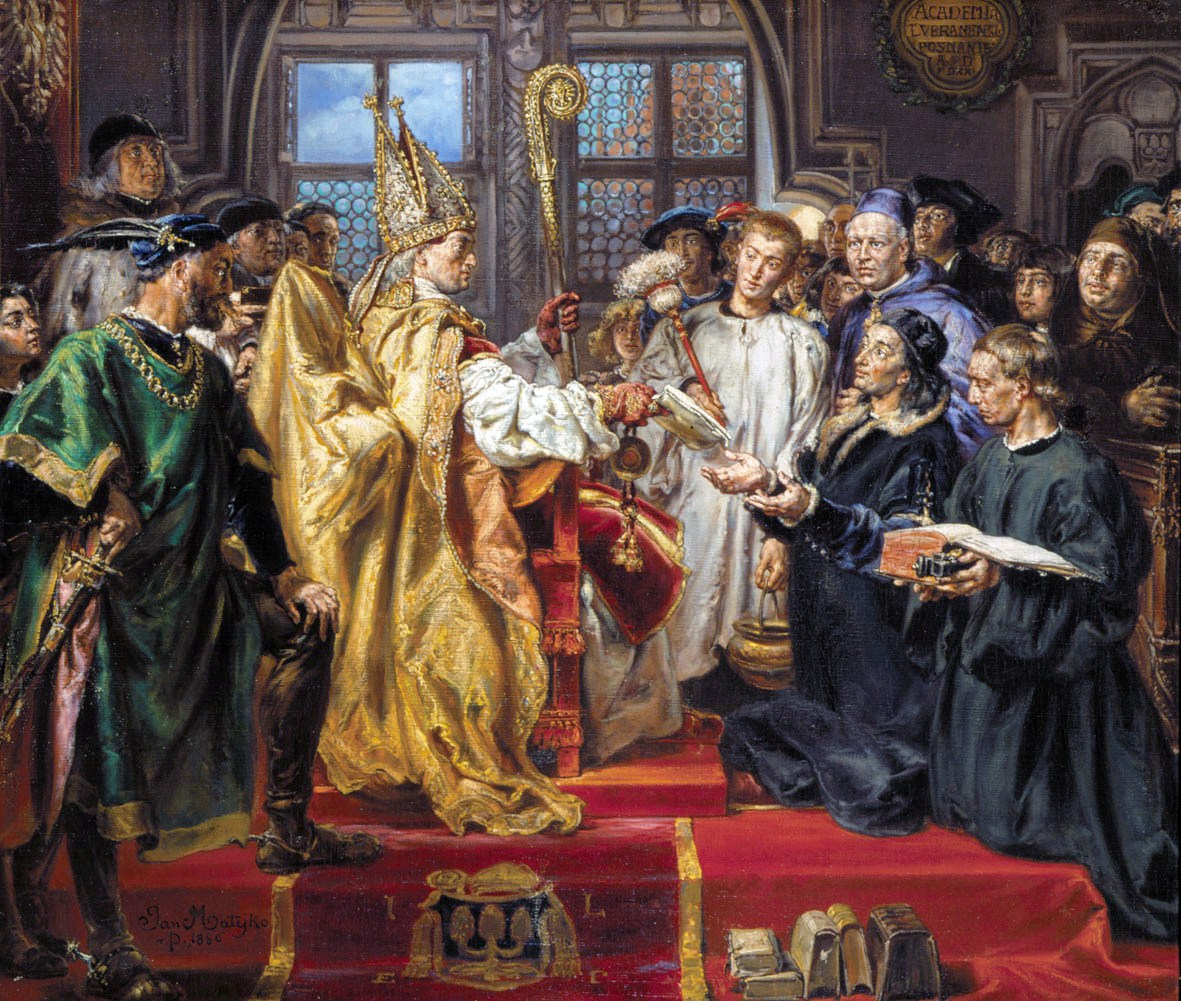
Founding of the Lubrański Academy in Poznań, by Matejko

- Józef Struś – scientist, mayor of Poznań.
- Klemens Janicki – poet
- Łukasz Opaliński – poet and writer
- Jan Śniadecki – astronomer and polymath

== See also ==
- Zamojski Academy
