= Jan of Czarnków =

Nałęcz III coat of arms

Jan(ko) of Czarnków (Polish: Jan(ko) z Czarnkowa) (ca. 1320–1387), of Nałęcz coat of arms, was a Polish chronicler, Deputy Chancellor of the Crown and Archdeacon of Gniezno.

He started his career as a diplomat in service of one of Polish bishops and later joined the Royal Chancellery. From 1366 to 1371 he was the Deputy Chancellor. After the death of Casimir III the Great in 1370, Janko supported Casimir IV of Pomerania against Louis I of Hungary. Losing the struggle with Angevin dynasty supporters, he was exiled in 1371, but returned in 1375.

In the years 1377–1386 he wrote a chronicle about the years 1370–1384 and events he witnessed. Some historians consider him the author of the Chronicle of Greater Poland. The chronicle, now devoid of beginning and end, covers the period between 1370 and 1384. It has the characteristics of both a diary and an anti-Angevin political pamphlet.
