= Poznań Cathedral =

Roman Catholic church in Poznań, Poland that is the oldest cathedral in Poland

Sts. Apostles Peter and Paul Archcathedral Basilica
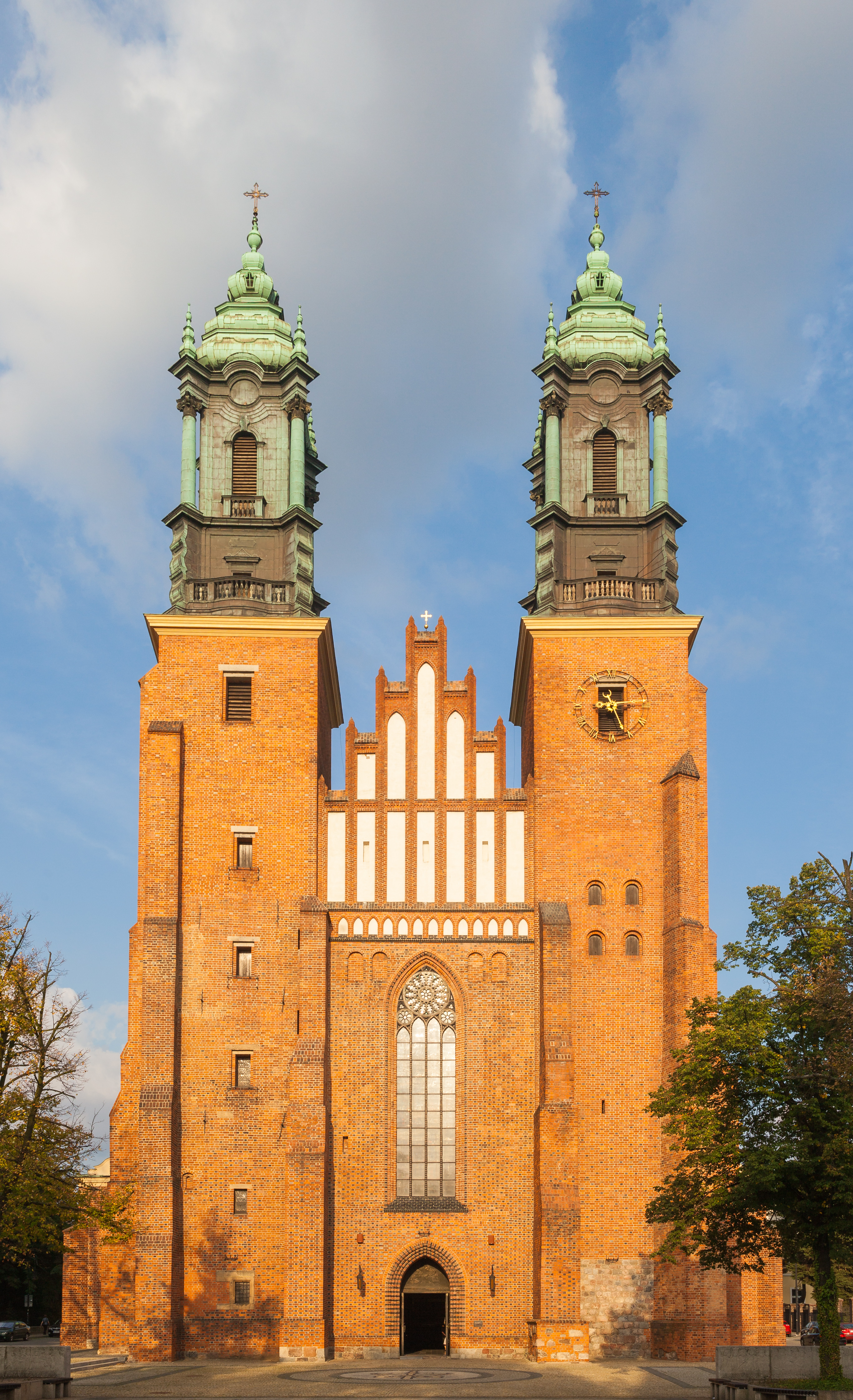
- The Archcathedral Basilica of St. Peter and St. Paul

Religion
- Affiliation: Roman Catholic
- Diocese: Archdiocese of Poznań
- Ecclesiastical or organisational status: Cathedral (968); Metropolitan archcathedral (1821); Minor basilica (1962)
- Year consecrated: 1880

Location
- Location: Poznań, Poland
- Interactive map of Sts. Apostles Peter and Paul Archcathedral Basilica
- Coordinates: 52°24′41″N 16°56′52″E

Architecture
- Style: Gothic, among others
- Completed: 10th century (first construction); 29 June 1956 (latest renovation)

Website
- www.katedra.archpoznan.pl

The Sts. Apostles Peter and Paul Archcathedral Basilica in Poznań is one of the oldest churches in Poland and the oldest Polish cathedral, dating from the 10th century. It is the oldest historical monument in Poznań. It stands on the island of Ostrów Tumski north-east of the city centre.

== History ==
The cathedral was originally built in the c. second half of the 10th century within the fortified settlement (gród) of Poznań, which stood on what is now called Ostrów Tumski. This was one of the main political centers in the early Polish state, and included a ducal palace (excavated by archaeologists since 1999, beneath the Church of the Virgin Mary which stands in front of the cathedral). The palace included a chapel, perhaps built for Dobrawa, the Christian wife of Poland's first historical ruler, Mieszko I. Mieszko himself was baptised in 966, possibly at Poznań – this is regarded as a key event in the Christianization of Poland and consolidation of the state. The cathedral was built around this time; it was raised to the status of a cathedral in 968 when the first missionary bishop, Bishop Jordan, came to Poland.

Saint Peter became the patron of the church because, as the first cathedral in the country, it had the right to have the same patron as St. Peter's Basilica in the Vatican. The pre-Romanesque church which was built at that time was about 48 meters in length. Remains of this building are still visible in the basements of today's basilica. The first church survived for about seventy years, until the period of the pagan reaction and the raid of the Bohemian duke Bretislav I (1034–1038). The cathedral was rebuilt in the Romanesque style, remains of which are visible in the southern tower.

In the 14th and 15th centuries, the church was rebuilt in the Gothic style. At that time, a crown of chapels was added. A fire in 1622 did such serious damage that the cathedral needed a complete renovation, which was carried out in the Baroque style. Another major fire broke out in 1772 and the church was rebuilt in the Neo-Classical style. In 1821, Pope Pius VII raised the cathedral to the status of a Metropolitan Archcathedral and added the second patron - Saint Paul. The last of the great fires occurred on 15 February 1945, during the Battle of Posen and its capture by the Red Army, assisted by Polish volunteers. The damage was serious enough that the conservators decided to return to the Gothic style, using as a base medieval relics revealed by the fire. The cathedral was reopened on 29 June 1956. In 1962, Pope John XXIII gave the church the title of minor basilica.

== Notable interments ==
The cathedral is the place of burial of the following rulers:

- 992 - Mieszko I
- 1025 - Boleslaus the Brave
- 1034 - Mieszko II
- 1058 - Casimir the Restorer
- 1239 - Ladislaus Odonic
- 1257 - Przemysł I
- 1279 - Boleslaus the Pious
- 1296 - Przemysł II

== Gallery ==
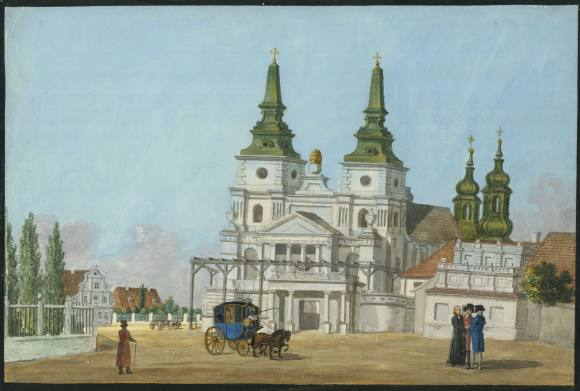
The pre-1945 façade (illustration from 1798)

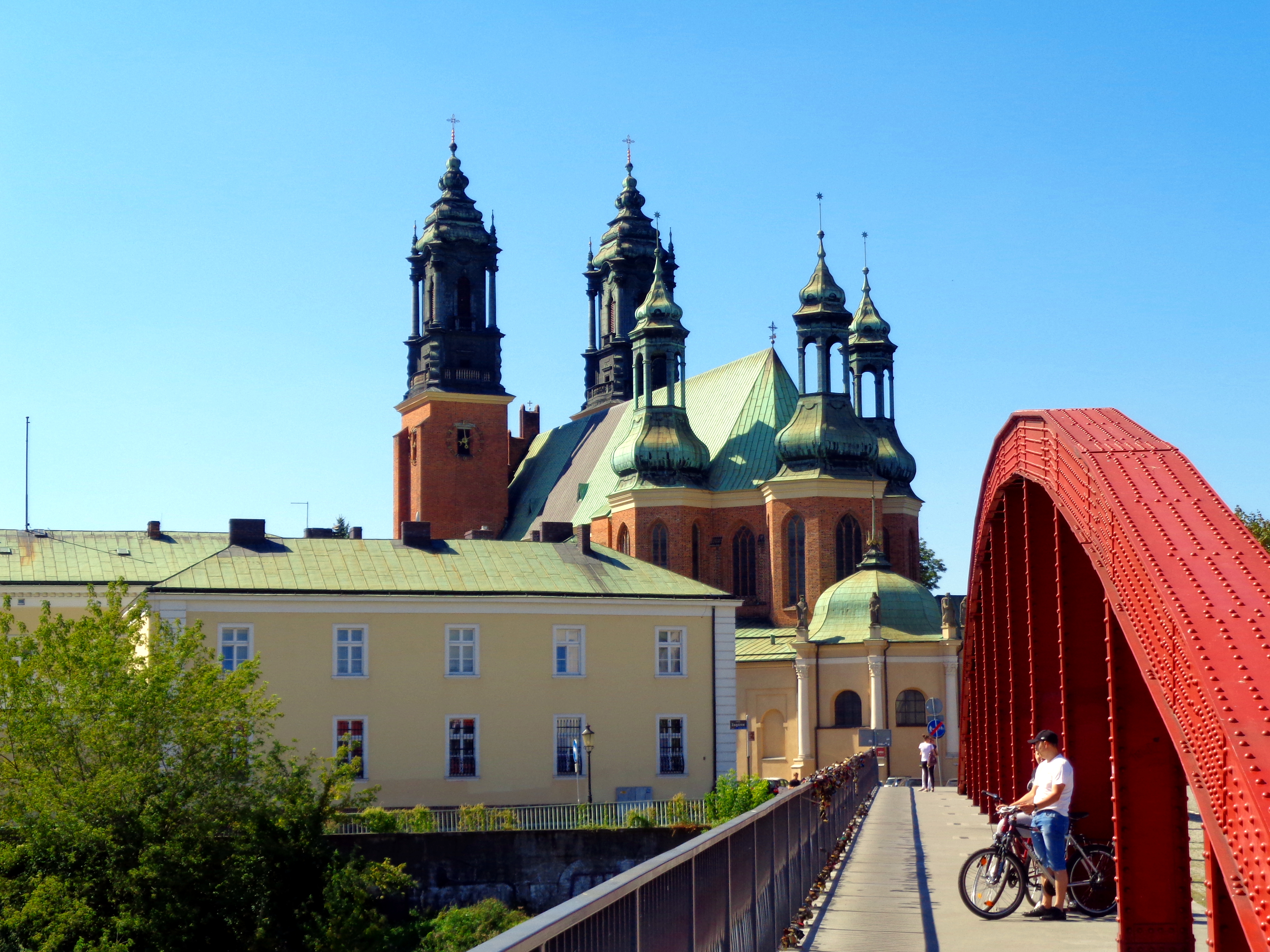
View of the eastern side

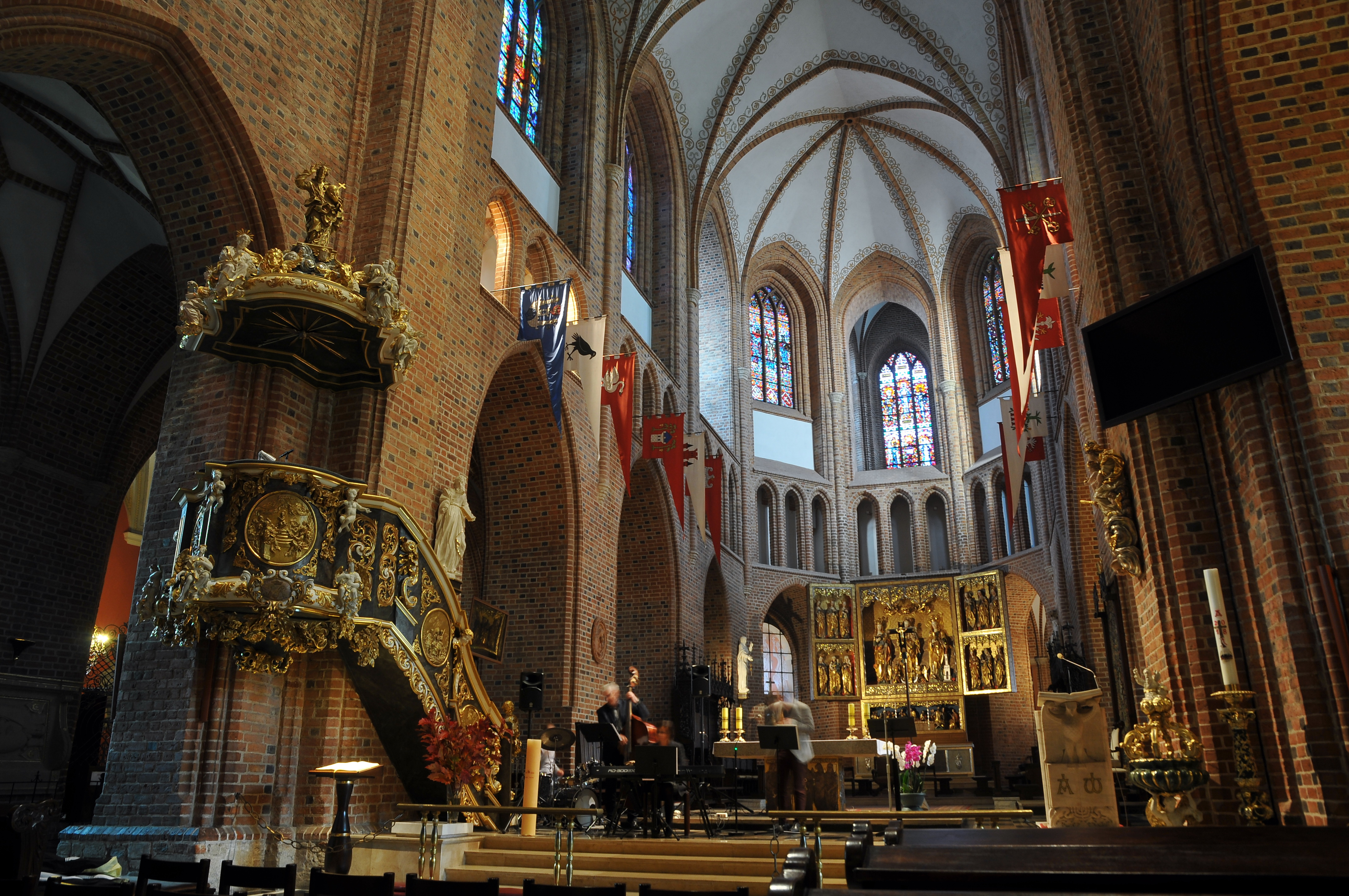
Interior

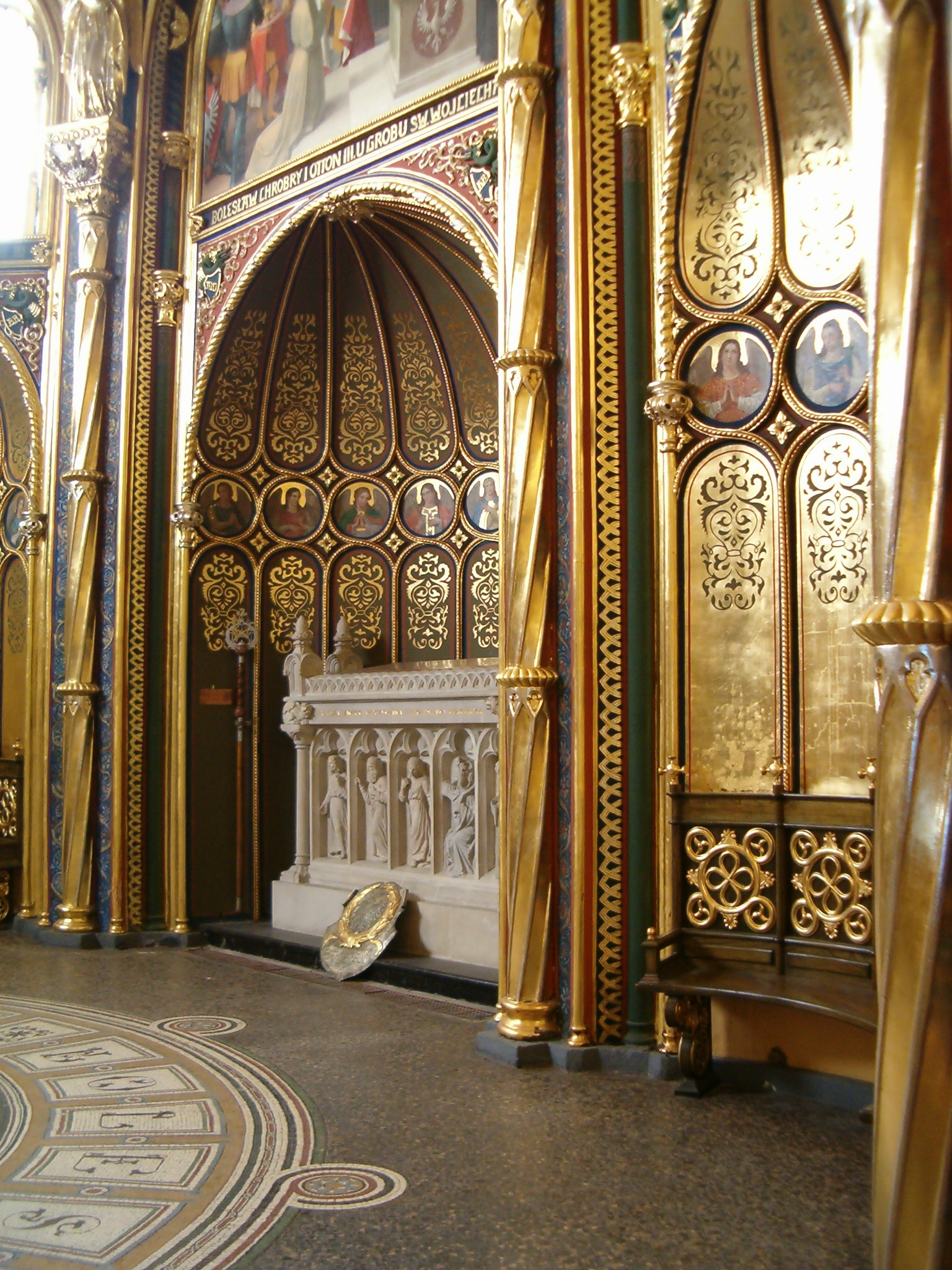
Tomb of Mieszko the First and Bolesław Chrobry

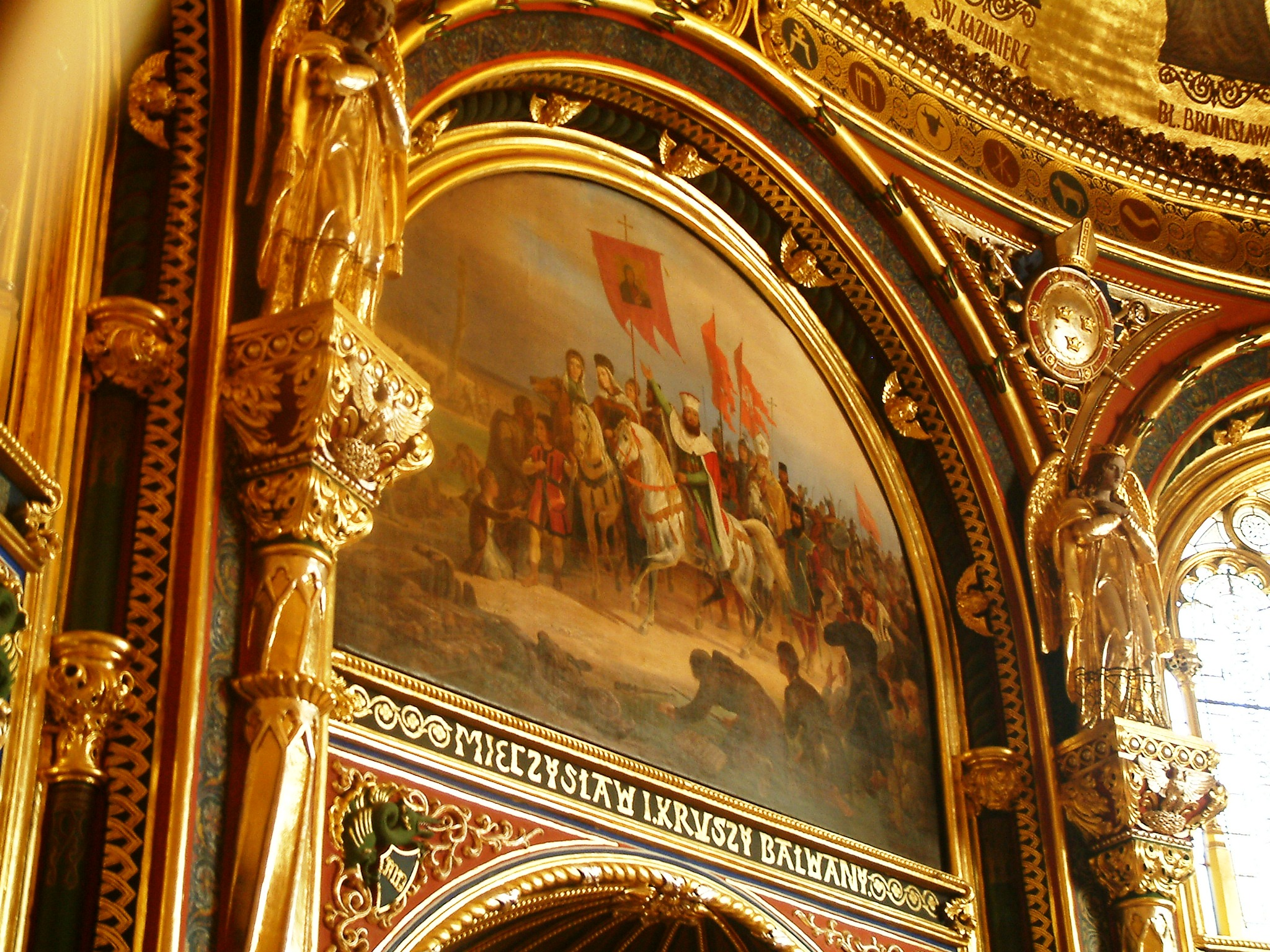
Mieczysław I by January Suchodolski

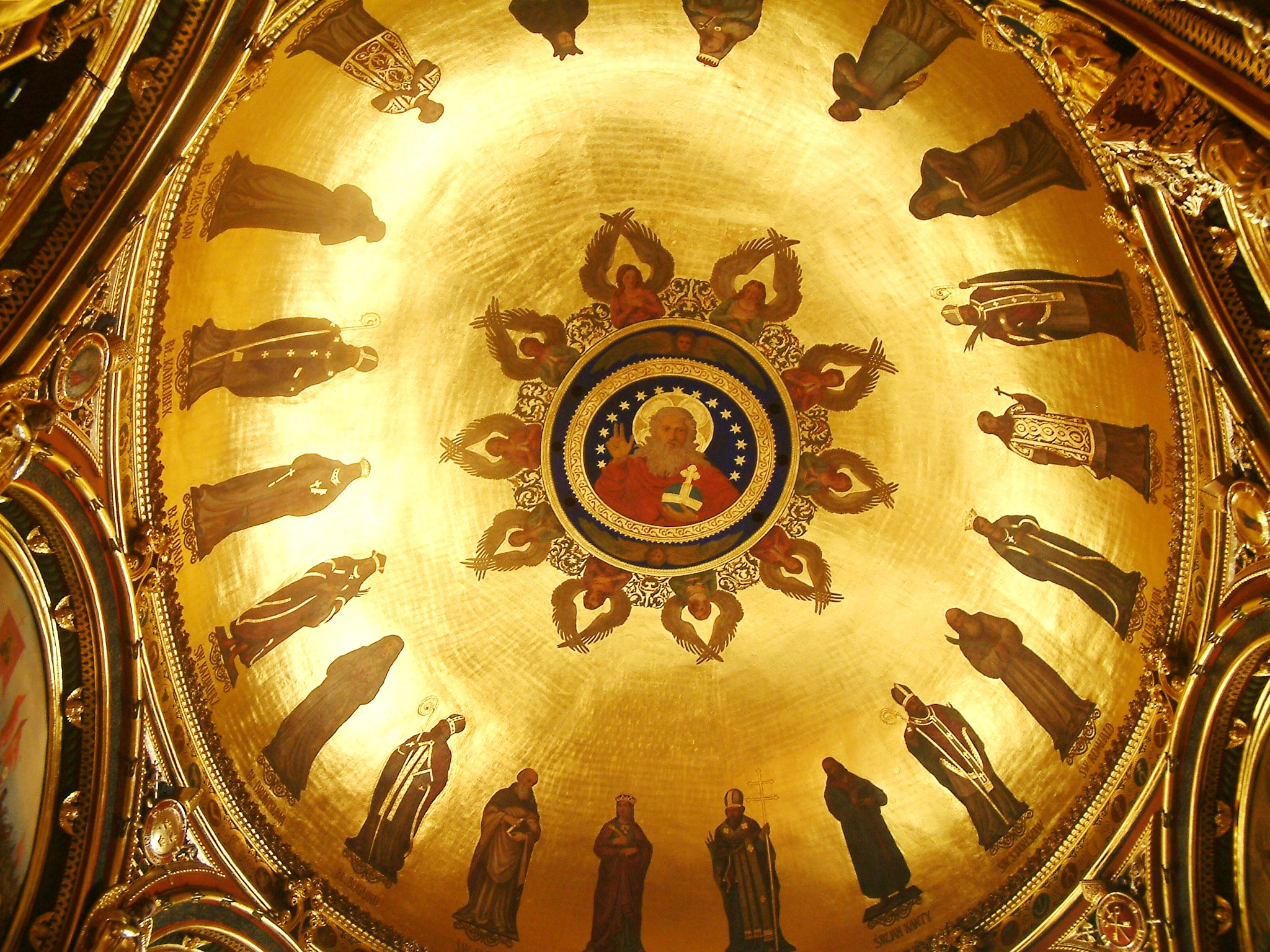
Dome of the Golden Chapel

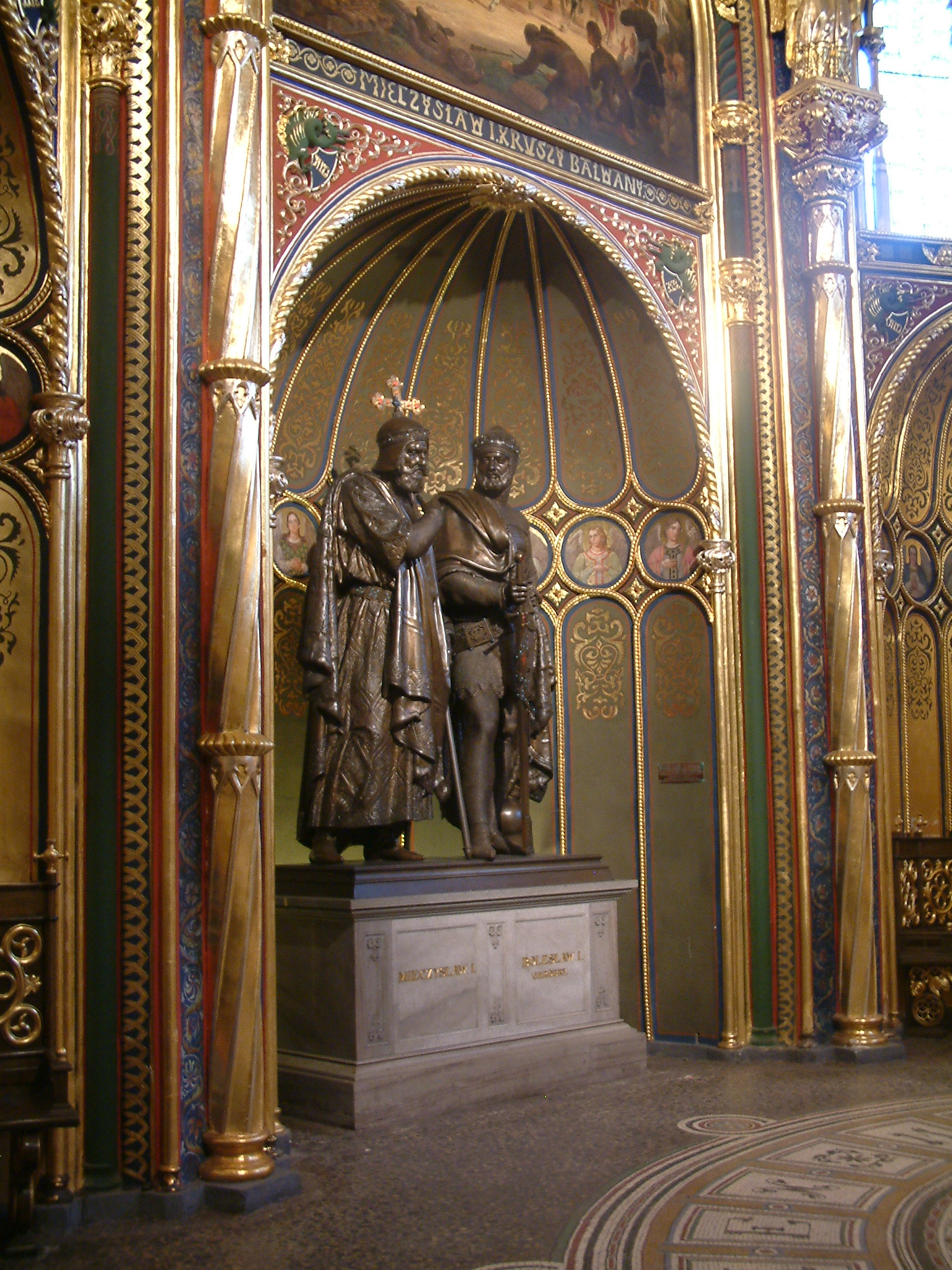
Monument of Mieszko I and Bolesław Chrobry, by Christian Daniel Rauch, founded by Edward Raczyński

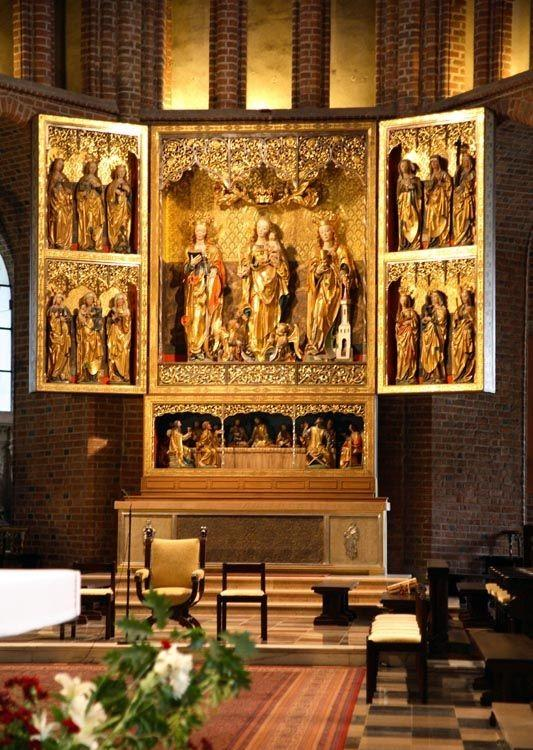
Altar

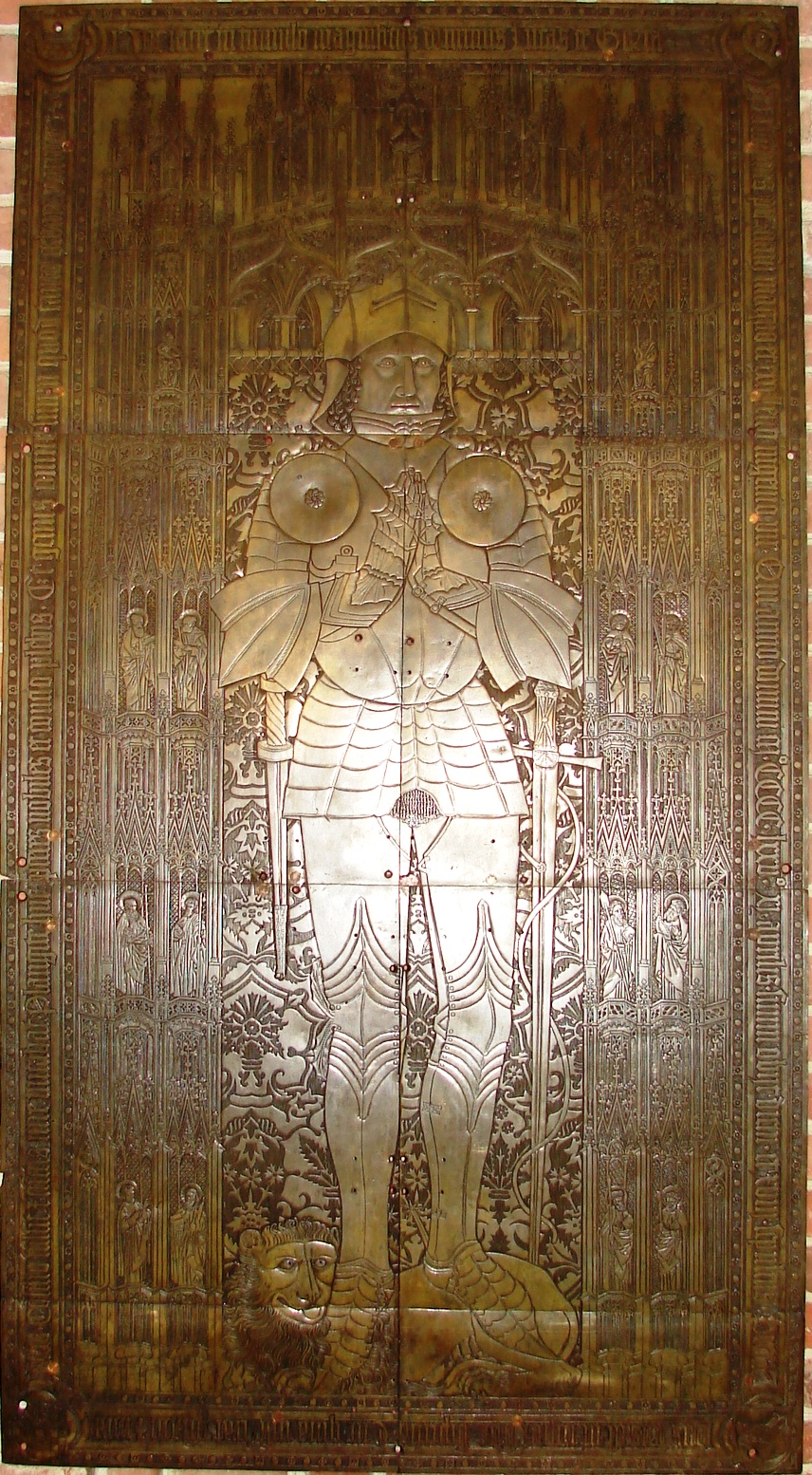
Tomb plate from Visher's workshop of voivod Łukasz I Górka

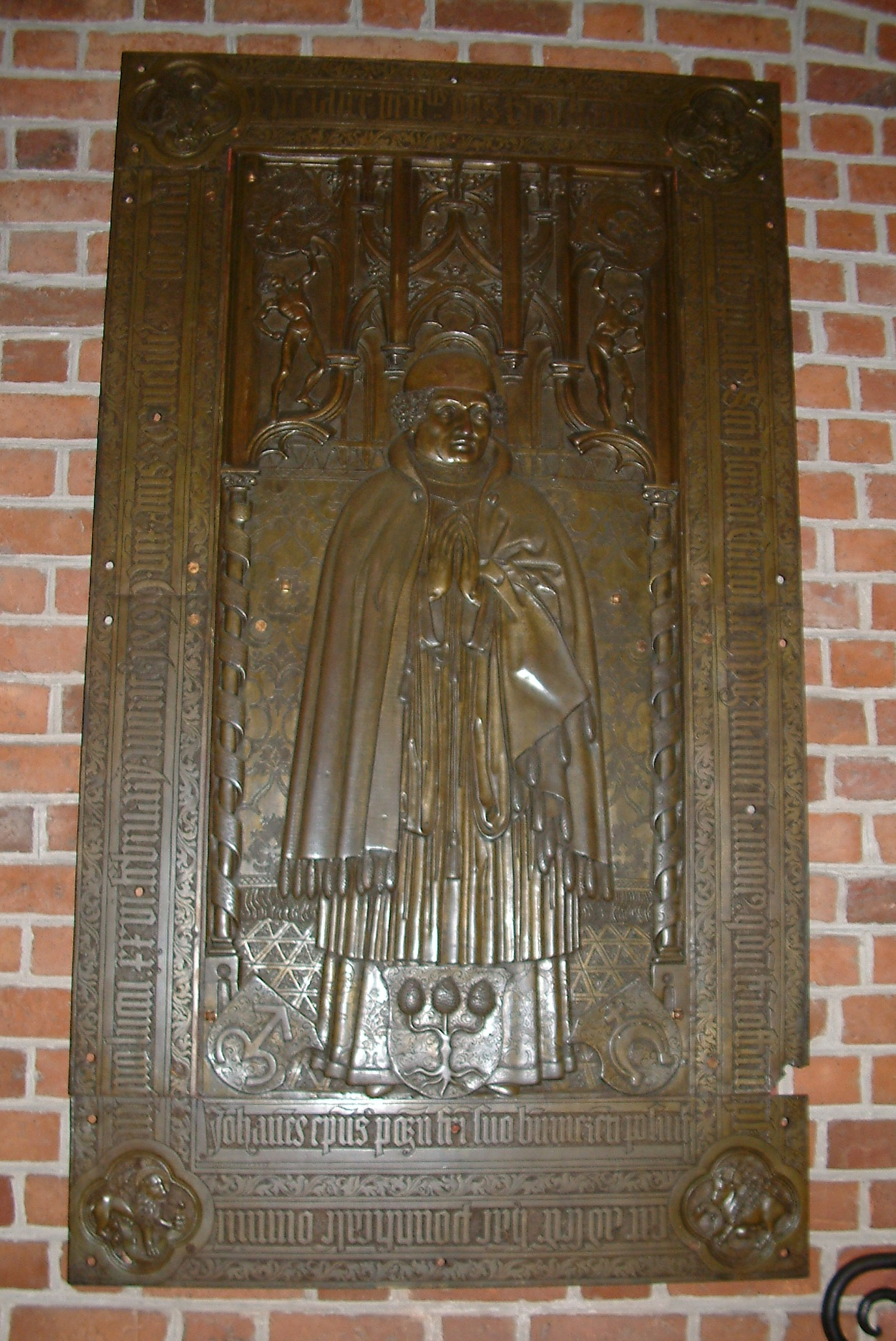
Tomb plate from Visher's workshop of canon Bernard Lubrański

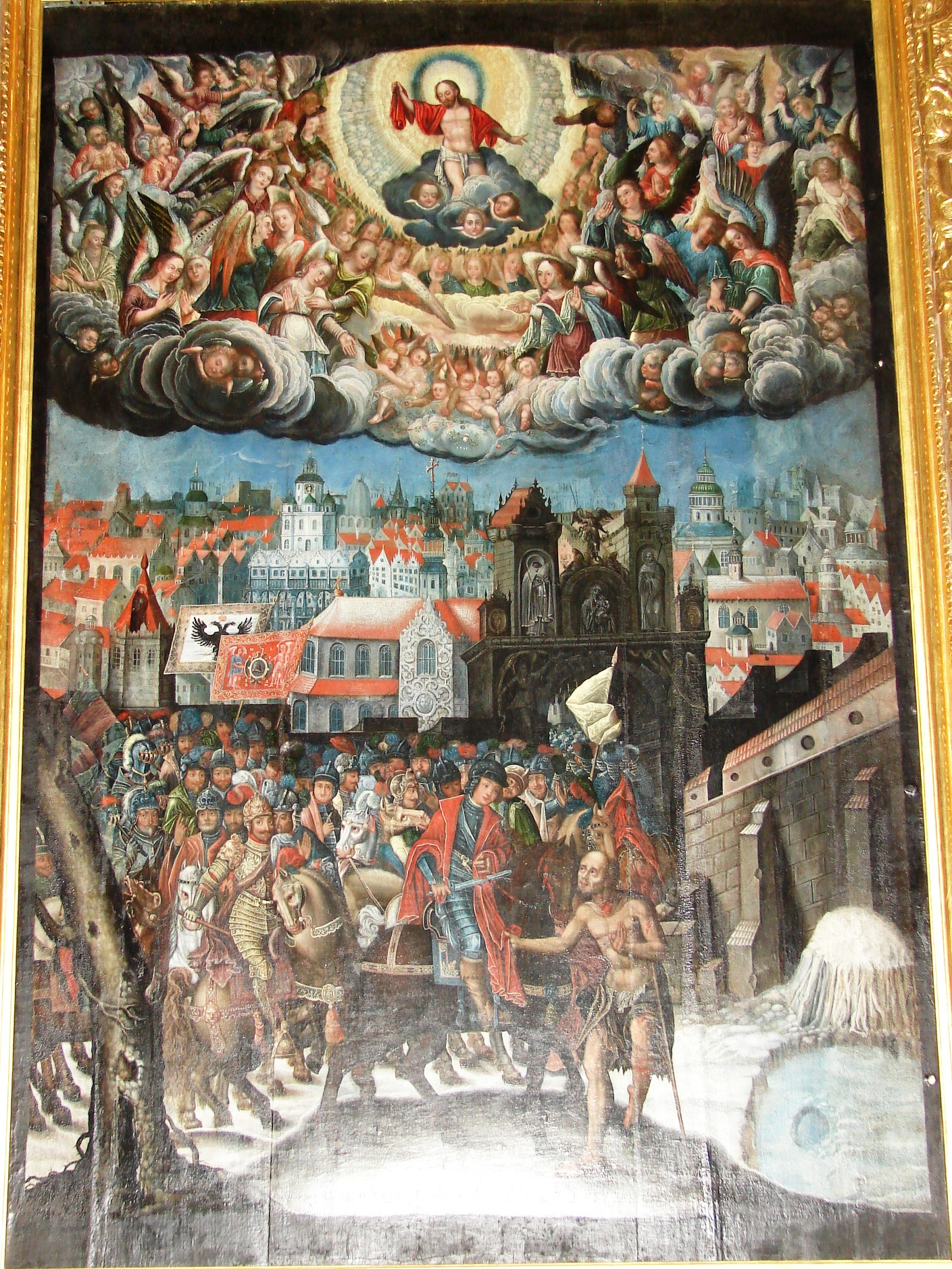
Entry of St. Martin to Amiens

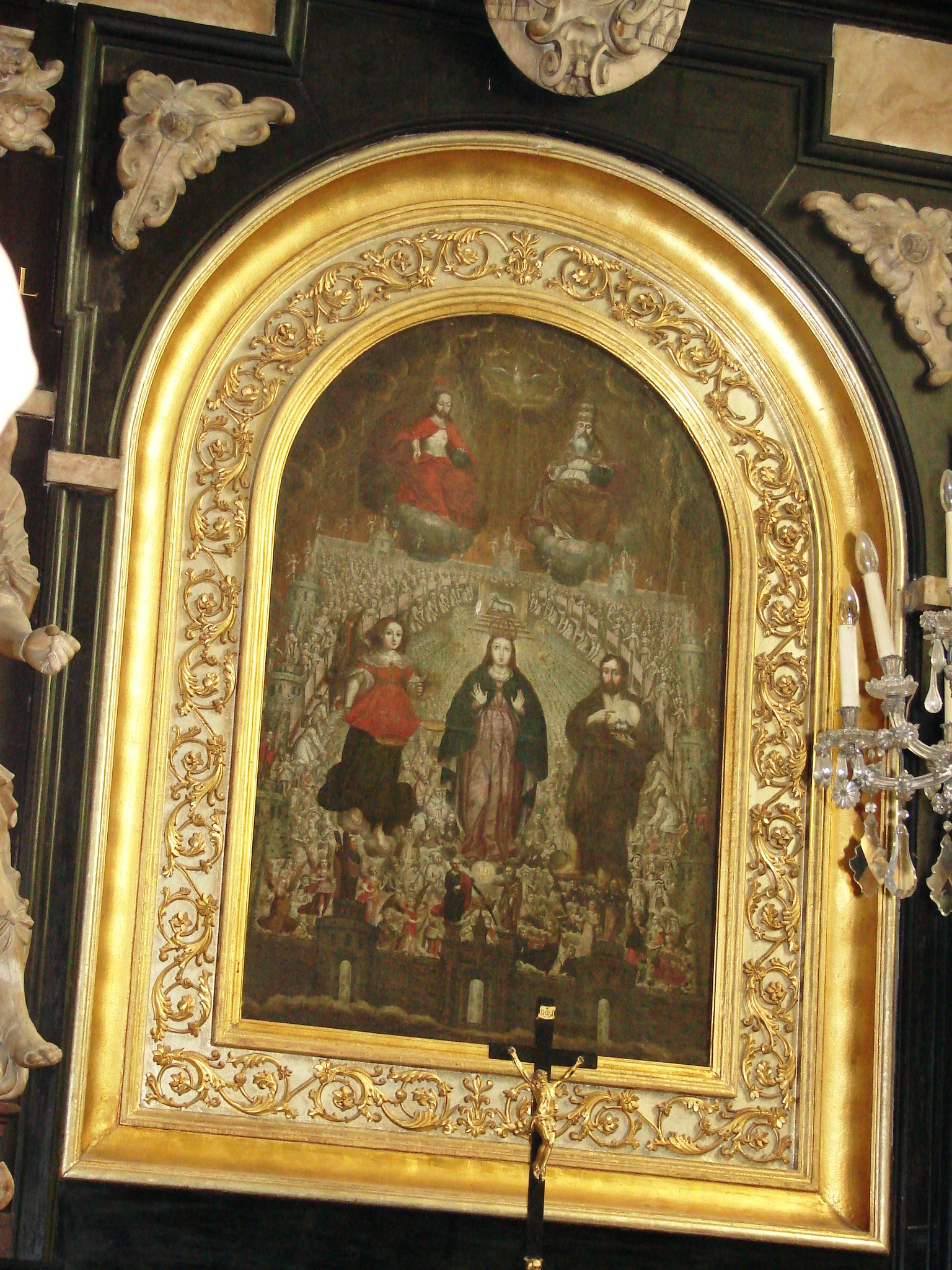
Heavenly Jerusalem

Plan of the cathedral

== See also ==
- Bishops of Poznań
- Royal coronations in Poland
- Sword of Saint Peter
- Poznań Nightingales
