= Małachowski (Nałęcz) =

Polish noble family

Nałęcz coat of arms of the Małachowski family

Małachowski (plural: Małachowscy, feminine form: Małachowska) was a Polish nobility family from Małachowice in central Poland, firstly mentioned in the 15th century.

== History ==
The progenitor of the family was Bartłomiej Małachowski (died 1433). The family owned a number of estates, among others: Nałęczów, Jurków, Brzeszcze, Dobra, Zadziele, Gruszowiec, Chyszowki, Łostówka, Wilczyce, Końskie, Lubomierz, Baranów Sandomierski, Radoszyce, Majkowice, Ćmielów, Borki, Borkowice, Grabowiec, Bodzechów, Nowe Miasto nad Pilicą, Opoczno, Ostróg, Piotrków Trybunalski, Włoszczowa, Białaczów, Ostrołęka, Grocholice, Bolencin, Niedźwiedź, and Rzeczniów.

== Notable members ==
- Jan Małachowski, Bishop of Krakow
- Jan Małachowski (Grand Chancellor of the Crown)
- Jacek Małachowski
- Stanisław Małachowski
- Godzimir Małachowski
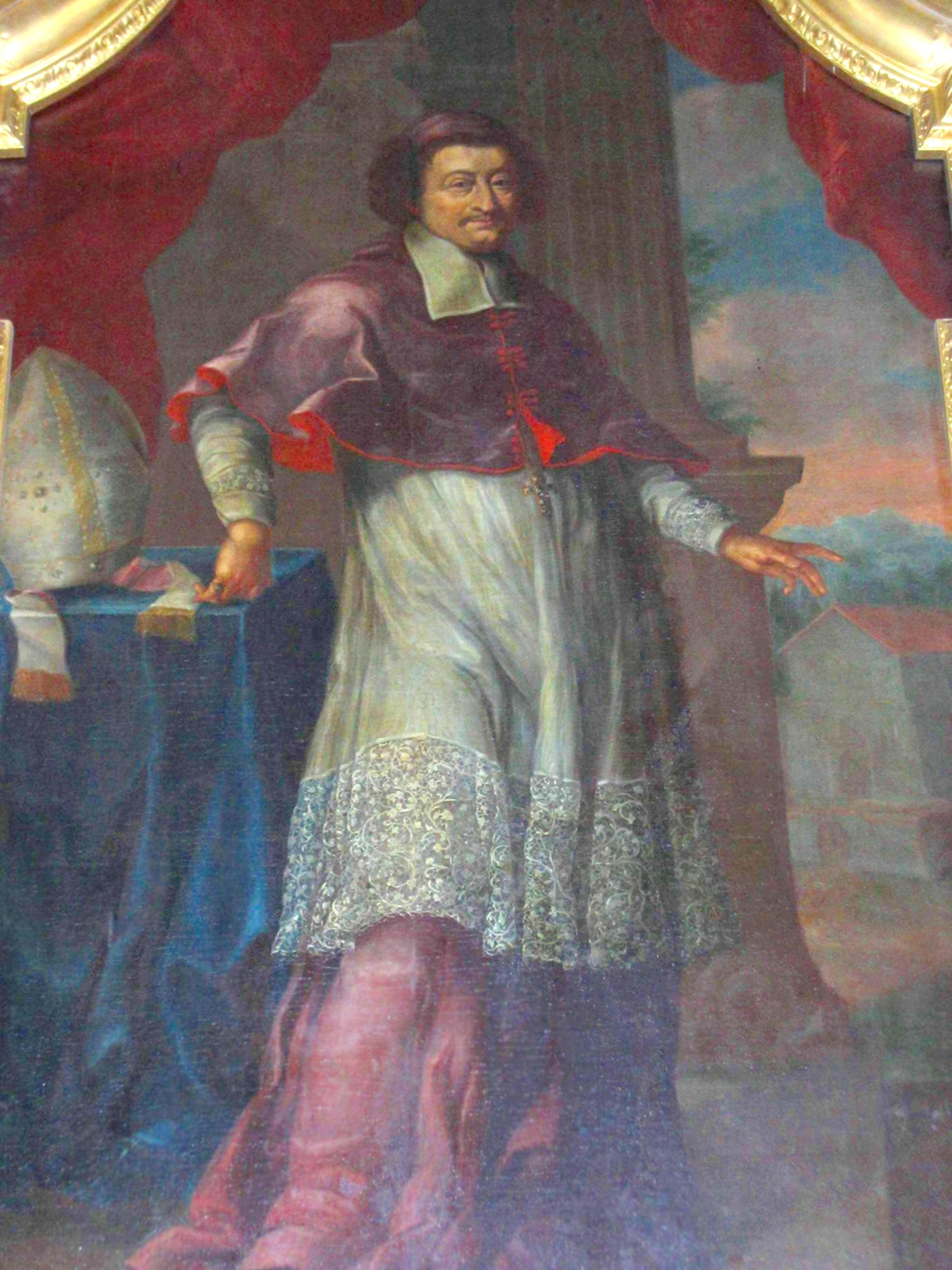
Bishop Jan Małachowski (17th century)

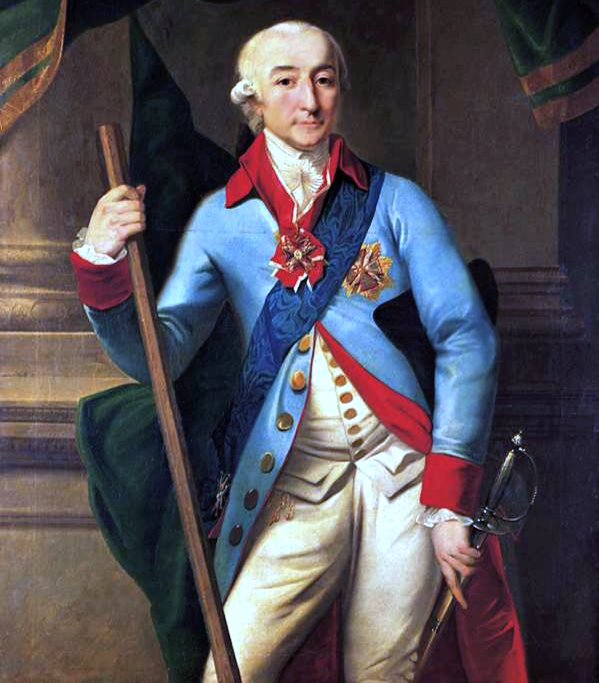
Stanisław Małachowski; portrait by Józef Peszka

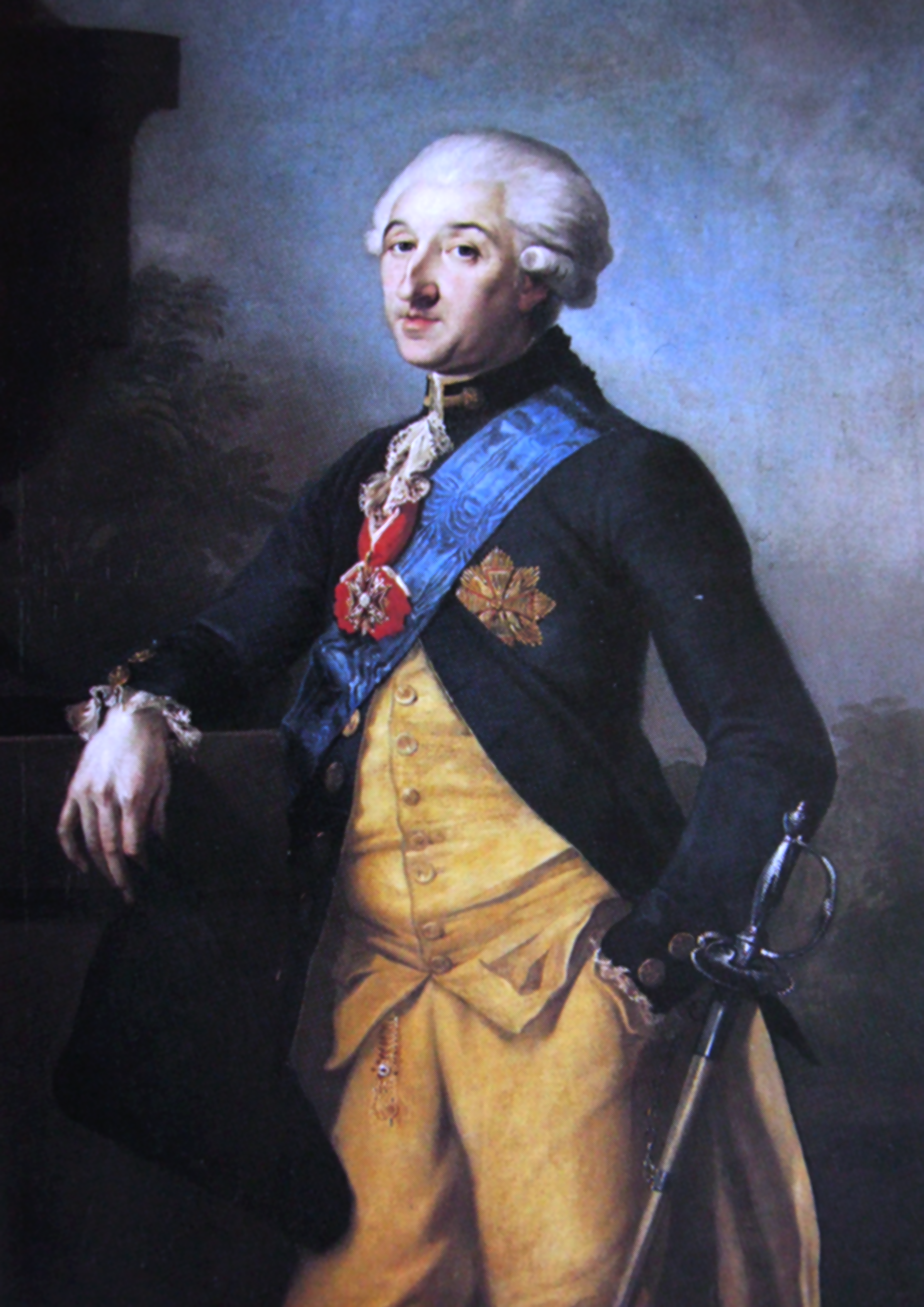
Jan Nepomucen Małachowski; portrait by Józef Peszka; grandson of Jan Małachowski, the Grand Chancellor

== Coat of arms ==
The family coat of arms was Nałęcz.

Counts Małachowski

Counts Małachowski

== Residences ==
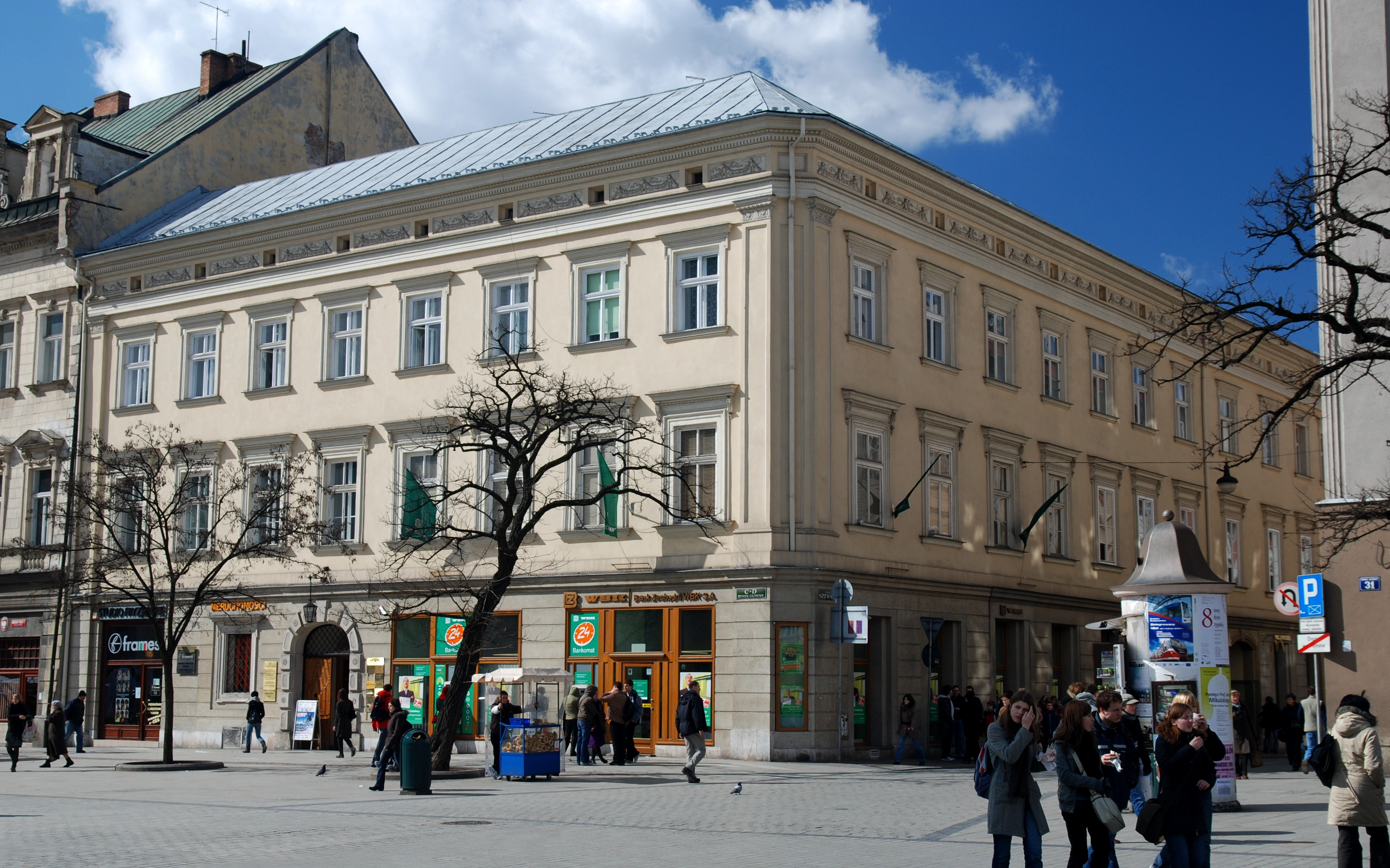
Małachowski Palace in Kraków

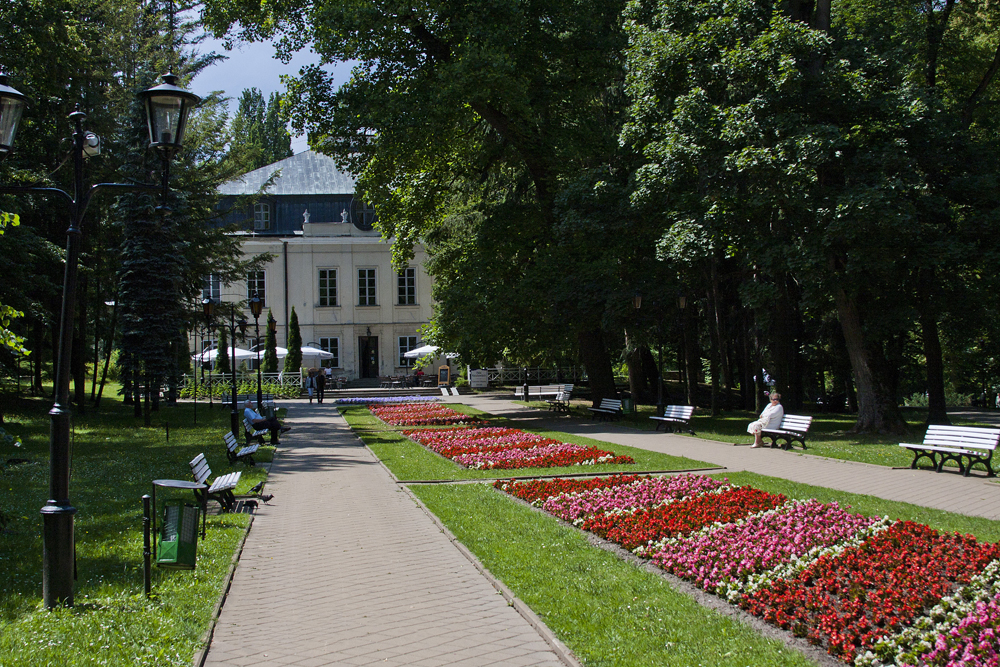
Małachowski Palace in Nałęczów

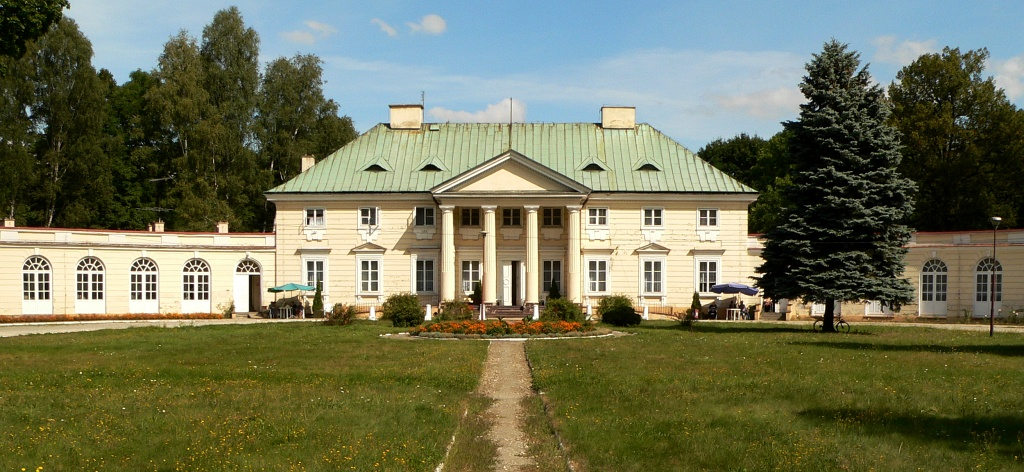
Małachowski Palace in Białaczów
