= Małachowski =

Coat of arms of Małachowski noble family

Małachowski (feminine Małachowska) is a Polish surname, it may refer to:

- Adrian Małachowski (born 1998), Polish footballer
- Godzimir Małachowski (1852–1908), Polish lawyer
- Chris Malachowsky (born 1959), American electrical engineer and billionaire businessman
- David Malachowski (1955–2022), American guitarist, producer and composer
- Dominik Małachowski, 16th-century Roman Catholic archbishop from Poland
- Jacek Małachowski (1737–1821), Polish nobleman and politician
- Jan Małachowski (1623–1699), Polish Bishop of Chełmno, Bishop of Kraków, and Vice-Chancellor to the Crown of the Kingdom of Poland
- Jan Małachowski (1698–1762), count of Końskie and Białaczów, Grand Chancellor of the Crown of the Kingdom of Poland
- Kazimierz Małachowski (1765–1845), Polish general
- Ludwig Malachowski Thorell (born 2005), Swedish footballer
- Maksim Malakhovskiy (born 1984), Russian footballer and coach
- Nicole Malachowski (born 1974), American aviator (surname acquired by marriage)
- Piotr Małachowski (born 1983), Polish athlete
- Ricardo de Jaxa Malachowski, Peruvian architect
- Ryszard Malachowskis (born 1965), decathlete who represented the Soviet Union and later Lithuania
- Stanisław Małachowski (1736–1809), Polish nobleman and politician
- Wilhelm von Malachowski (1914–1980), German military officer
- The House of Małachowski (Nałęcz), a noted Polish family
