= Gmina Mszana Dolna =

Gmina Mszana Dolna Mszana Dolna Commune
- Gmina
- Flag Coat of arms
- Interactive map of Gmina Mszana Dolna
- Coordinates (Mszana Dolna): 49°40′N 20°4′E
- Country: Poland
- Voivodeship: Lesser Poland
- County: Limanowa
- Seat: Mszana Dolna

Area
  - Total: 169.83 km^{2} (65.57 sq mi)

Population (2006)
  - Total: 16,451
  - Density: 96.867/km^{2} (250.89/sq mi)
- Website: http://www.mszana.pl/

Gmina Mszana Dolna is a rural gmina (administrative district) in Limanowa County, Lesser Poland Voivodeship, in southern Poland. Its seat is the town of Mszana Dolna, although the town is not part of the territory of the gmina.

The gmina covers an area of 169.83 square kilometres (65.6 sq mi), and as of 2006 its total population is 16,451.

== Villages ==
Gmina Mszana Dolna contains the villages and settlements of Glisne, Kasina Wielka, Kasinka Mała, Łętowe, Łostówka, Lubomierz, Mszana Górna, Olszówka and Raba Niżna.

== Neighbouring gminas ==
Gmina Mszana Dolna is bordered by the town of Mszana Dolna and by the gminas of Dobra, Kamienica, Lubień, Niedźwiedź, Pcim, Rabka-Zdrój and Wiśniowa.
