= Stanisław Świerk =

Polish footballer and coach

Personal information
- Date of birth: 19 June 1935
- Place of birth: Jurków, Poland
- Date of death: 16 January 2004 (aged 68)
- Place of death: Wrocław, Poland
- Position: Forward

Youth career
- AKS Długopole
- Olimpia Poznań

Senior career*
| Years | Team | Apps | (Gls) |
| 1954–1955 | Ślęza Wrocław | | |
| 1956 | Czarni Szczecin | | |
| 1957 | Lotnik Warsaw | | |
| 1958 | Ślęza Wrocław | | |
| 1959–1961 | Stal Rzeszów | | |
| 1962–1963 | Unia Oświęcim | | |
| 1963–1968 | Motor Lublin | | |

Managerial career
- 1968–1970: Motor Lublin
- 1970–1974: Moto-Jelcz Oława
- 1974–1975: Odra Wrocław
- 1975–1978: Górnik Wałbrzych
- 1978: GKS Tychy
- 1979: Widzew Łódź
- 1979–1982: Zagłębie Lubin
- 1983–1984: Odra Opole
- 1984–1985: Ślęza Wrocław
- 1986–1987: Górnik Wałbrzych
- 1987–1988: Ślęza Wrocław
- 1988–1990: Zaglebie Lubin
- 1991–1993: Ślęza Wrocław
- 1993–1995: Śląsk Wrocław
- 1995: Ślęza Wrocław
- Lechia Dzierżoniów
- * Club domestic league appearances and goals

Stanisław Świerk (19 June 1935 – 16 January 2004) was a Polish football manager and player.

== Playing career ==
Świerk was born in Jurków. He played for Czarni Szczecin, Lotnik Warsaw, Stal Rzeszow, Unia Oświęcim and Motor Lublin.

== Coaching career ==
Świerk managed Motor Lublin, Moto Jelcz Oława, Odra Wrocław, Górnik Wałbrzych, GKS Tychy, Widzew Łódź, Zaglebie Lubin, Odra Opole, Ślęza Wrocław and Śląsk Wrocław.

== Honours ==
=== Manager ===
Moto Jelcz Oława

- Regional league Wrocław: 1973–74

Górnik Wałbrzych

- Regional league Wrocław II: 1975–76

Zagłębie Lubin

- II liga, group I: 1988–89

Śląsk Wrocław

- II liga, group I: 1994–95
