= Mszana Dolna =

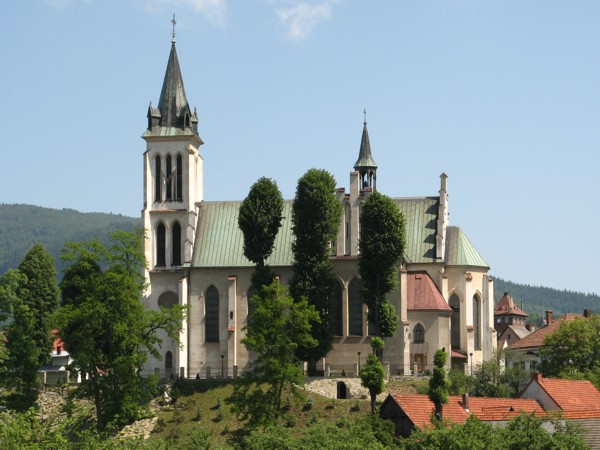
- Saint Archangel Michael Church

- Coat of arms

- Location within Poland
- Coordinates: 49°40′N 20°4′E
- Country: Poland
- Voivodeship: Lesser Poland
- County: Limanowa
- Gmina: Mszana Dolna (urban gmina)

Government
  - Mayor: Agnieszka Orzeł

Area
  - Total: 27.1 km^{2} (10.5 sq mi)
- Highest elevation: 968 m (3,176 ft)
- Lowest elevation: 400 m (1,300 ft)

Population (2017)
  - Total: 7,982
  - Density: 294.5/km^{2} (763/sq mi)
- Time zone: UTC+1 (CET)
  - Summer (DST): UTC+2 (CEST)
- Postal code: 34–730
- Area code: +48 18
- Car plates: KLI
- Website: http://www.mszana-dolna.pl

Mszana Dolna [ˈmʂana ˈdɔlna] is a town in Limanowa County, Lesser Poland Voivodeship, Poland, with 7,431 inhabitants (2004). Mszana Dolna lies among the hills of western Beskids, 50 kilometres (31 miles) south of Kraków. The town is located in a deep valley, surrounded by several ranges, including the Gorce Mountains featuring Gorce National Park. Mszana is located along National Road Nr. 28, which goes west–east, from Zator to Przemyśl. In 2002, the area of Mszana Dolna was 27.1 square kilometres (10.5 sq mi), out of which forests covered 50%, and arable land 36%.

== History ==
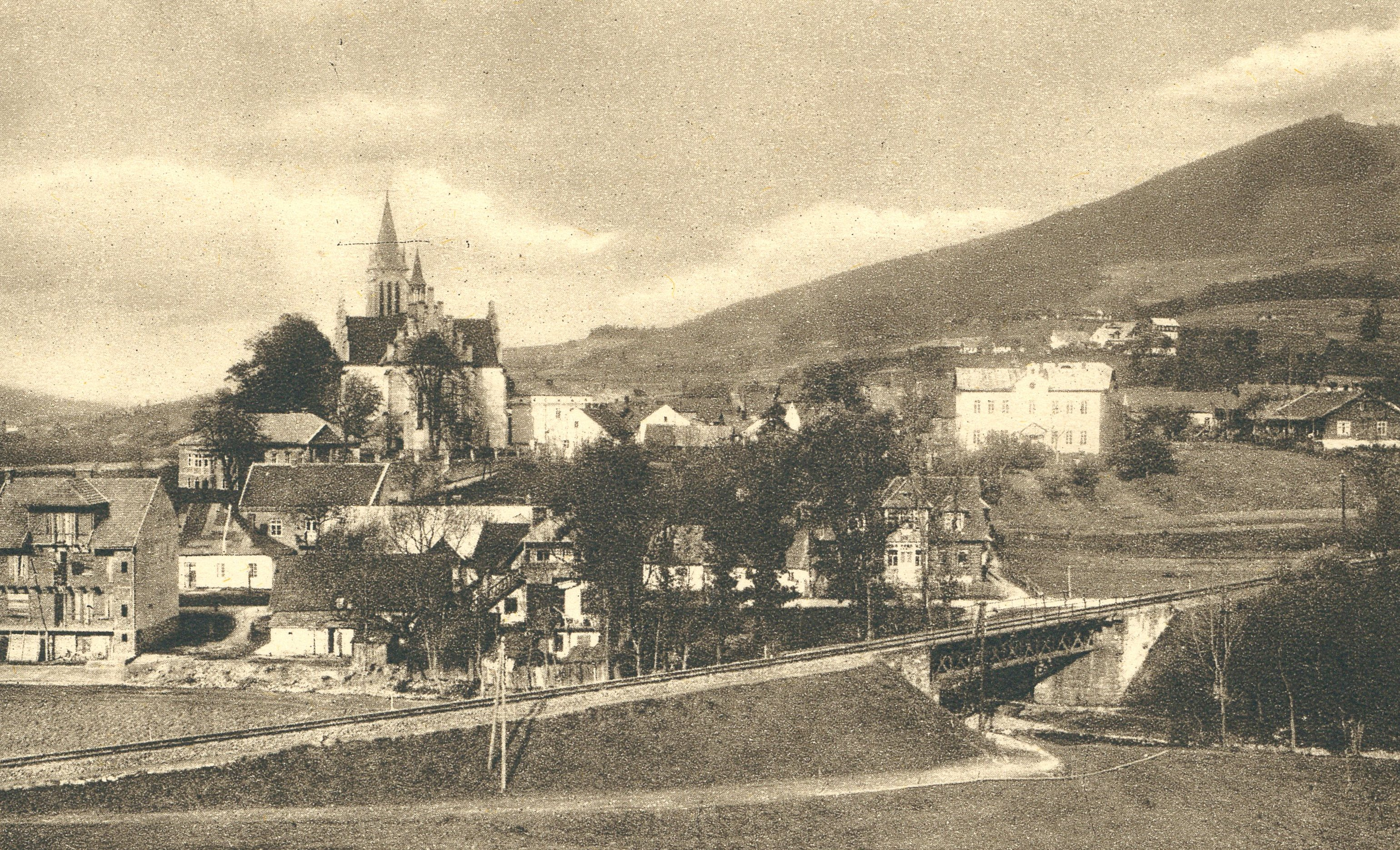
Mszana Dolna in the early 20th century

Mszana Dolna was first mentioned in 1365. It received its Magdeburg rights some time in the late 14th or early 15th century, and since its inhabitants were mostly German Walddeutsche, the town was called Kinsbark (or Königsberg). Kinsbark lost its town privileges some time in the mid-15th century, and the former town, which had changed its name into Mieścisko, was in 1464 merged with the village of Mszany. The village was completely burned in the Swedish invasion of Poland (1655–1660). Mszana administratively belonged to the Kraków Voivodeship in the Lesser Poland Province until the First Partition of Poland in 1772, when it was annexed by the Habsburg Empire, and made part of its newly formed province of Galicia. In 1918, Mszana returned to Poland, as the country regained independence.

In early September 1939, during the German-Soviet invasion of Poland at the start of World War II, the 10th Armoured Cavalry Brigade of General Stanisław Maczek fought here against the advancing Wehrmacht. During the war, Mszana lost one-third of its population, including its Jewish residents, of whom 881 were murdered by the Germans on 19 August 1942. After the unsuccessful Polish Warsaw Uprising, in October 1944, the Germans deported 4,700 Poles (mainly old people, ill people and women with children) from the Dulag 121 camp in Pruszków, where they were initially imprisoned, to Mszana Dolna.

In 1952 Mszana Dolna regained its town rights. Currently, it is an important tourist center, with hotels, restaurants and several tourist trails marked with different colors, leading into the mountains.

== Nearby municipalities ==
- Dobra, Lubomierz, Limanowa County
- Rabka

== Notable people ==
- Franciszek Barda (1880–1964), Polish bishop, Bishop of Przemyśl

== See also ==
- Raba River
