= Raba Niżna =

Raba
- Village
- Raba Niżna
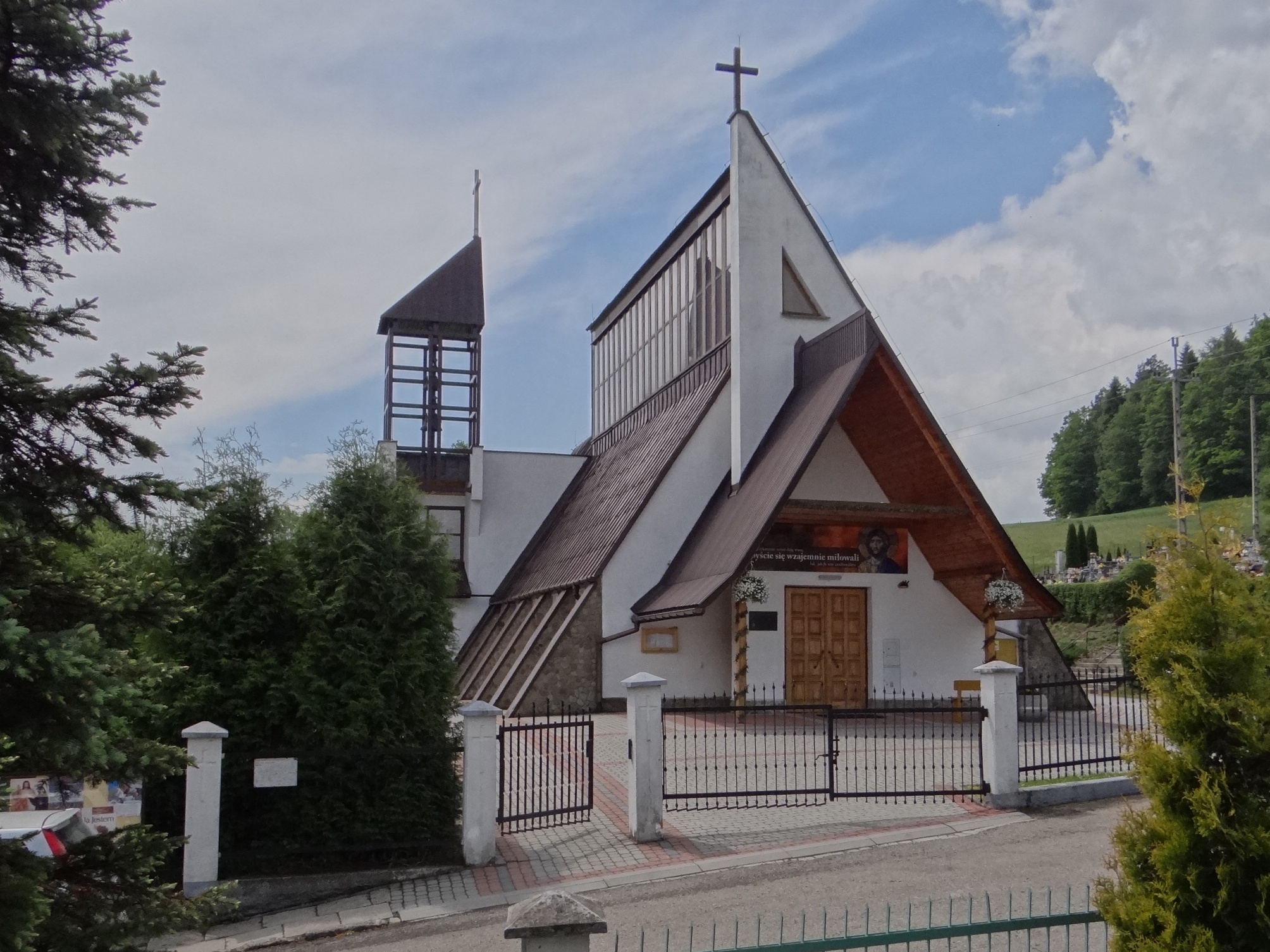
- Church of Saint Joseph

- Location within Poland
- Coordinates: 49°39′N 20°2′E
- Country: Poland
- Voivodeship: Lesser Poland
- County: Limanowa
- Gmina: Mszana Dolna

Raba Niżna [ˈraba ˈniʐna] is a village in the administrative district of Gmina Mszana Dolna, within Limanowa County, Lesser Poland Voivodeship, in southern Poland.
