= Wilczyce, Lesser Poland Voivodeship =

Wilczyce
- Village
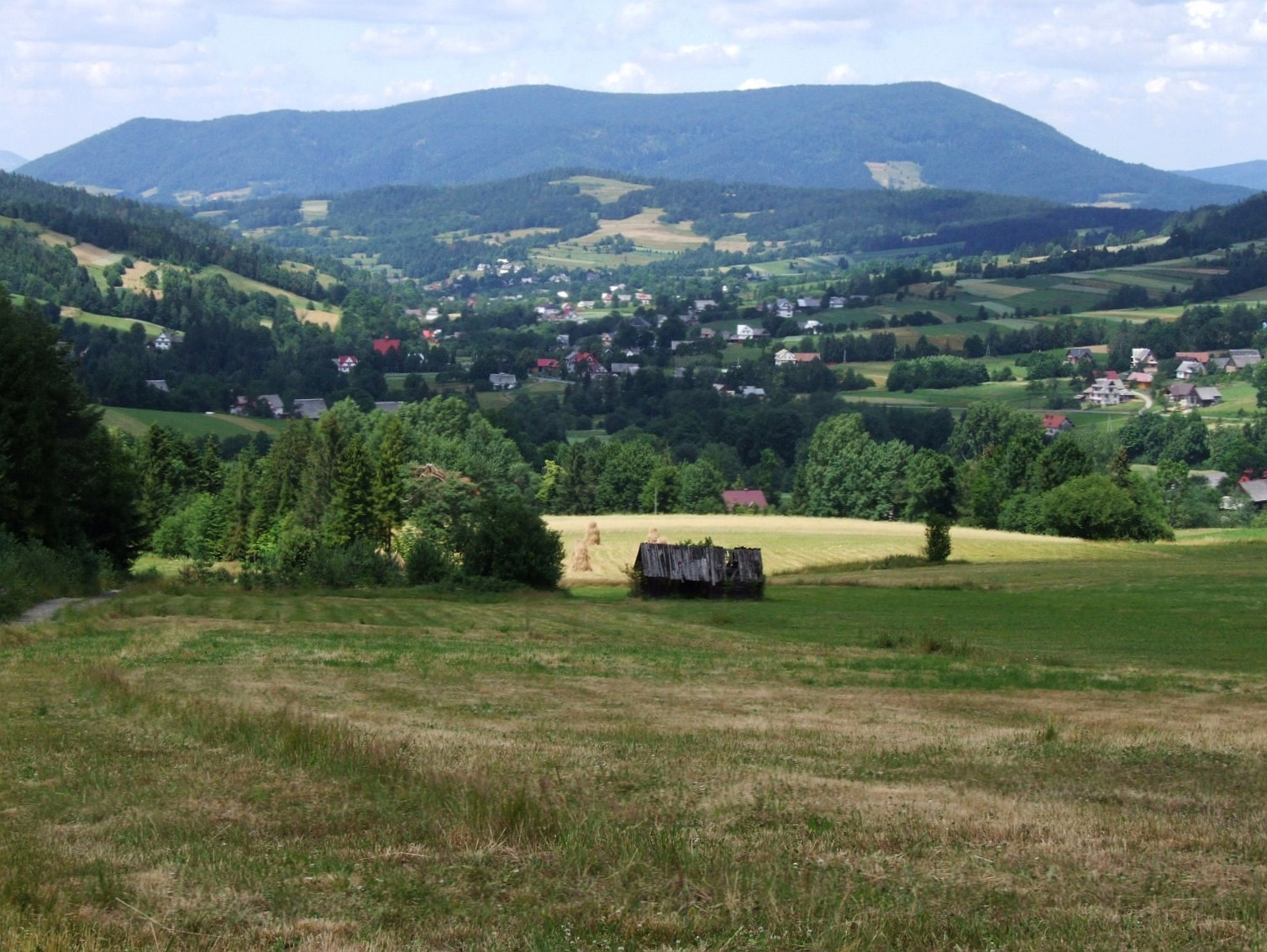

- Location within Poland
- Coordinates: 49°41′N 20°11′E
- Country: Poland
- Voivodeship: Lesser Poland
- County: Limanowa
- Gmina: Dobra
- Population: 722

Wilczyce [vilˈt͡ʂɨt͡sɛ] is a village in the administrative district of Gmina Dobra, within Limanowa County, Lesser Poland Voivodeship, in southern Poland.
