= Goswin (bishop of Poznań) =

Polish bishop

Goswin, Bishop of Poznan was a 12th-century Polish bishop, whose death was reported in the obituary of the Abbey of St. Vincent under the daily date 5 April. His diocese is not known, but it is presumed he was a Bishop of Poznań.

In the catalogue of Bishops of Poznań there is a large gap from 1112AD, when the bishop was Pavel, until 1146AD, when Bogufał was bishop. Goswin could therefore have been bishop between Paul and Bogufał.

Religious titles
Preceded by Paweł	Bishop of Poznań ?	Succeeded by Bogufał I
