= Kasinka Mała =

- Village
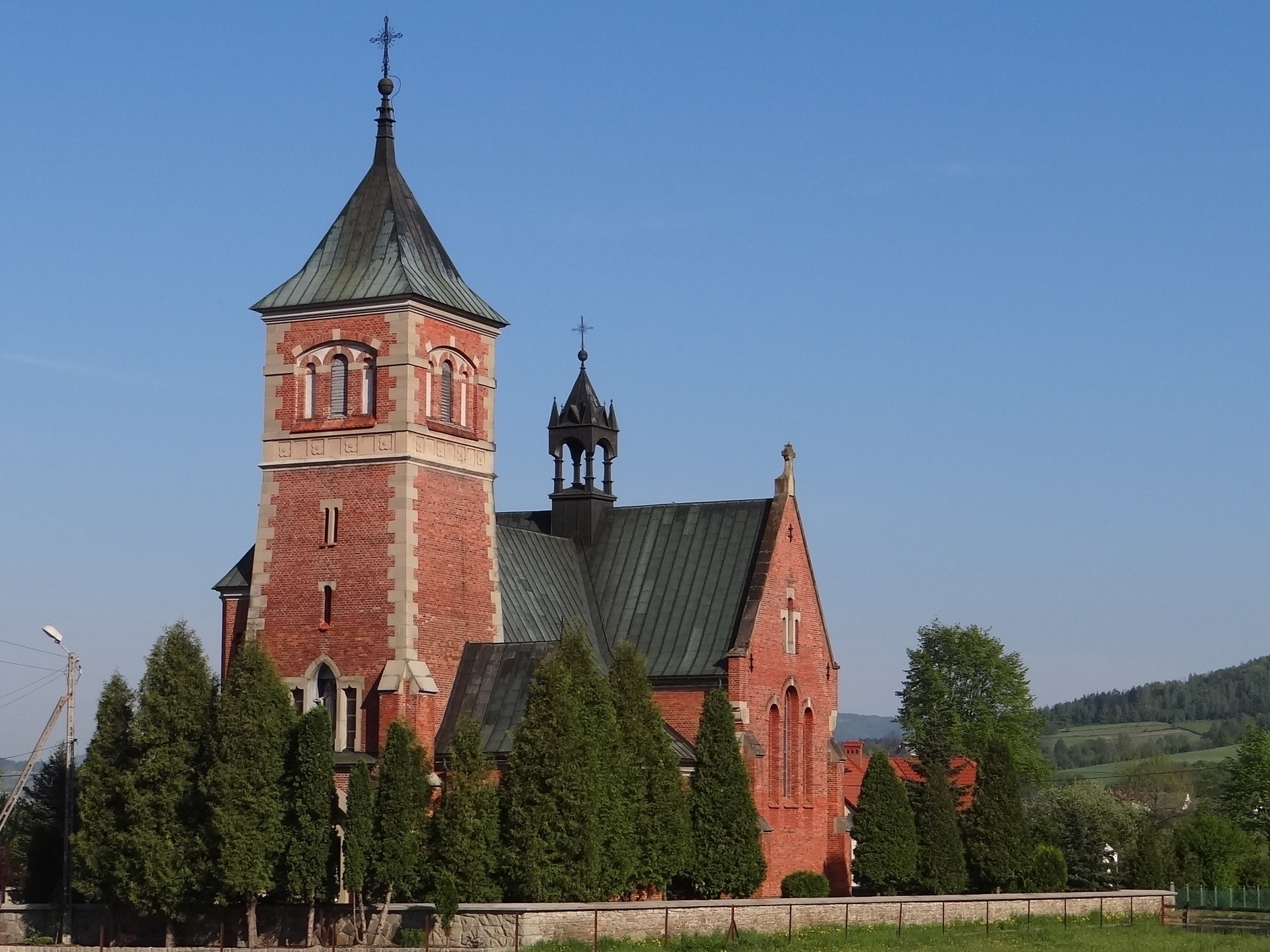
- Church of the Visitation of the Virgin Mary

- Location within Poland
- Coordinates: 49°43′N 20°2′E
- Country: Poland
- Voivodeship: Lesser Poland
- County: Limanowa
- Gmina: Mszana Dolna
- Elevation: 400 m (1,300 ft)

Population
  - Total: 3,500

Kasinka Mała [kaˈɕinka ˈmawa] is a village in the administrative district of Gmina Mszana Dolna, within Limanowa County, Lesser Poland Voivodeship, in southern Poland.
