= Skrzydlna =

- Village
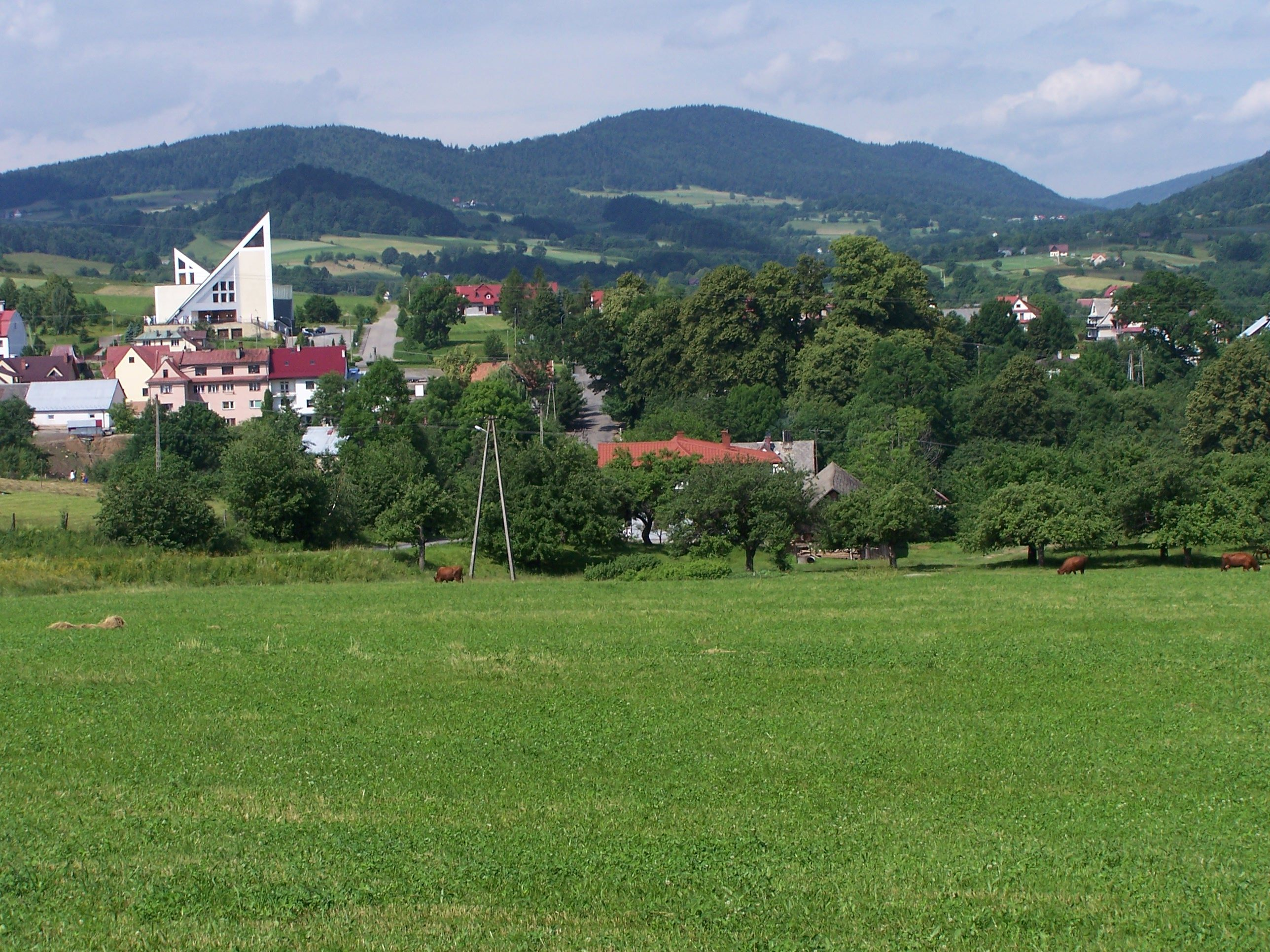
- View from Jasień to Mogielica (Beskid Wyspowy)

- Location within Poland
- Coordinates: 49°45′16″N 20°10′43″E
- Country: Poland
- Voivodeship: Lesser Poland
- County: Limanowa
- Gmina: Dobra

Skrzydlna is a village the administrative district of Gmina Dobra, within Limanowa County, Lesser Poland Voivodeship, in southern Poland.

The village, dating back to 13th century or earlier, has a 16th-century baroque church and an 18th-century noble mansion.
