= Glisne =

- Village
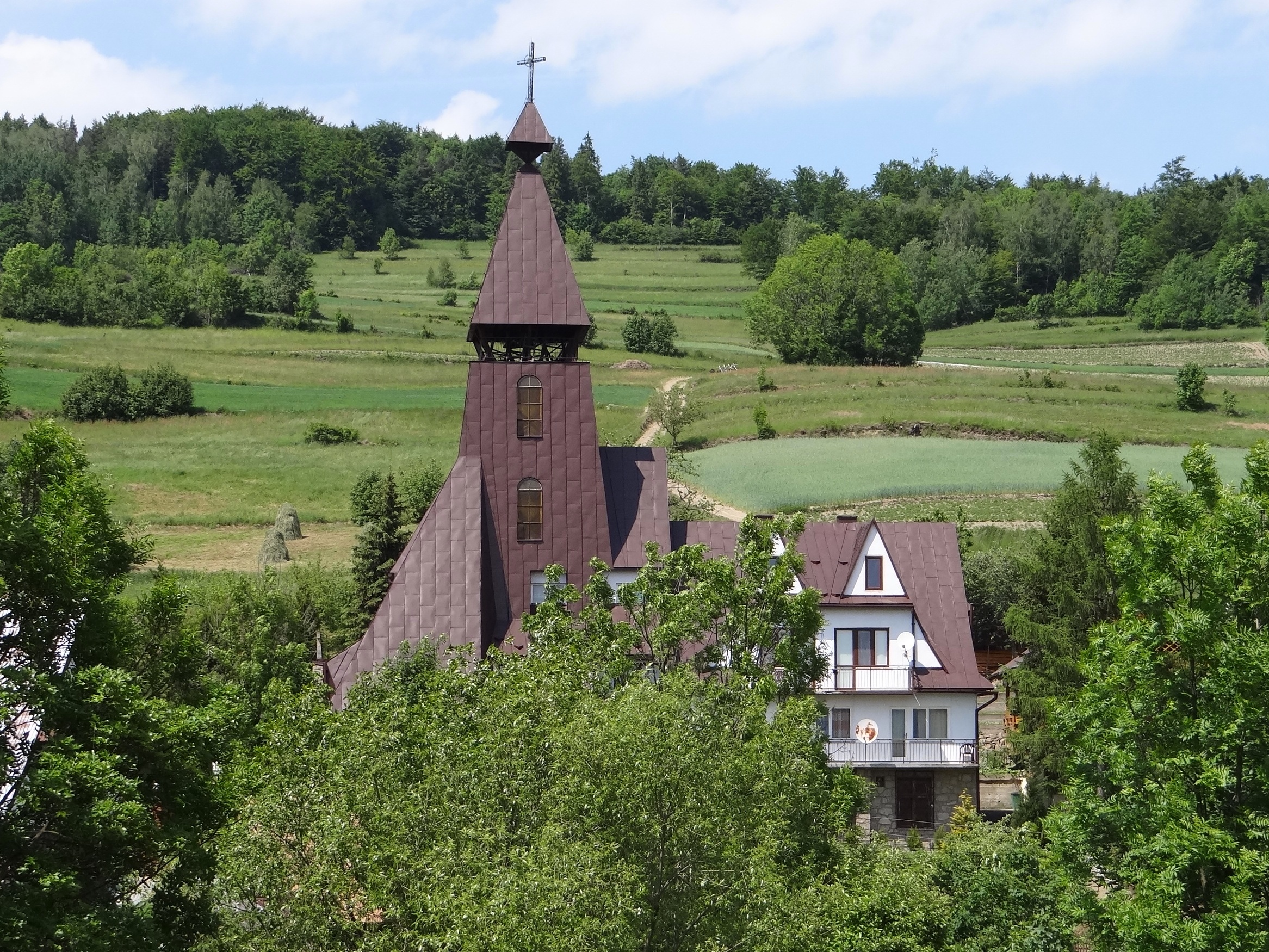
- Church of the Sacred Heart of Jesus

- Location within Poland
- Coordinates: 49°40′N 20°2′E
- Country: Poland
- Voivodeship: Lesser Poland
- County: Limanowa
- Gmina: Mszana Dolna
- Elevation: 650 m (2,130 ft)

Population
  - Total: 330
- Website: http://www.glisne.pl/

Glisne [ˈɡlisnɛ] is a village in the administrative district of Gmina Mszana Dolna, within Limanowa County, Lesser Poland Voivodeship, in southern Poland.
