= Mszana Górna =

- Village
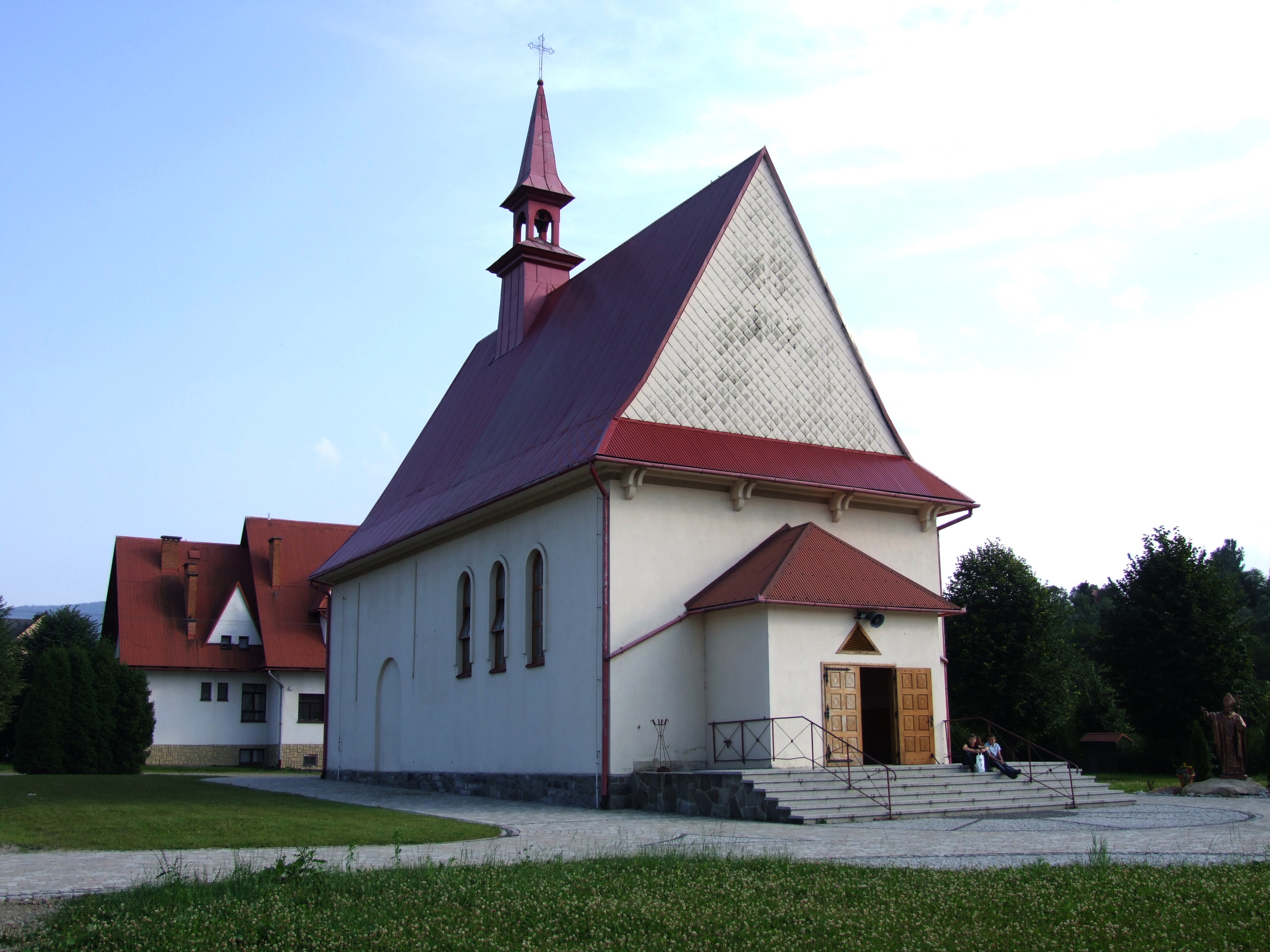
- Church of Our Lady of Perpetual Help

- Location within Poland
- Coordinates: 49°39′32″N 20°6′15″E
- Country: Poland
- Voivodeship: Lesser Poland
- County: Limanowa
- Gmina: Mszana Dolna

Population
  - Total: 2,589

Mszana Górna [ˈmʂana ˈɡurna] is a village in the administrative district of Gmina Mszana Dolna, within Limanowa County, Lesser Poland Voivodeship, in southern Poland.
