= Stróża, Limanowa County =

Stróża
- Village
- Location within Poland
- Coordinates: 49°45′6″N 20°12′42″E
- Country: Poland
- Voivodeship: Lesser Poland
- County: Limanowa
- Gmina: Dobra
- Population (approx.): 500

Stróża [ˈstruʐa] is a village in the administrative district of Gmina Dobra, within Limanowa County, Lesser Poland Voivodeship, in southern Poland.

The village has an approximate population of 500.
