= Wola Skrzydlańska =

- Village
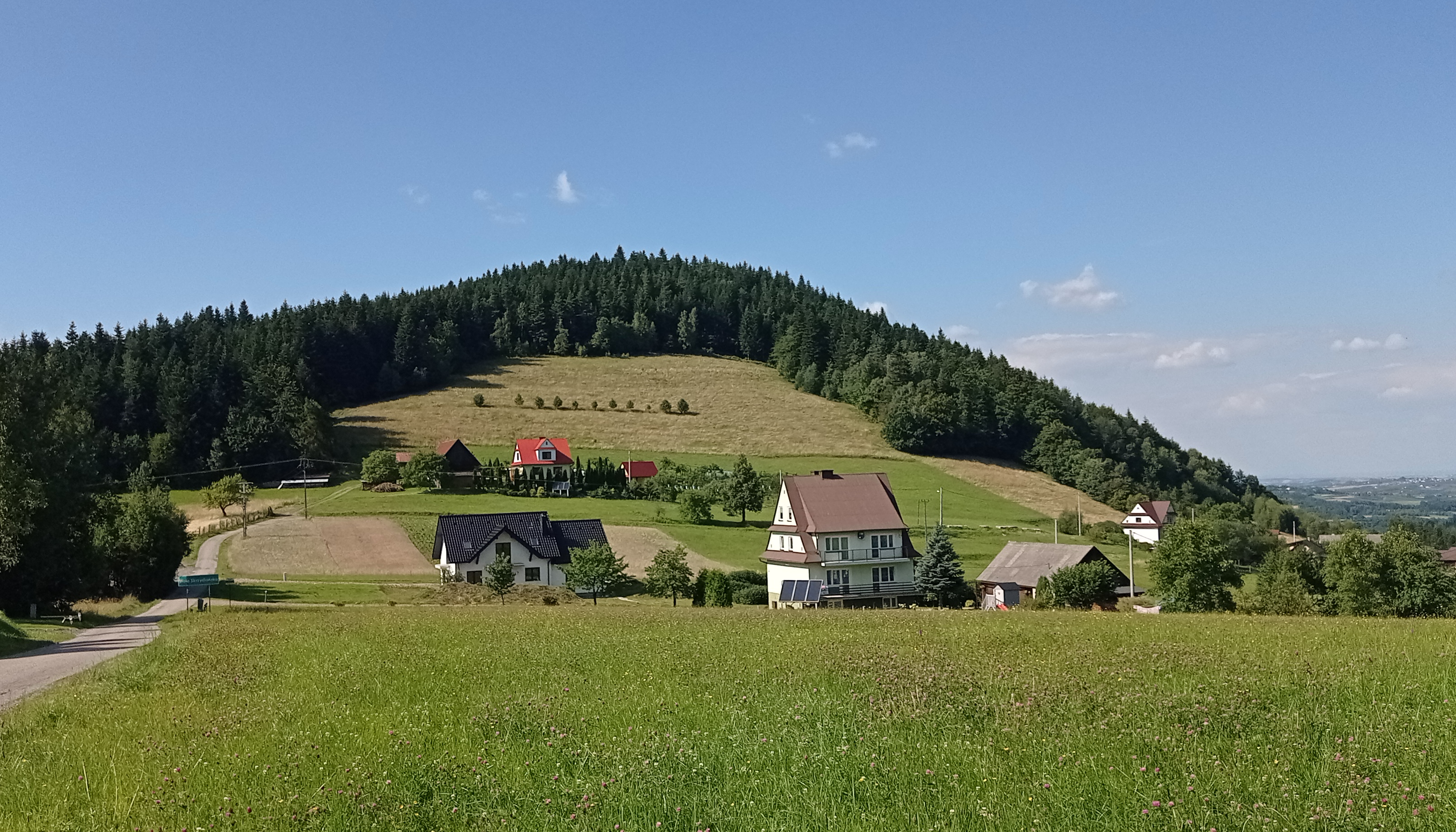

- Location within Poland
- Coordinates: 49°44′28″N 20°09′32″E
- Country: Poland
- Voivodeship: Lesser Poland
- County: Limanowa
- Gmina: Dobra
- Population: 366

Wola Skrzydlańska [ˈvɔla skʂɨdˈlaɲska] is a village in the administrative district of Gmina Dobra, within Limanowa County, Lesser Poland Voivodeship, in southern Poland.
