= Chancellor of Poland =

Historic political position in Poland

Grand Chancellor of the Crown
- State Coat of arms

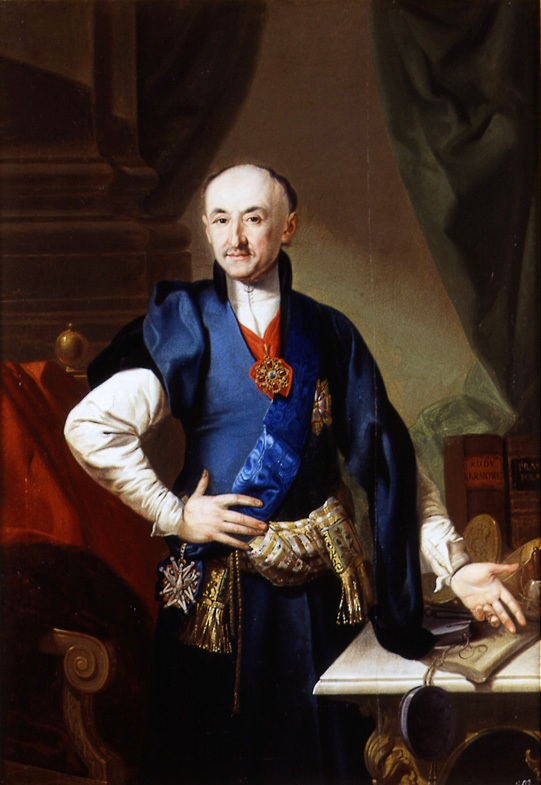
- Last to hold office Jacek Małachowski; 1786–1789
- Residence: Kraków; Warsaw
- Appointer: Monarch of Poland; Polish Parliament (Sejm)
- Formation: 12th century
- First holder: Jan? Goswin
- Final holder: Antoni Sułkowski
- Abolished: 1795

The Chancellor of Poland (Polish: Kanclerz - Polish pronunciation: [ˈkant͡slɛʂ], from Latin: cancellarius), officially, the Grand Chancellor of the Crown between 1385 and 1795, was one of the highest officials in the historic Crown of the Kingdom of Poland. This office functioned from the early Polish kingdom of the 12th century until the end of the Polish–Lithuanian Commonwealth in 1795. A respective office also existed in the Grand Duchy of Lithuania since the 16th century. Today the office of the chancellor has been replaced by that of the Prime Minister.

The Chancellors' powers rose together with the increasing importance of written documents. In the 14th century the office of Chancellor of Kraków (Polish: Kanclerz krakowski) evolved into the Chancellor of the Crown (Polish: Kanclerz koronny) and from that period the chancellor powers were greatly increased, as they became responsible for the foreign policy of the entire Kingdom (later, the Commonwealth). The Chancellor was also supposed to ensure the legality of monarch's actions, especially whether or not they could be considered illegal in the context of pacta conventa (an early set of documents containing important laws, in some aspects resembling today's constitutions). Finally, the Chancellor was also responsible for his office, the chancellery (Polish: kancelaria). A 16th-century Polish lawyer, Jakub Przybylski, described the Chancellor as the king's hand, eye and ear, translator of his thoughts and will.

From 15th century onward there were two separate Chancellor offices, neither of them subordinate to the other: Grand Chancellor (Polish: Kanclerz wielki) and Vice-Chancellor (Polish: Podkanclerzy). In the Polish-Lithuanian Commonwealth, there were four Chancellors: Grand Chancellor of the Crown (Polish: Kanclerz wielki koronny), Grand Chancellor of Lithuania (Polish: Kanclerz wielki litewski), Vice-Chancellor of the Crown (Polish: Podkanclerzy koronny), and Vice-Chancellor of Lithuania (Polish: Podkanclerzy litewski).

== History ==
During the times of fragmentation of Poland, each Polish prince had his own chancellor, but with the reunification of Poland, the office of Chancellor of Kraków (contemporary capital of the Kingdom of Poland) became dominant and other, local chancellors disappeared by the early 15th century. Also in the 15th century, the Chancellor's office was split into that of the Grand Chancellor and Vice-Chancellor. The Vice-Chancellor was, however, not a subordinate of the Chancellor and his independence was specifically confirmed by the laws passed during the reign of king Alexander Jagiellon. The Sejm of 1504 confirmed the Chancellor's office as well as its powers and responsibilities for the first time, specifically stating that one person cannot hold both Chancellors' offices, and established the Grand Lithuanian Chancellor's office. The Lithuanian Vice-Chancellor was created later, in the mid-16th century

After the Union of Lublin in 1569 there were four Chancellors (one Grand Chancellor and one Vice-Chancellor for Crown, and another pair for Lithuania).

At first, the Chancellor's office was always given to an ecclesiastic person. From 1507, Sigismund I the Old decided that the title of Grand Chancellor of the Crown would be rotated between secular and ecclesiastic nobles, and at least one Chancellor (both in the Grand and Deputy pair and in the Crown and Lithuanian one after the Union of Lublin) was required to be a secular person.

== Power and responsibilities ==
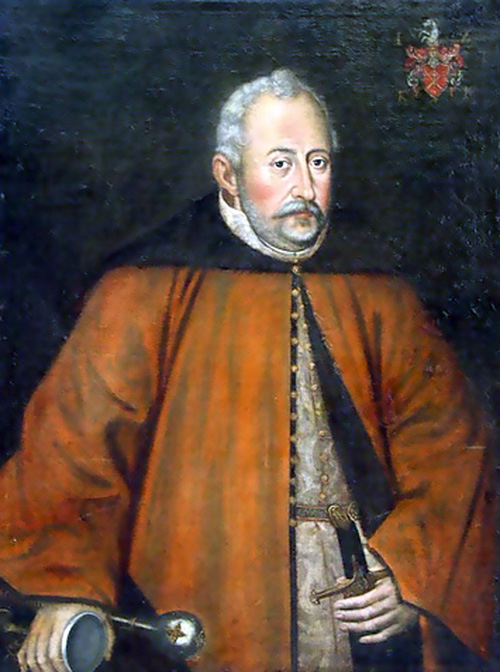
Jan Zamoyski (1542–1605), Grand Chancellor and adviser to Stefan Batory, the third elected king of Poland.

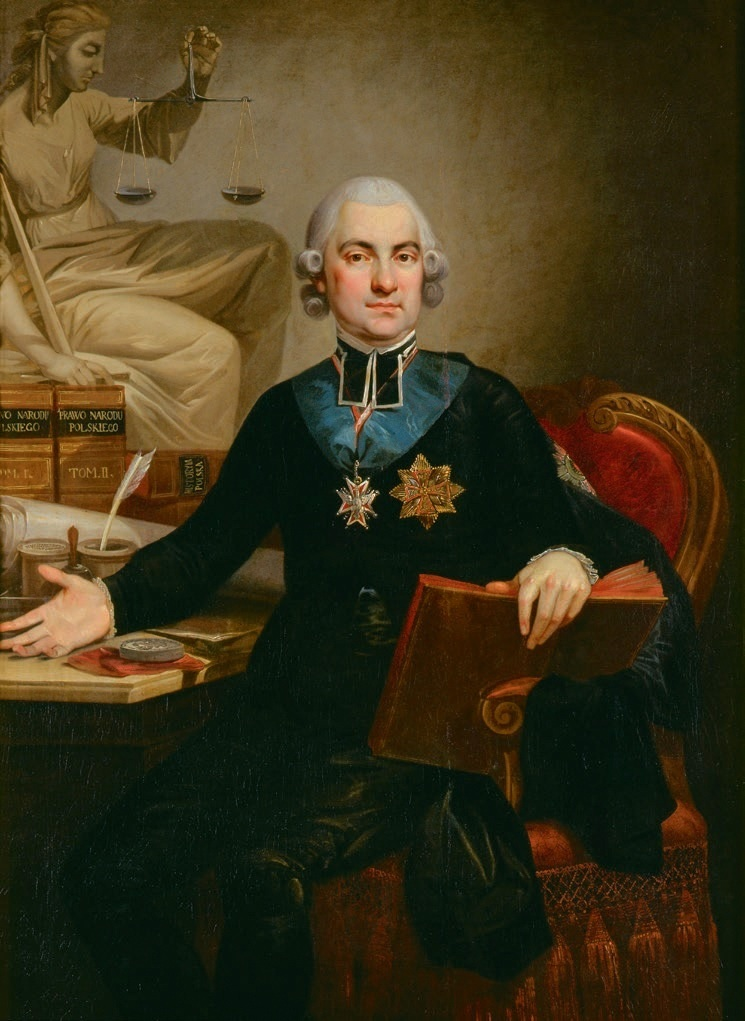
Hugo Kołłątaj (1750–1812), Vice-Chancellor, co-author of the Constitution of 3 May 1791.

Chancellors, as most of the other offices in Poland and later, the Commonwealth, were nominated to the office for life by the King during the Sejm (Parliament) session. From the 15th and 16th centuries, after the reforms of Alexander, Sigismund I and the Union of Lublin, the power and importance of the Chancellor's office was stabilised, as a senatorial office lesser than that of the hetmans (military commanders who had, however, no right to vote in the Senate) and the Grand Marshals, but more important than that of the Grand Treasurers, Court Marshal and others.

By custom, the Grand Chancellor of the Crown directed the Commonwealth foreign policies towards the west – Western Europe and south – Ottoman Empire, while the Grand Chancellor of Lithuania the policies towards the east – Muscovy (later, the Russian Empire).

The Chancellor and Vice-Chancellor were responsible for the work of their chancelleries, Grand and Deputy respectively. They were supposed to be in constant contact and develop common policies, since their powers were equal. They were specifically forbidden from issuing illegal and contradictory documents, and could judge any documents contrary to the existing law 'irrelevant and without power'. In theory, the power of the Chancellors were equal. In practice, much depended on their personalities and political influence. Conflicts between Chancellors, while rare, when it occurred, could paralyse the entire country. This was the case during the conflict between Krzesław z Kurozwęk and Maciej Drzewicki between 1501 and 1503.

Among their other responsibilities were the matters of foreign policy (correspondence with other countries) and to a smaller extent, internal affairs, as they had also judiciary powers, presiding over the 'assessors' courts' (Polish: Asesoria), that were the highest appeal courts for people subjected to crown laws (i.e. not subjected to ecclesiastic or magnates courts, but when a chancellor was an ecclesiastic person, he could judge the priests of the king's court). They could judge in various cases, with the exception of when the sides had already reached a compromise or in cases of territorial disputes.

The Chancellors' offices were the chancelleries (Crown and Lithuanian respectively). Chancelleries were staffed with officials known as the chancellists (Polish: kancelista): the regent (regent kancelarii), secretaries (sekretarz in Crown)^{1}, writers (pisarz in Lithuania, equivalent to the secretary in Crown), archivists (Polish: archiwista), metricants (Polish: metrykant) and other clerks. The Regent divided the work between the clerks. 2 secretaries (one responsible for private correspondence, the second for official) presented prepared letters to the king for his signature. Writers designed the letters; clerks readied the final drafts. No copies were made, but were instead entered in the archives – books called Metrics (Polish: Metryki), who were taken care of by the two metricans (2 in Poland and 2 in Lithuania respectively). The Metrican of the Grand Chancellor was called the Grand Metrican, one serving the Vice-Chancellor was a Minor Metrican. The Chancellery staff had no wages, just like the Chancellors, but in the middle of each reception room was the box into which all clients were supposed to deposit a varying amount of money, and nobody who planned on coming back could afford to be mean. Of much smaller importance were the local, provincial chancelleries, which mostly served as archives for copies of various documents.

Besides their official functions, the royal chancelleries functioned as a kind of semi-official, very prestigious schools. The officials of the chancelleries, who often started their work after their studies, after several years of work, often went forward in the administrative hierarchy, often reaching important posts of bishops or other ecclesiastic or secular offices. Many enlightened chancellors did not restrict the positions in their staff to nobility (szlachta), and often sponsored intelligent applicants from other social classes, not only by hiring them to the chancellery but by paying for their studies at universities in Poland and abroad. Among the most esteemed 'graduates' of chancelleries were Jan Długosz, Martin Kromer and Jan Zamoyski.

The Chancellor often gave speeches representing the royal will. The symbol of their office was the seal, which was used to seal all documents passing through his office. He also sealed documents signed by the monarch and could refuse to seal a document he considered illegal or damaging to the country (such documents had no power without his seal). When the king died, the seal was destroyed during the funeral and a new one given to him by the succeeding king. The seal's importance gave a rise to another name for the Chancellor – the sealer (Polish pieczętarz). Due to their important power the Chancellors were considered the guardians of the king and country, making sure a king's folly would not endanger the country by forcing it into an unnecessary war (among the wars prevented by the chancellors was a great crusade against the Ottoman Empire planned by King Władysław IV in the 1630s).

The chancellor's powers combined with the fact that wars required funds which were given by the Senat. The nobles (the szlachta) who controlled the Senate were usually unwilling to increase taxes and levied upon them, which meant that Poland very rarely declared wars on its own. Usually it was attacked by its neighbors, and while it repelled all attacks till the end of the 18th century, it almost never utilized any of its victories. The army was undermanned and under equipped (since usually any suggestion of bigger military budget when enemy was not on the doorstep was labeled as warmongering) and lands of Rzeczpospolita were constantly ravaged by new invasions, crippling its economy.

== Other chancellors ==
There were many less important chancellors in the country. There was the Chancellor of the Queen. He had much less power than other (King's) Chancellors, he guarded the queen's seal and was the second most important official of her court, after her Court Marshall. He had no right to a seat in the Senate. Even less important were the chancellors of crown princes and princesses, first introduced around the reign of Sigismund I. Then there was the chancellor of the most important of bishops, Primate of Poland, Archbishop of Gniezno. Finally some proud magnates had officials who titled themselves chancellors.

== Official distinctions ==
- Kanclerz – Chancellor – various local chancellors, until late 14th to early 15th century
- Kanclerz krakowski – Chancellor of Kraków – until the 14th century, when he superseded all other Polish local chancellors and transformed into
- Kanclerz koronny – Chancellor of the Crown – from the 14th century until 1569. Sometimes also called Kanclerz Królestwa Polskiego – Chancellor of the Polish Kingdom
- Kanclerz wielki koronny – Great Chancellor of the Crown – from 1569 until 1795 (end of the Commonwealth)
- Kanclerz wielki litewski – Great Chancellor of Lithuania – as above
- Podkanclerzy koronny – Vice-Chancellor of the Crown – as above
- Podkanclerzy litewski – Vice-Chancellor of Lithuania – as above

== List of Chancellors ==
Portrait	Name	Lifespan	Term began	Term ended
	Jan	?	1107	1112
	Michał Awdaniec	?	1112	1113
	Goswin	?	1113	1138
	Lupus	?	1138	1145
	Pean	died in 1152	1145	1152
	Cherubin	died in 1180	1152	1172
	Klemens	?	1172	1173
	Stefan	?	1173	1206
	Iwo Odrowąż	died 21 August 1229	1206	1208
	Wincenty z Niałka	died in 1232	1208	1211
	Jarost	?	1211	1212
	Marcin	?	1212	1213
	Nanker	died in 1250	1213	1241
	Wawrzęta Gutowski	?	1241	1243
	Rambold	?	1243	1262
	Paweł z Przemankowa	died on 29 November 1292	1262	1266
	Stanisław z Krakowa	?	1266	1270
	Prokop	died in 1295	1270	1280
	Andrzej Zaremba	died in 1318	1280	1290
	Wincenty	?	1290	1296
	Jan	died on 26 August 1296	1296	1296
	Piotr Angeli	?	1296	1306
	Franciszek z Krakowa	?	1306	1320
	Zbigniew z Szczyrzyca	?	1320	1356
	Janusz Suchywilk	1310 – 5 April 1382	1357	1373
	Zawisza Kurozwęcki	died on 12 January 1382	1373	1379
	Jan Radlica	died on 12 January 1392	1380	1386
	Mikołaj Zaklika	died in 1408	1386	1404
	Mikołaj Kurowski	1355–1411	1404	1411
	Wojciech Jastrzębiec	1362–1436	1411	1423
	Jan Szafraniec	1363 – 28 July 1433	1423	1433
	Jan Taszka Koniecpolski	died on 26 March 1455	1433 or 1434	1454
	Jan Gruszczyński	1405 – 8 October 1473	1454	1469
	Jakub Dembiński	1427 – 15 January 1490	1469	1473
	Uriel Górka	1435 – 21 January 1498	1473	1479
	Stanisław Kurozwęcki	1440–1482	1479	1482
	Krzesław Kurozwęcki	1440–1503	1483	1503
	Jan Łaski	1456 – 19 May 1531	1503	1510
	Maciej Drzewicki	22 February 1467 – 22 August 1535	1510	1513
	Krzysztof Szydłowiecki	1467–1532	1513 or 1515	1532
	Jan Chojeński	17 March 1486 – 11 March 1538	1532	1538
	Paweł Dunin-Wolski	1487–1546	1539	1540
	Tomasz Sobocki	1508–1547	1540	1541
	Samuel Maciejowski	15 January 1499 – 26 October 1550	1541	1550
	Jan Ocieski	1501 – 12 May 1563	1550 or 1552	1563
	Walenty Dembiński	died in 1585	1564	1576
	Piotr Dunin-Wolski	1531–1590	1576	1578
	Jan Zamoyski	19 March 1542 – 3 June 1605	1578	1605
	Maciej Pstrokoński	1553–1609	1606	1609
	Wawrzyniec Gembicki	5 August 1559 – 10 February 1624	1609	1613
	Feliks Kryski	1562–1618	1613	1618
	Stanisław Żółkiewski	1547 – 7 October 1620	1618	1620
	Andrzej Lipski	1572 – 4 September 1631	1620	1623
	Wacław Leszczyński	1576 – 17 May 1628	1625	1628
	Jakub Zadzik	1582 – 17 March 1642	1628	1635
	Tomasz Zamoyski	1594 – 7 January 1638	1635	1635
	Piotr Gembicki	10 October 1585 – 14 July 1657	1635	1643
	Jerzy Ossoliński	15 December 1595 – 9 August 1650	1643	1650
	Andrzej Leszczyński	1608–1658	1650	1652
	Stefan Koryciński	1617 – 4 July 1658	1652	1658
	Mikołaj Prażmowski	1617 – 15 April 1673	1658	1666
	Jan Leszczyński	1603–1678	1666	1678
	Jan Stefan Wydżga	1610 – 6 September 1685	1678	1678
	Jan Wielopolski	1630 – 15 February 1688	1678	1688
	Jerzy Albrecht Denhoff	1640–1702	1688	1702
	Karol Tarło	1639–1702	1702	1702
	Andrzej Chryzostom Załuski	1650 – 12 May 1711	1702	1706
	Jan Stanisław Jabłonowski	1669 – 28 April 1731	1706	1709
	Jan Szembek	died on 9 April 1731	1712	1731
	Andrzej Stanisław Załuski	2 December 1695 – 16 December 1758	1735	1746
	Jan Małachowski	26 January 1698 – 25 June 1762	1746	1762
	Andrzej Zamoyski	12 February 1716 – 10 February 1792	1764	1767
	Andrzej Młodziejowski	1717–1780	1767	1780
	Jan Andrzej Borch	1715–1780	1780	1780
	Antoni Onufry Okęcki	13 June 1729 – 15 June 1793	1780	1786
	Jacek Małachowski	25 August 1737 – 27 March 1821	1786	1793
	Antoni Sułkowski	11 June 1735 – 16 April 1796	1793	1795

== See also ==
- Offices in the Polish–Lithuanian Commonwealth
- Hetmans of the Polish–Lithuanian Commonwealth
- General Military Chancellery, the highest administrative office in the Ukrainian Cossack Hetmanate, modelled on the Chancellery of Poland

== Notes ==
1. Secretaries in Crown and writers in Lithuania were often just an honorary title given to people for their service to the state in the areas of administration and such. The normal secretaries should not be confused with the Great Secretaries, who served as Chancellors when the Chancellors were absent, but had no right to vote in the Senat.
