= Porąbka, Limanowa County =

Porąbka
- Village
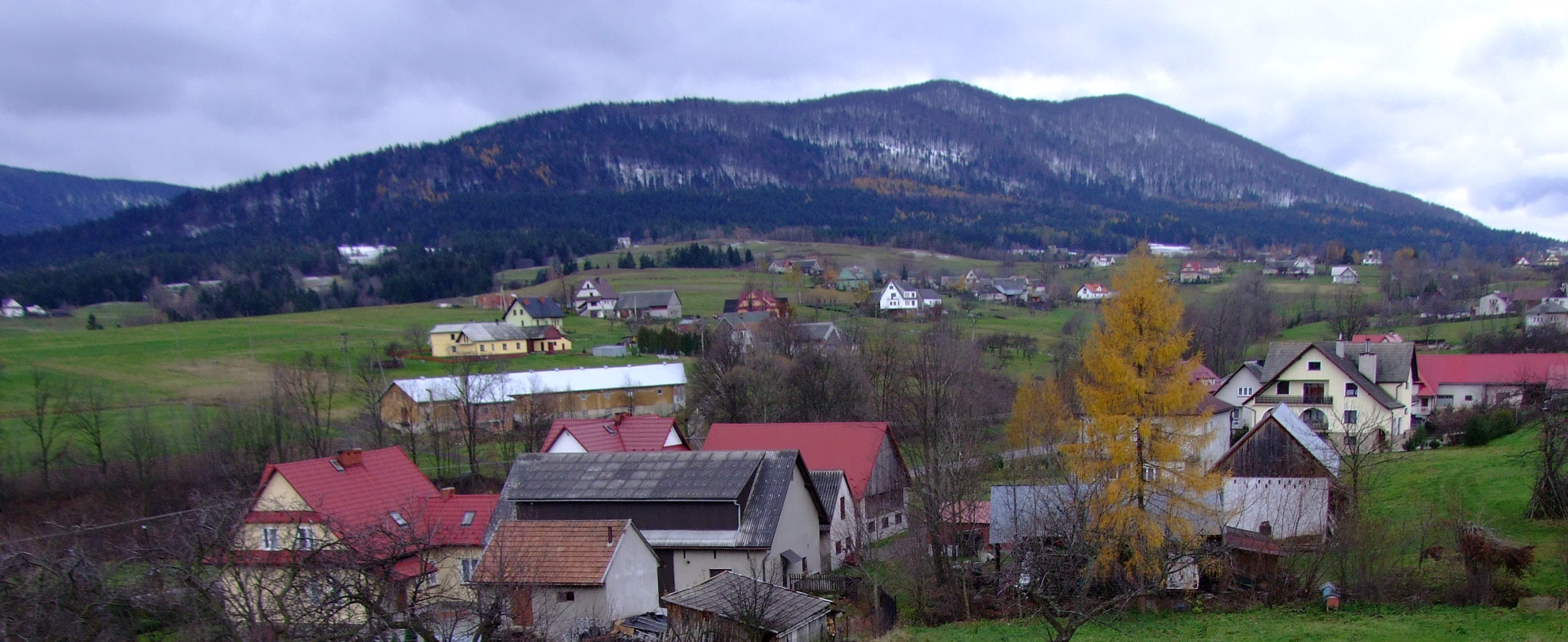

- Location within Poland
- Coordinates: 49°43′32″N 20°12′56″E
- Country: Poland
- Voivodeship: Lesser Poland
- County: Limanowa
- Gmina: Dobra

Porąbka [pɔˈrɔmpka] is a village in the administrative district of Gmina Dobra, within Limanowa County, Lesser Poland Voivodeship, in southern Poland.
