= Łętowe =

- Village
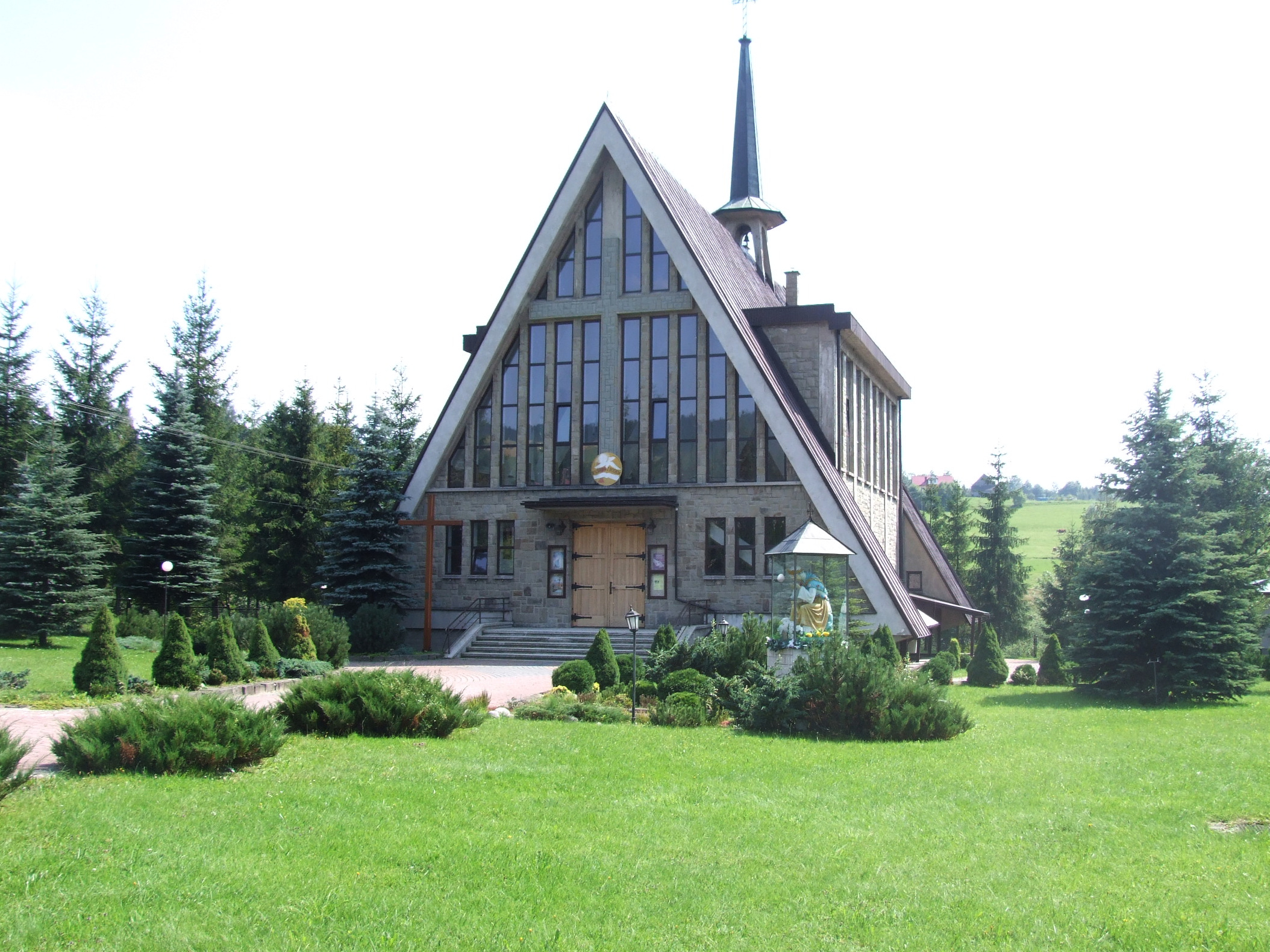
- Church in Łętowe

- Location within Poland
- Coordinates: 49°38′47″N 20°8′19″E
- Country: Poland
- Voivodeship: Lesser Poland
- County: Limanowa
- Gmina: Mszana Dolna
- Population (2011): 1,184

Łętowe [wɛnˈtɔvɛ] is a village in the administrative district of Gmina Mszana Dolna, within Limanowa County, Lesser Poland Voivodeship, in southern Poland.
