= Półrzeczki =

- Village
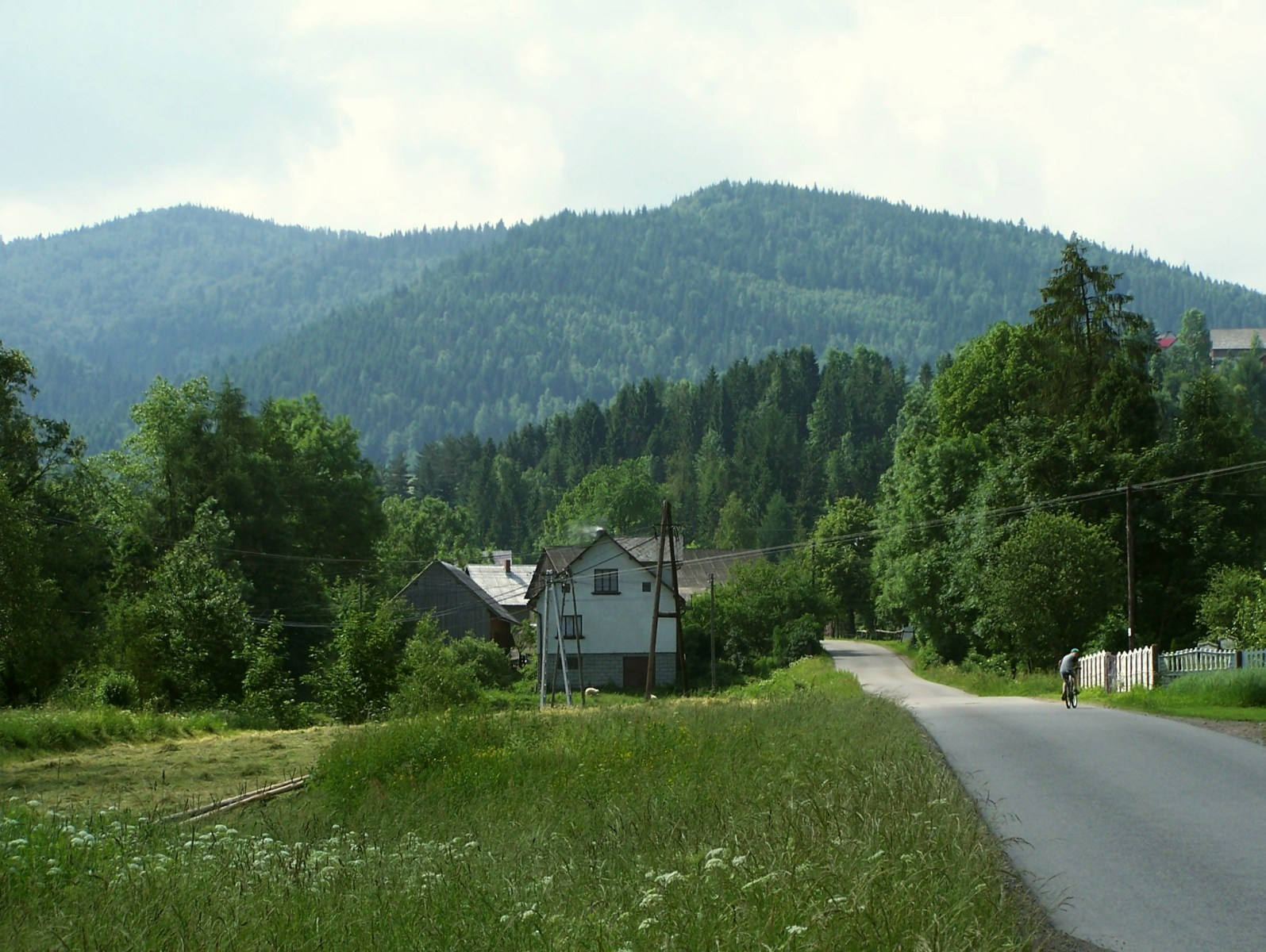

- Location within Poland
- Coordinates: 49°40′N 20°14′E
- Country: Poland
- Voivodeship: Lesser Poland
- County: Limanowa
- Gmina: Dobra
- Population: 610

Półrzeczki [puu̯ˈʐɛt͡ʂki] is a village in the administrative district of Gmina Dobra, within Limanowa County, Lesser Poland Voivodeship, in southern Poland.
