= Kasina Wielka =

- Village
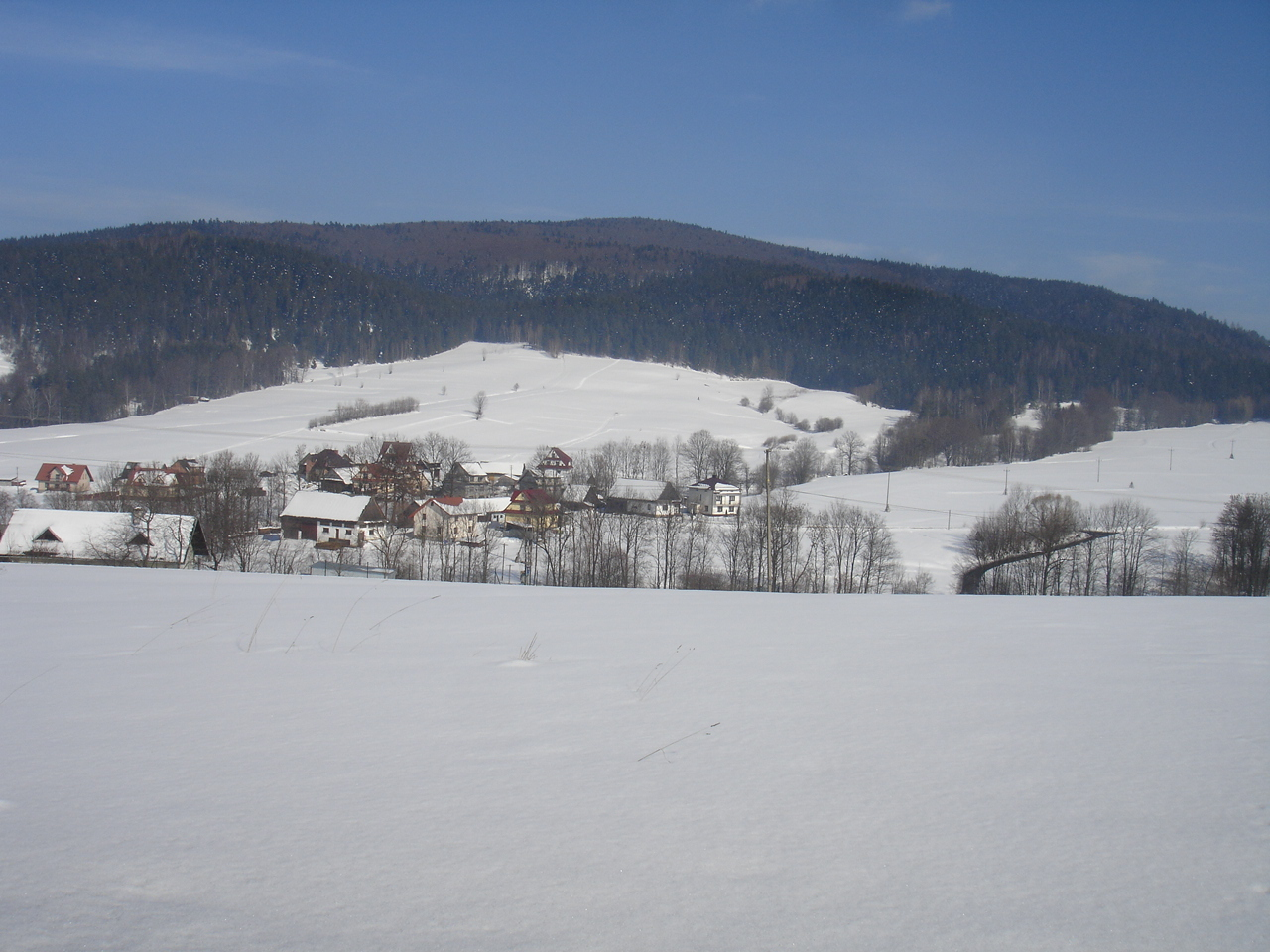
- Kasina Wielka

- Location within Poland
- Coordinates: 49°43′16″N 20°8′19″E
- Country: Poland
- Voivodeship: Lesser Poland
- County: Limanowa
- Gmina: Mszana Dolna
- Highest elevation: 570 m (1,870 ft)
- Lowest elevation: 480 m (1,570 ft)
- Population: 2,800

Kasina Wielka [kaˈɕina ˈvjɛlka] is a village in the administrative district of Gmina Mszana Dolna, within Limanowa County, Lesser Poland Voivodeship, in southern Poland.
