= Gmina Dobra, Lesser Poland Voivodeship =

Gmina Dobra Dobra Commune
- Gmina
- Flag Coat of arms
- Interactive map of Gmina Dobra
- Coordinates (Dobra): 49°42′50″N 20°15′10″E
- Country: Poland
- Voivodeship: Lesser Poland
- County: Limanowa
- Seat: Dobra

Area
  - Total: 109.05 km^{2} (42.10 sq mi)

Population (2006)
  - Total: 9,322
  - Density: 85.48/km^{2} (221.4/sq mi)
- Website: http://www.dobra.iap.pl/

Gmina Dobra is a rural gmina (administrative district) in Limanowa County, Lesser Poland Voivodeship, in southern Poland. Its seat is the village of Dobra, which lies approximately 13 kilometres (8 mi) west of Limanowa and 45 km (28 mi) south-east of the regional capital Kraków.

The gmina covers an area of 109.05 square kilometres (42.1 sq mi), and as of 2006 its total population is 9,322.

== Villages ==
Gmina Dobra contains the villages and settlements of Chyszówki, Dobra, Gruszowiec, Jurków, Półrzeczki, Porąbka, Przenosza, Skrzydlna, Stróża, Wilczyce and Wola Skrzydlańska.

== Neighbouring gminas ==
Gmina Dobra is bordered by the gminas of Jodłownik, Kamienica, Mszana Dolna, Słopnice, Tymbark and Wiśniowa.
