= Jacek Małachowski =

Polish nobleman (1737–1821)

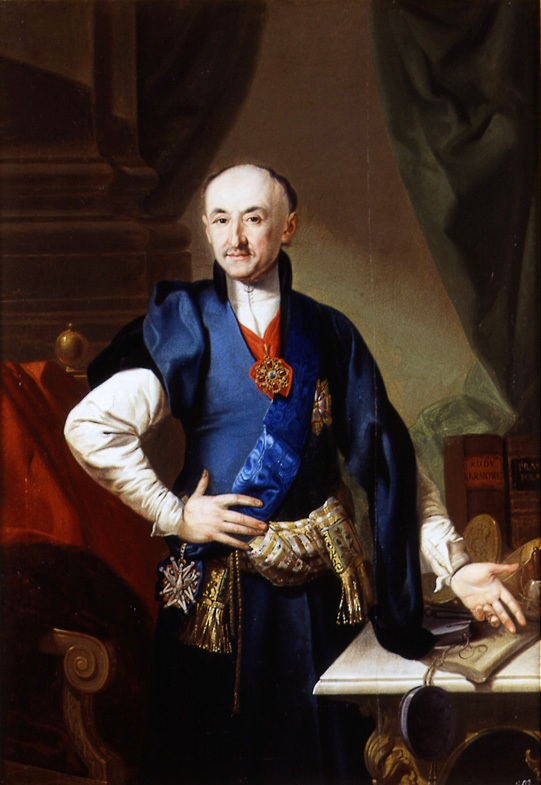
- Portrait by Józef Peszka
- Coat of arms: Nałęcz
- Born: 25 August 1737; Końskie
- Died: 27 March 1821 (aged 83); Bodzechów
- Family: House of Małachowski
- Consort: Petronela Antonina Rzewuska
- Issue: Jan Małachowski; Franciszka Małachowska
- Father: Jan Małachowski
- Mother: Izabela Humiecka

Jacek Małachowski (Polish pronunciation: [ˈjat͡sɛk mawaˈxɔfskʲi]; 25 August 1737 – 27 March 1821) was a Polish nobleman, politician and administrator as well as Polish chancellor. He was the son of Jan Małachowski, also a Polish chancellor. One of his four brothers was Count Stanisław Małachowski, who was a prime force behind the Constitution of 1791.

He was Crown Deputy Master of the Pantry since 1764. Referendary of the Crown in 1764–1780, Deputy Chancellor the Crown since 1780 and Grand Chancellor of the Crown since 1786. Starost of Piotrków, Radom, Stary Sącz and Gródek.

Marshal of the Coronation Sejm in 3–20 December 1764 in Warsaw.

He was a supporter of the Russian faction. During the Great Sejm of 1788-1792 he supported tentative reforms such as strengthening of the executive and army, but also maintaining ties with Russia. He was among the opponents of the Constitution of 3 May and eventually joined the Targowica Confederation that overthrew it.

In 1804 he founded a factory that was one of the origins of the Ćmielów Porcelain Factory.
