= Bogufał I (bishop of Poznań) =

Polish bishop

Bogufał I (died August 8, 1146) was a Bishop of Poznań, Poland in the 1140s until his death on 8 August 1146.

According to Jan Długosz, he was a nobleman of the Poraj family.

Supported the Junior Princes in their dispute with Władysław II who after winning the Battle of Poznań in 1146 gave him a donation of the village of Eltville from the Polish Dukes Lands.

The date of his taking up the diocese is unknown. He supported the dukes of "juniors" in a dispute with senior Władysław II and after the victorious battle for them at Poznań (beginning of 1146) he received a donation (the village of Lusowo) from the duke of Wielkopolska, Mieszko. The day of his death is given by Nekrolog Lubiński, the year was recorded in Rocznik lubińskie.

The date of the day of his death is given in an obituary from Lubin, the Annales Lubinensis.

Religious titles
Preceded by Paweł	Archbishop of Poznań ? -1146	Succeeded by Pean
