= Jurków, Limanowa County =

Jurków
- Village
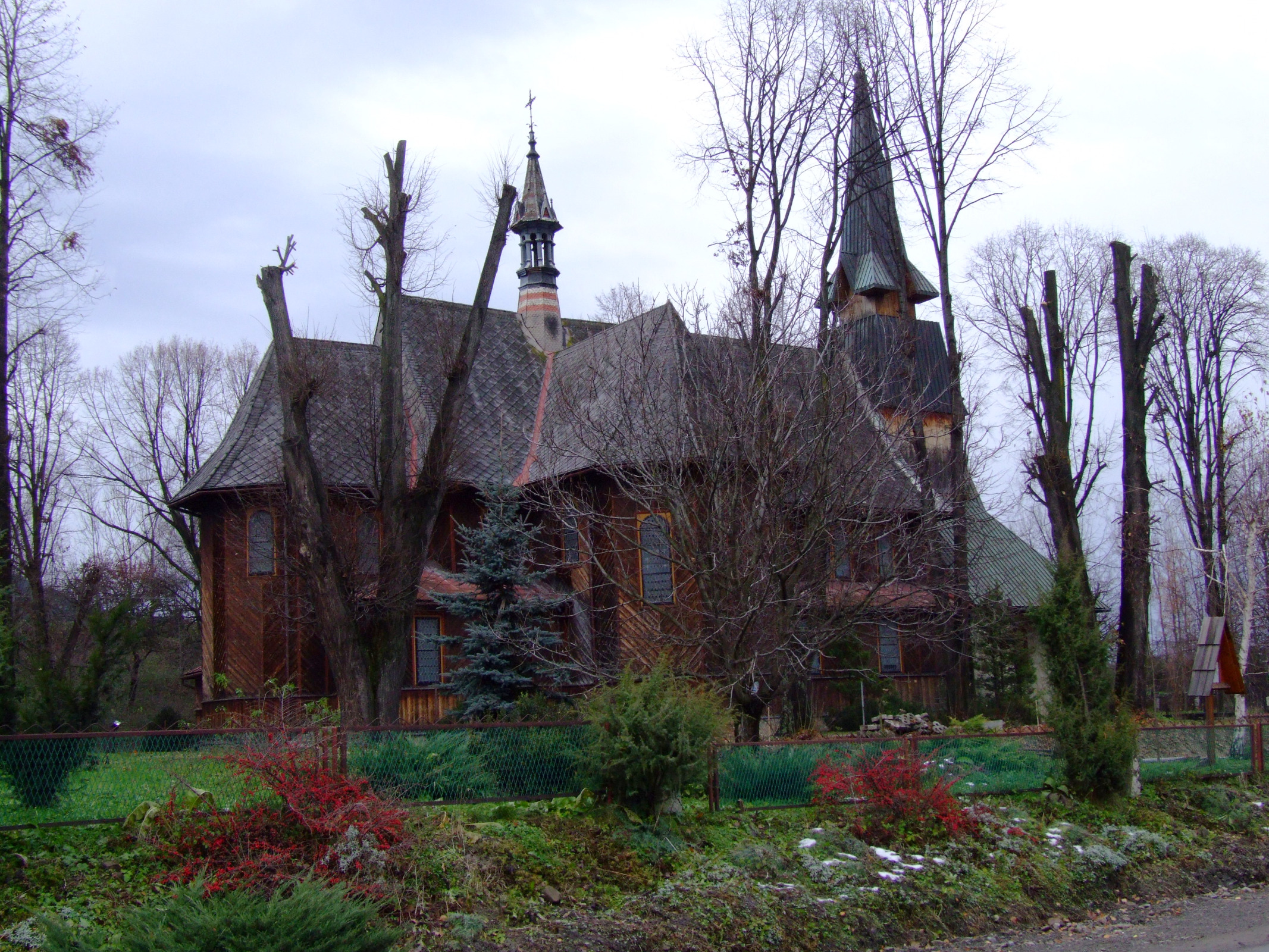
- Wooden church in Jurków

- Location within Poland
- Coordinates: 49°41′N 20°14′E
- Country: Poland
- Voivodeship: Lesser Poland
- County: Limanowa
- Gmina: Dobra
- Elevation: 550 m (1,800 ft)
- Population: 1,249

Jurków [ˈjurkuf] is a village in the administrative district of Gmina Dobra, within Limanowa County, Lesser Poland Voivodeship, in southern Poland.
