= Gruszowiec =

- Village
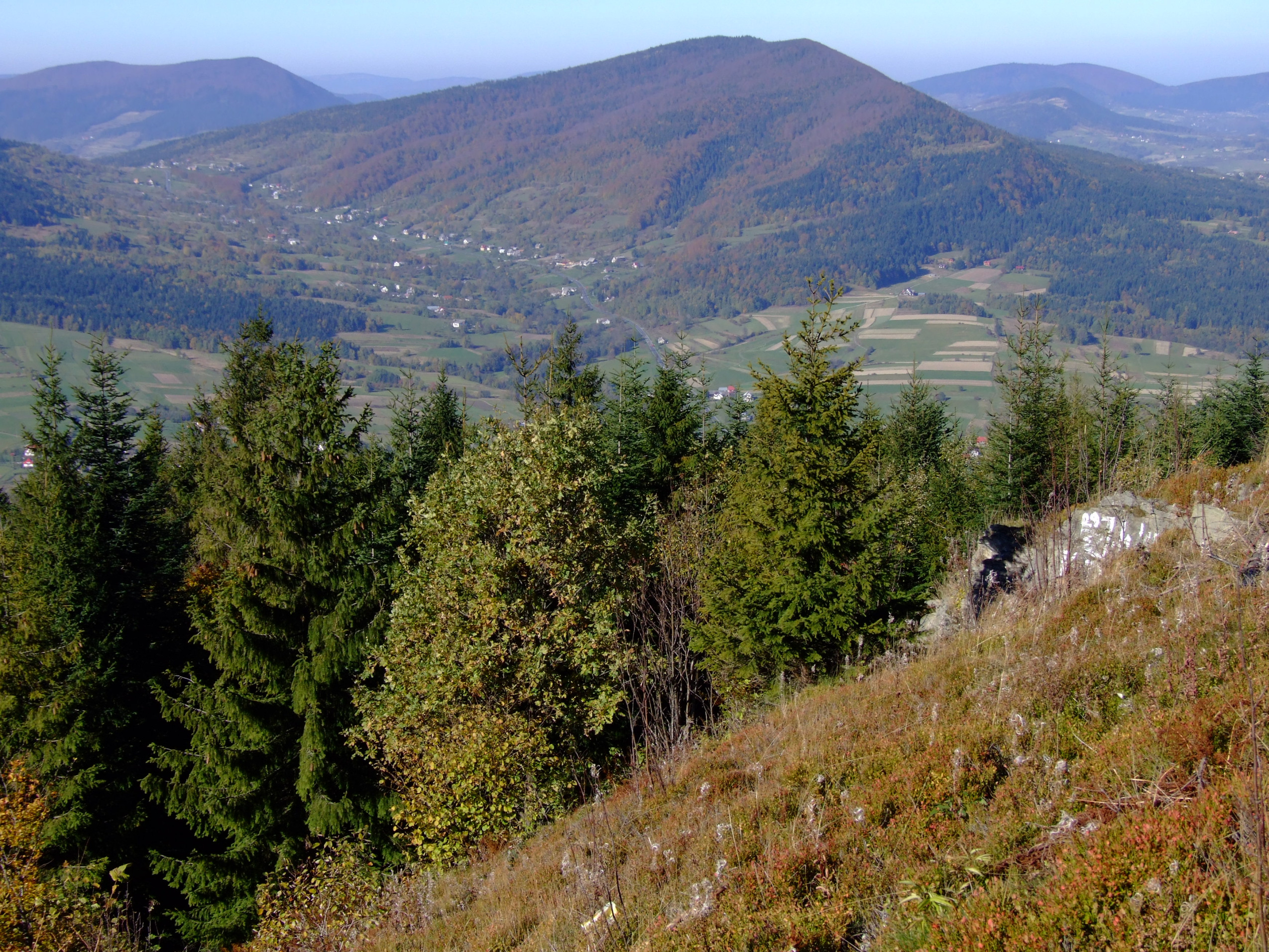

- Location within Poland
- Coordinates: 49°42′N 20°12′E
- Country: Poland
- Voivodeship: Lesser Poland
- County: Limanowa
- Gmina: Dobra

Gruszowiec [ɡruˈʂɔvjɛt͡s] is a village in the administrative district of Gmina Dobra, within Limanowa County, Lesser Poland Voivodeship, in southern Poland.
