= Dobra, Lesser Poland Voivodeship =

Dobra
- Village
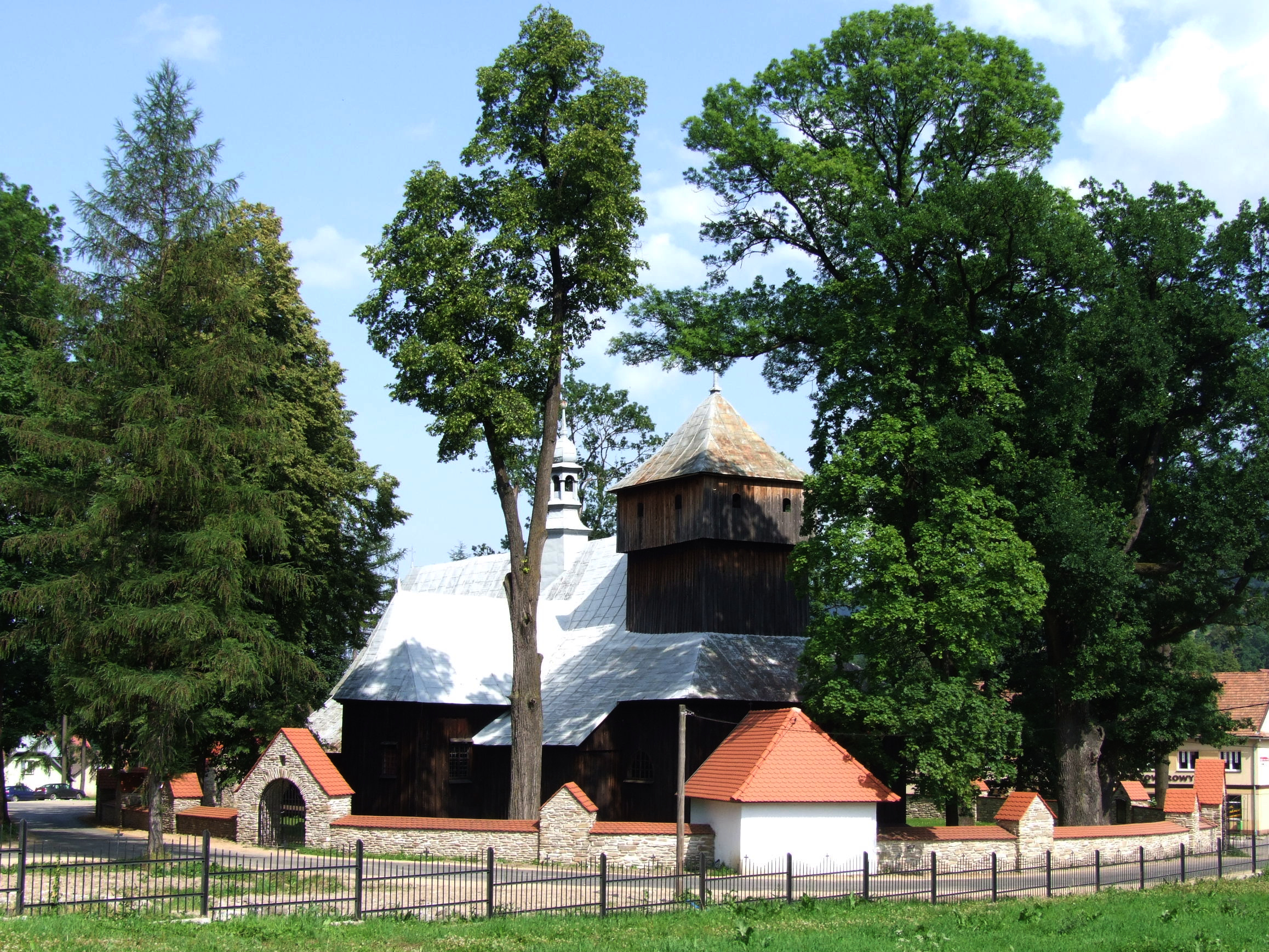
- Old church

- Location within Poland
- Coordinates: 49°42′50″N 20°15′10″E
- Country: Poland
- Voivodeship: Lesser Poland
- County: Limanowa
- Gmina: Dobra
- Population: 3,217

Dobra [ˈdɔbra] is a village in Limanowa County, Lesser Poland Voivodeship, in southern Poland. It is the seat of the gmina (administrative district) called Gmina Dobra.
