= Lubomierz, Limanowa County =

Lubomierz
- Village
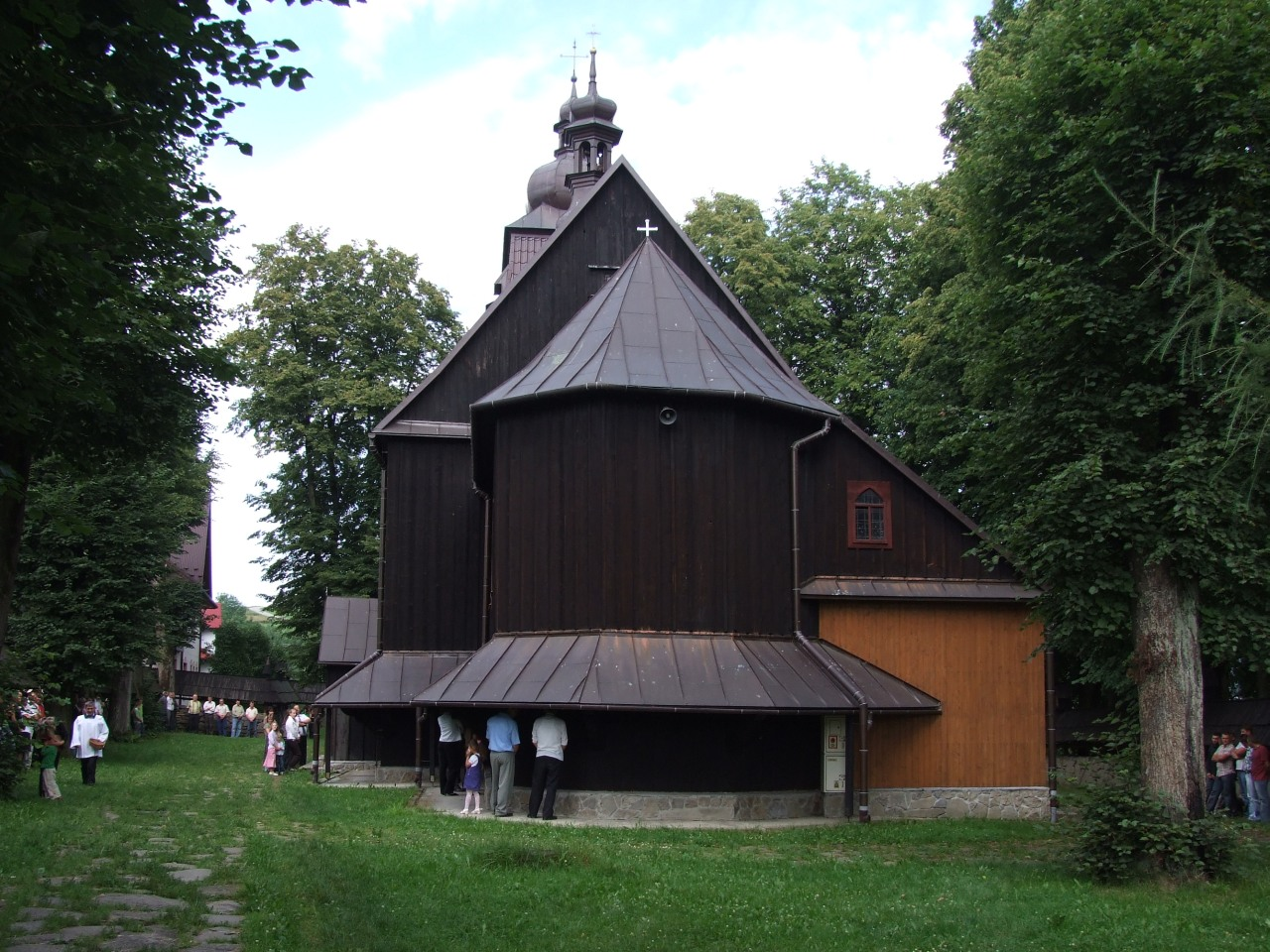
- Church of Saint Joseph

- Location within Poland
- Coordinates: 49°36′45″N 20°11′42″E
- Country: Poland
- Voivodeship: Lesser Poland
- County: Limanowa
- Gmina: Mszana Dolna
- Highest elevation: 750 m (2,460 ft)
- Lowest elevation: 550 m (1,800 ft)

Population
  - Total: 1,750

Lubomierz [luˈbɔmjɛʂ] is a village in the administrative district of Gmina Mszana Dolna, within Limanowa County, Lesser Poland Voivodeship, in southern Poland.

Lubomierz has a municipality called Rzeki, located eastward on the road to Szczawa. The settlement was founded in the 17th century. It used to be the location of the Gorce National Park headquarters, set up at a remote hunting lodge.
