= Chyszówki =

- Village
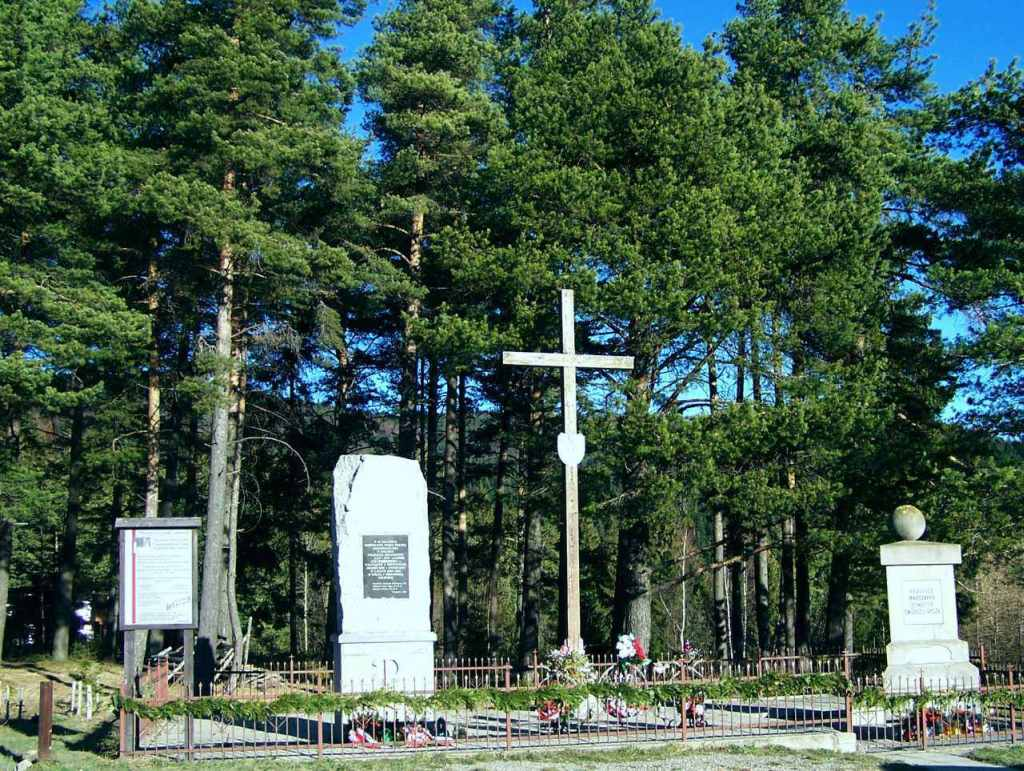
- Monument of Rydz-Śmigły, Chyszówki

- Location within Poland
- Coordinates: 49°40′00″N 20°15′19″E
- Country: Poland
- Voivodeship: Lesser Poland
- County: Limanowa
- Gmina: Dobra
- Population: 685

Chyszówki [xɨˈʂufki] is a village in the administrative district of Gmina Dobra, within Limanowa County, Lesser Poland Voivodeship, in southern Poland.
