= Godzimir Małachowski =

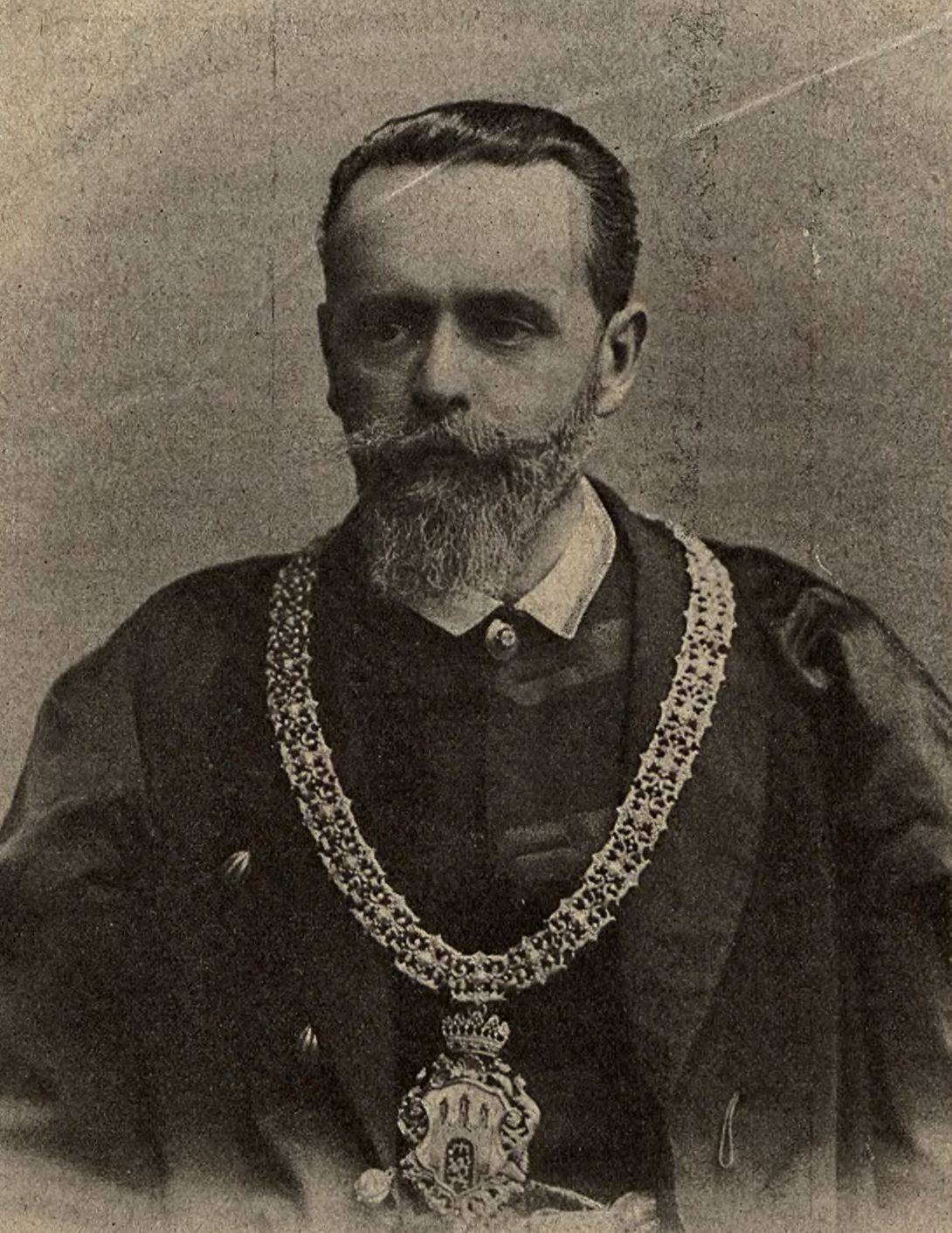
Godzimir Małachowski as President of Lwów (1896–1905)

Godzimir Małachowski of Nałęcz (1852–1908) was a Polish lawyer, university professor and President of Lviv.

An heir of the powerful Małachowski family, he was also a member of the Austro-Hungarian parliament, the Galicia Diet and one of the best-known presidents of the city of Lwów (modern Lviv, Ukraine). During his presidency (1897–1905) the city was expanded significantly. Also, Małachowski sponsored numerous new facilities, such as the Grand Theatre, monument to Adam Mickiewicz and the monument to John III of Poland (after the annexation of Lwów by the Soviet Union the monument was moved to Gdańsk).
