= Stanisław Małachowski =

Polish statesman

Count Stanisław Małachowski
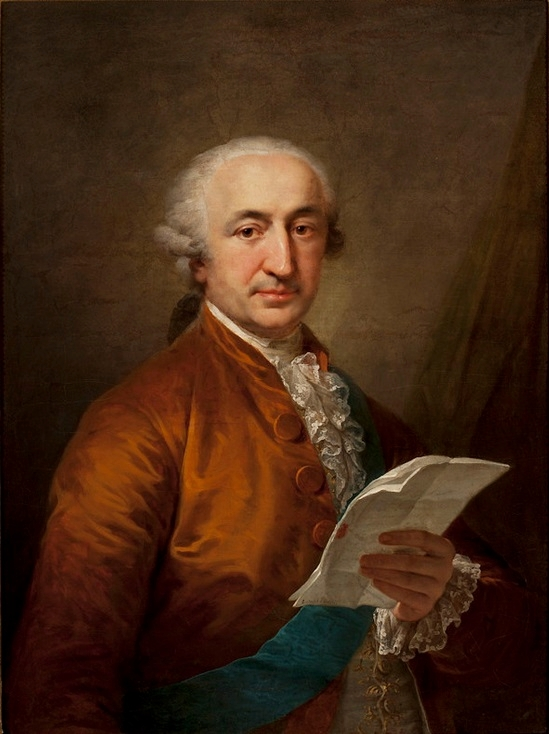
- Portrait by Johann Baptist von Lampi the Elder

1st Prime Minister of Duchy of Warsaw
- In office 5 October – 14 December 1807
- Monarch: Frederick Augustus I
- Preceded by: Office established
- Succeeded by: Ludwik Szymon Gutakowski
- In office Acting: 14 January 1807 – 5 October 1807
- Monarchs: vacant Frederick Augustus I (since 7 July)

Sejm Marshal of the Polish-Lithuanian Commonwealth
- In office 1788–1792
- Monarch: Stanisław II August
- Preceded by: Stanisław Kostka Gadomski
- Succeeded by: Stanisław Kostka Bieliński

Personal details
- Born: 24 August 1736 Końskie, Polish–Lithuanian Commonwealth
- Died: 29 December 1809 (aged 73) Warsaw, Duchy of Warsaw
- Party: Patriotic Party (1788-1792)
- Spouse(s): Urszula Hutten-Czapska; Konstancja Hutten-Czapska
- Parent: Jan Małachowski (father)
- Profession: Nobleman, politician

Count Stanisław Małachowski, of the Nałęcz coat-of-arms (Polish pronunciation: [staˈɲiswaf mawaˈxɔfskʲi]; 1736–1809) was a Polish statesman, the first Prime Minister of Poland, a member of the Polish government's Permanent Council (Rada Nieustająca) (1776–1780), Marshal of the Crown Courts of Justice from 1774, Crown Grand Referendary (1780–1792) and Marshal of the Four-Year Sejm (1788–1792).

The son of Jan Małachowski, the royal grand chancellor, Małachowski was named marshal (speaker) of the Sejm (Diet) in 1788. He was the prime force behind the constitution, adopted in 1791, that embodied such modern Western European reforms as majority rule in parliament, separation of powers, and enfranchisement of the middle classes; this constitution was abrogated at the Second Partition of Poland in 1792. In 1807–1809 Małachowski served as president of the senate (government) of the Duchy of Warsaw, promoted by Napoleon Bonaparte.

== Biography ==
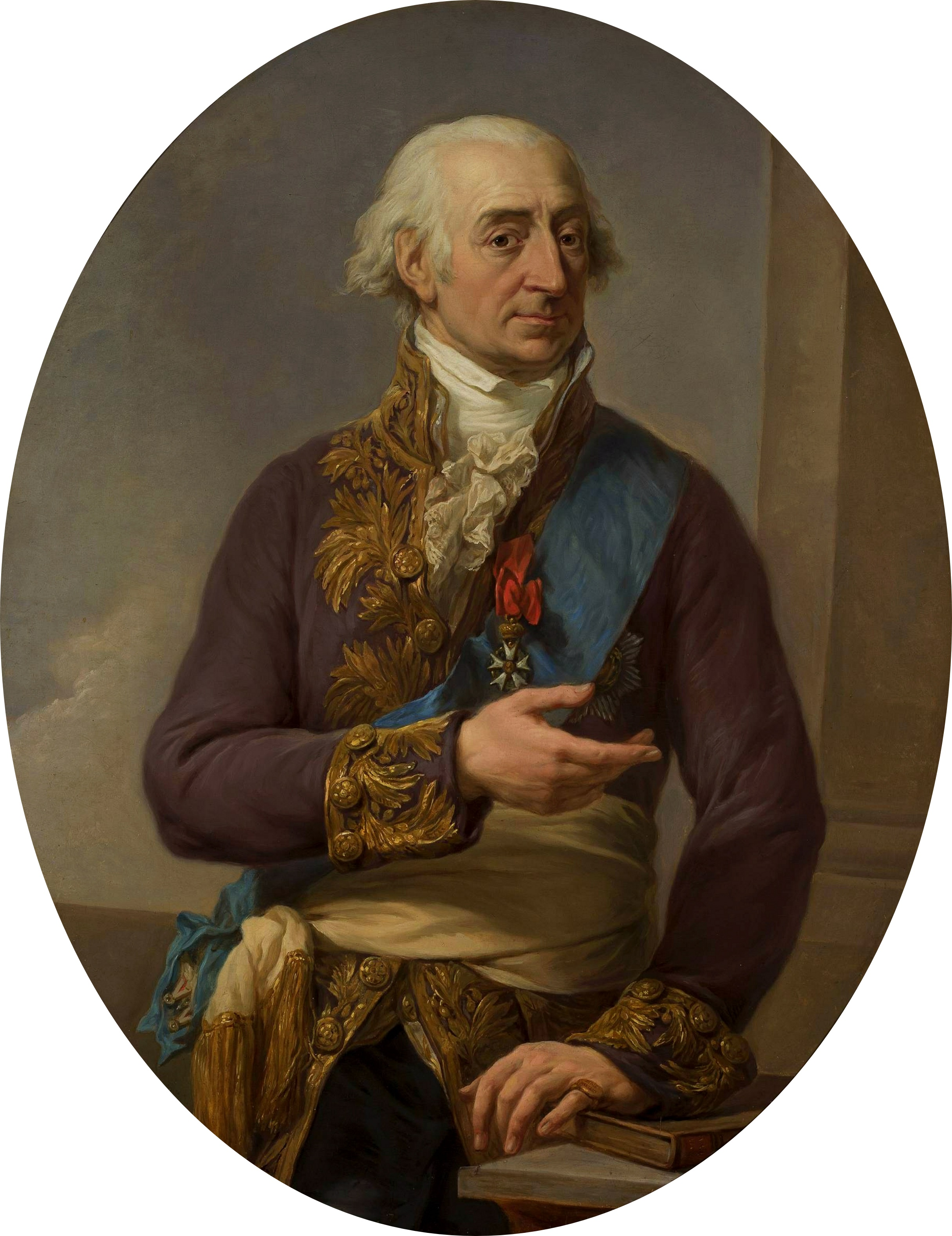
Małachowski by Marcello Bacciarelli

Born on 24 August 1736, Stanisław Małachowski came from a wealthy, powerful and influential noble family and was the son of statesman and nobleman Jan Małachowski, and the grandson of the like-named Stanisław Małachowski (zm. 1699). He studied law and was elected provincial deputy to the Sejm in 1764. In 1771, he was appointed clerk of the United Polish crown. As a member of the House of Deputies in the Sejm, he earned great respect. He was a member of the Permanent Council of the Government and was appointed Marshal (President) of the Four-year Sejm (1788-1792). In this capacity, he was one of the main authors of the Constitution of 3 May 1791. He signed, as Marshal of the Sejm in 1790, the treaty of alliance with Prussia with the aim to protect Poland from foreign domination.

In 1792, he negotiated in vain with a Saxon delegation on the introduction of the hereditary transmission of the Polish crown to the King of Saxony. Małachowski was stricter than patriot opponents of the Russian party, whose main proponents scored his brother Hyacinth Małachowski. During the Russo-Polish war of 1792, he provided substantial funds and large quantities of food for the Polish troops available from his own resources. But since he could not prevent the pro-Russian Targowica Confederation, he fled abroad. He did not take part in the Kościuszko Uprising of 1794. In 1799, he was nevertheless arrested in Warsaw and imprisoned for a year in Kraków as a state prisoner, being accused of responsibility for a meeting of the Polish Sejm in Milan. After the founding of the Grand Duchy of Warsaw in 1807, he was first chairman of a provisional government commission and soon became President of the Senate.

Małachowski died on 28 December 1809 and his tomb is located in the Holy Cross Church in Warsaw.

== Legacy ==
From his youth, Małachowski laboured zealously for the good of his country, and as president of the royal court of justice won the honourable title of the "Polish Aristides". He was first elected a deputy to the Coronation Diet of 1764, and the great Four-Years Sejm unanimously elected him its speaker at the beginning of its session in 1788. Accurately gauging the situation, Małachowski speedily gathered round him all those who were striving to uphold the falling Commonwealth and warmly supported every promising project of reform. He was one of the framers of the constitution of 3 May 1791, exceeding in liberality all his colleagues and advocating the extension of the franchise to the towns and the emancipation of the serfs. He was the first to enter his name as a citizen of Warsaw in the civic register and to open negotiations with his own peasantry for their complete liberation. Disappointed in his hopes by the overthrow of the constitution, he resigned office and left the country in 1792, going first to Italy and subsequently to his estates in Galicia, where he was imprisoned for a time on a false suspicion of conspiracy.

In 1807, Małachowski was placed at the head of the executive committee appointed at Warsaw after its evacuation by the Prussians, and when the grand duchy of Warsaw was created, Małachowski became president of the senate under King Frederick Augustus I of Saxony. In the negotiations with the Austrian government concerning the Galician salt-mines, Małachowski came to the assistance of the depleted treasury by hypothesising all his estates as an additional guarantee. His death was regarded as a public calamity. In all the other towns of the grand duchy, funeral services were held simultaneously as a tribute to the respect and gratitude of the Polish nation.

== Remembrance ==
He is one of the figures immortalized in Jan Matejko's 1891 painting, Constitution of 3 May 1791. A monument in his honour has been proposed in the Polish city of Płock on the grounds of the school which bears his name.

== See also ==
- List of prime ministers of Poland
- Stanisław Kostka Potocki
- Małachowski
- Duchy of Warsaw
