= Jan Małachowski (Grand Chancellor of the Crown) =

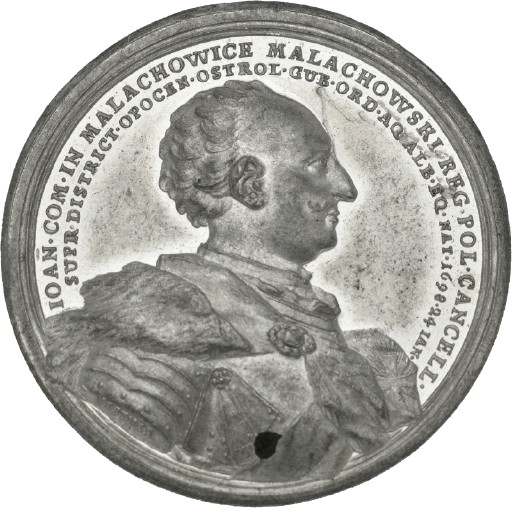
Portrait by Lorenz Christoph Mizler

Jan Małachowski (26 January 1698 – 25 June 1762), count of Końskie and Białaczów, was Grand Chancellor of the Crown of the Kingdom of Poland in the years 1746–1762, vice-chancellor of the Crown in the years 1735–1746, crown pantler in the years 1734–1735, governor of Kraków from 17 January 1734 to 30 June 1736, starost of Opoczno (in 1726–1752) and Ostrołęka (in 1739).

He was deputy from the Sieradz Voivodeship to the Sejm (the national legislature) of 1729. Deputy from the Sandomierz Voivodeship to the Sejm of 1732 and the extraordinary Sejm of 1733. As a deputy to the convocation Sejm of 1733 from the Sieradz Voivodeship, he was a member of the general confederation established on April 27, 1733 at that Sejm. Małachowski became the Grand Stolnik of the Crown in 1734, then the Grand Vice-Chancellor of the Crown in 1735. In 1735, he signed the resolution of the General Council of the Warsaw Confederation. On 10 July 1737, he signed a concordat with the Holy See in Wschowa.

On 11 August 1736, at a ceremony in Dresden, he was awarded the Order of the White Eagle (at the time, there was a personal union of the Electorate of Saxony and the Kingdom of Poland).

He was a fervent supporter of Augustus III, the King of Poland. He intensively sought Russian support. He was also starost of Grodecki and Krzeczów.

== Personal life ==
His father was Stanisław Małachowski (zm. 1699), the count of Count of Końskie and Białczewo. He married Izabela Humiecka. Among their nine children was Count Stanisław Małachowski II, the prime force behind the Constitution of 1791 for the Polish-Lithuanian Commonwealth; and Jacek Małachowski, another politician and administrator. Jan built a palace in Końskie. The palace and associated park complex remain to this day.
