= Kurowski =

Kurowski (Polish pronunciation: [kuˈrɔfski]; feminine: Kurowska; plural: Kurowscy) is a Polish surname. It comes from place names such as Kurowo and Kurów, which are derived from a Polish word for hen. Noble families bearing the name used various coats of arms, including Kur, Kurowski, Lubicz, Prawdzic, Strzemie, Ślepowron, Srzeniawa, and Topór. There are over 16,000 people with the surname in Poland.

Language	Masculine	Feminine
Polish	Kurowsky	Kurowska
Belarusian (Romanization)	Куроўскі (Kuroŭski)	Куроўская (Kuroŭskaja, Kurouskaya, Kurouskaia)
Lithuanian	Kurauskas	Kurauskienė (married); Kurauskaitė (unmarried)
Russian (Romanization)	Куровский (Kurovsky, Kurovskiy, Kurovskij)	Куровская (Kurovskaya, Kurovskaia, Kurovskaja)
Ukrainian (Romanization)	Куровський (Kurovskyi, Kurovskyy, Kurovskyj)	Куровська (Kurovska)

== People ==
- Bożena Kurowska (1937–1969), Polish actress
- Bruno Kurowski (1879–1944), German politician
- Eva Kurowski (born 1965), German jazz musician
- Franz Kurowski (1923–2011), German author
- Klemens Kurowski (1340–1405), Polish nobleman
- Krzysztof Kurowski (born 2006), Polish footballer
- Maciej Kurowski (born 1986), Polish luger
- Marian Kurowski, Polish football manager
- Mikołaj Kurowski (died 1411), Polish nobleman
- Sebastian Kurowski (born 1988), Polish footballer
- Whitey Kurowski (1918–1999), American baseball player

== See also ==
- Kurowie, a Polish knighthood family
