= Kursky =

Kur coat of arms used by some of Kurek family

Kurski (feminine: Kurska) is a Polish surname. It may be transliterated as Kursky or Kurskaya. Some of them use Kur, Ossorya, Prawdzic or Rogala coat of arms.

== People ==
Notable people with the surname include:

- Anna Kurska (1929–2016), Polish politician and lawyer
- Dmitry Kursky (1874–1932), Soviet Commissar for Justice (1918–1928)
- Jacek Kurski (born 1966), Polish politician and journalist
- Jarosław Kurski (born 1963), Polish journalist and columnist, deputy editor-in-chief of "Gazeta Wyborcza"
- Maciej Kurski (died 1681) – Polish Catholic priest, Bernardine, Bishop of Bacău, Archdeacon of Pszczew

== Places ==
- Kursky District, Kursk Oblast
- Kursky District, Stavropol Krai
- Kursky Rail Terminal, a rail terminal in Moscow, Russia
- Kurskaya (Koltsevaya line), a station of Koltsevaya line of the Moscow Metro
- Kurskaya (Arbatsko-Pokrovskaya line), a station of the Arbatsko-Pokrovskaya line of the Moscow Metro
- Kurskaya oblast or Kursk Oblast, a federal subject of Russia
- Kursky (rural locality), a list of rural localities in Russia
- Kursky, Republic of Adygea

== See also ==
- Kursk (disambiguation)
- Kurowski
- Kurkov
- Kurek
