= Kursky (rural locality) =

Kursky (Russian: Ку́рский; masculine), Kurskaya (Ку́рская; feminine), or Kurskoye (Ку́рское; neuter) is the name of several rural localities in Russia:

- Kursky, Republic of Adygea, a khutor in Giaginsky District of the Republic of Adygea
- Kursky, Novosibirsk Oblast, a settlement in Bagansky District of Novosibirsk Oblast
- Kursky, Orenburg Oblast, a settlement in Marksovsky Selsoviet of Alexandrovsky District of Orenburg Oblast
- Kurskoye, Belgorod Oblast, a selo in Starooskolsky District of Belgorod Oblast
- Kurskoye, Kaliningrad Oblast, a settlement in Gvardeysky Rural Okrug of Bagrationovsky District of Kaliningrad Oblast
- Kurskoye, Krasnoyarsk Krai, a selo in Kursky Selsoviet of Kuraginsky District of Krasnoyarsk Krai
- Kurskoye, Primorsky Krai, a selo under the administrative jurisdiction of Lesozavodsk City Under Krai Jurisdiction, Primorsky Krai
- Kurskoye, Tver Oblast, a village in Vyshnevolotsky District of Tver Oblast
- Kurskaya, Kurgan Oblast, a village in Shchigrovsky Selsoviet of Mokrousovsky District of Kurgan Oblast
- Kurskaya, Stavropol Krai, a stanitsa in Kursky Selsoviet of Kursky District of Stavropol Krai
