= Kurkova =

Kurkova may refer to:

- Kurkova, feminine form of the East Slavic surname Kurkov
- Kurková, feminine form of the Czech surname Kurka
- Kůrková, feminine form of the Czech surname Kůrka

== See also ==
- Kurkowa, Polish archaic/colloquial feminine surname
