= Anna Kurek =

Anna Kurek may refer to:

- Anna Kurek (volleyball) (born 1993), Polish volleyball player
- Anna Kurek (resistance member) (1929–2026), Polish nurse and member of the Polish resistance
