= Kurkov =

Kurkov (Russian: Курков) is a Slavic masculine surname. Its feminine counterpart is Kurkova. Notable people with the surname include:

- Andrey Kurkov (born 1961), Ukrainian novelist
- Bella Kurkova (1935–2023), Russian presenter, journalist and producer
- Ravshana Kurkova (born 1980), Uzbek and Russian actor

== See also ==
- Kurkovo, rural locality (a village) in Selivanovsky District, Vladimir Oblast, Russia
- Kurek/ Kurkowa
- Kurowski
- Kurski
