= Tom Liwa =

German singer-songwriter (born 1961)

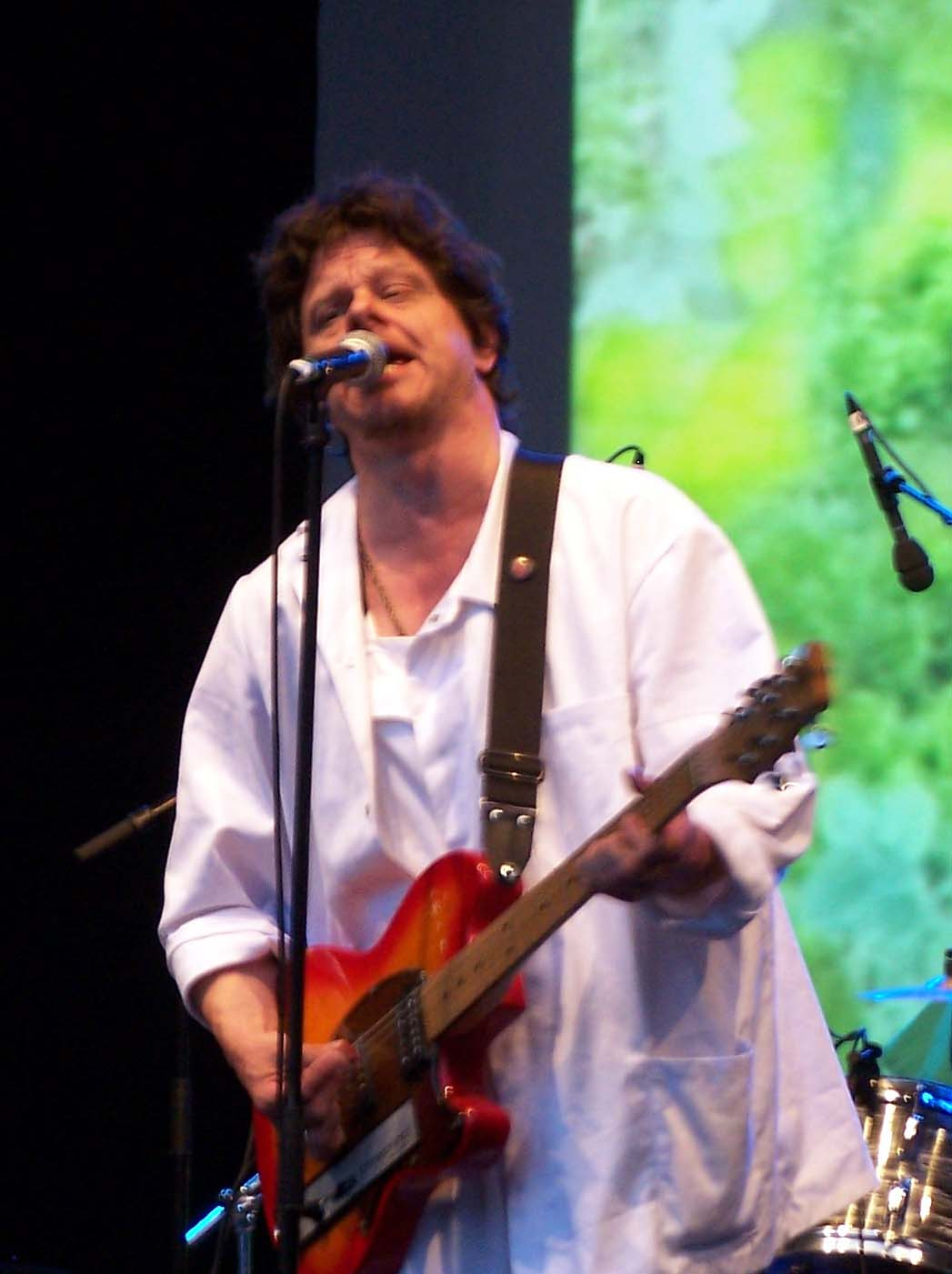
- Performing at Zeche Zollverein in 2007.

Background information
- Born: Thomas Greiner; 25 October 1961 (age 65); Duisburg, Germany
- Genre: rock
- Occupations: Singer-songwriter
- Instruments: Vocals, guitar
- Years active: 1985–present
- Labels: Glitterhouse, Ludwig (Indigo), Normal (Indigo), Scratch'N' (Indigo), Moll (EFA), V2 (Universal), Rough Trade
- Website: Tom Liwa's website Flowerpornoes website

Tom Liwa (born Thomas Greiner, 25 October 1961) is a German singer-songwriter who has been performing as a solo artist in addition to being a founding member and frontman of the band Flowerpornoes. While his artistic solo output long went unnoticed by German mainstream news sources and radio stations, he was recognised early on for his work with the band. In recent years, he has been receiving increased attention due both to a steady fan-base and various collaborations and contributions, e.g. to Klee's 2006 album Zwischen Himmel und Erde. Liwa has cited Joni Mitchell's Hejira as one of his favourite albums and as a major musical influence, and has named Neil Young as an early idol.

== Biography ==
In 1986, Tom Liwa was a founding member and became frontman of the band, Flowerpornoes, in his native Duisburg.

The four albums released during this period mainly featured English lyrics. Liwa has stated that he had in fact already begun writing German lyrics but that at the time German songtexts were considered "unhip". Although his English texts had received praise in music magazines, the later decision to begin recording songs in German rather than English was made in a conscious effort to address what Liwa perceived as a failure to communicate the deeper meanings in his lyrics to an audience beyond music critics.

After unfruitful attempts to score any major popular success and with mounting tensions between the band members and differing artistic visions, the Flowerpornoes disbanded shortly after the release of the 1990 album, As Trivial As Life And Death. Subsequent bids for a contract from a major record label failed, to Liwa's retrospective relief.

After the breakup, Tom Liwa toured with Blumfeld on their first tour. Other than that, he played only very minor gigs during the time. In his own retrospect account, he states that he considered his career finished at that point.

The Flowerpornoes project was revived in 1993, culminating in the release of Mamas Pfirsiche (Für schlechte Zeiten). Two more albums followed, 1994's Red' nicht von Straßen, nicht von Zügen and Ich & Ich in 1996, before the band members parted ways again.

From 1995 to 1997, Liwa also contributed to the eponymous first album by the Tim Isfort Orchester project alongside Blixa Bargeld, Eva Kurowski, Katharina Thalbach and others.

After the second breakup of the Flowerpornoes, Tom Liwa began work on his first solo album. Due to participation in a number of other projects, it took four years to complete and publish St. Amour in 2000. The earlier Voeding, released in 1998, was a collection of songs released as mailorder only. The final track of St. Amour is a non-musical piece called "Wir haben die Musik" ("we have the music"), spoken by Christian Brückner, whose voice is well known throughout Germany as the dubbing voice for Robert De Niro and other actors. Also during the time, Liwa featured on Kevin Coyne's Knocking On Your Brain, published in 1997.

More solo albums followed since then, 2004's Dudajim being the latest of those that have not been published as mailorder only.

On 25 July 2005, the Flowerpornoes performed together for the first time since the 1996 breakup. The occasion was a concert in Cologne, organised as part of the campaign "nrw retten, taz abonnieren" ("save NRW, subscribe to taz") by newspaper die tageszeitung's North Rhine-Westphalia edition, which at the time was struggling financially.

In 2007, after a hiatus of more than ten years, a new Flowerpornoes album was released, Wie oft musst du vor die Wand laufen bis der Himmel sich auftut? The album has received considerably greater mainstream attention than any prior work of Tom Liwa.

One of the songs on the album is called "Österreich", an allusion to the band's website being located within the Austrian top-level domain .at because the German top-level domain URL (flowerpornoes.de) is registered by someone not related to the band in any form.

== Personal life ==
Tom Liwa is married to former fellow Flowerpornoes member Alexandra Gilles Videla, the couple has three children.

== Discography ==
Year	Album name	Project	Label
1987	Make Up	Flowerpornoes	Scratch'N'
1988	Stardust Kiddies	Flowerpornoes	Scratch'N'
1989	Pumpkin Tide	Flowerpornoes	Scratch'N'
1990	As Trivial As Life And Death	Flowerpornoes	Scratch'N'
1993	Mamas Pfirsiche (Für schlechte Zeiten)	Flowerpornoes	Moll
1994	Red' nicht von Straßen, nicht von Zügen	Flowerpornoes	Moll
1996	Ich & Ich	Flowerpornoes	Moll
1998	Voeding	solo	Glitterhouse
2000	St. Amour	solo	Moll
2001	Evolution Blues	solo	Normal
2001	Staefa CH	solo	Glitterhouse
2002	Lopnor	with Florian Glässing	Normal
2002	Two Originals of Tom Liwa (double album with Ich reite ein Pferd auf dem sonst nur Frauen reiten und Nostalgia No Existe)	solo	Normal
2004	Dudajim	solo	Normal
2005	Glauberg/California	solo	Glitterhouse
2005	Ich Könnte Mir Ein Fahrrad Leihen	with Werner Muth	Ludwig
2007	Wie oft musst du vor die Wand laufen bis der Himmel sich auftut?	Flowerpornoes	V2/Rough Trade
2012	Ich Liebe Menschen Wie Ihr	Flowerpornoes	Gim Records/Soulfood

Other featured contributions

- He featured as an extra, portraying a musician in the 1999 film Pola X.
- The song Julianastraat from the 2000 album, St. Amour, is featured on the soundtrack for the film The Edukators.
- Among other prominent German-language authors, Tom Liwa contributed to an anthology called texttourimus (the title being a pun on sex tourism). The entire revenue generated by the volume, published in November 2005 in collaboration with UNICEF, was donated to a charitable organisation.
