= Kurowie =

Polish noble family

Kur coat of arms

Kurowie was a Polish noble family from Mazovia in medieval Poland.

== History ==
The family was first mentioned on 2 May 1239 in Tabulatorium Actorum Antiquorum Varsoviense Maximum. Bolesław I of Masovia confirmed the purchase of the village Doiasdovo by Cur and Jozeph for 7 Grzywna. Their family seat Kurów was probably first mentioned between 1112 and 1118 in the Gesta principum Polonorum of Gallus Anonymus as castrum Galli, which is interpreted as Gall's Castle.

== Coat of arms ==
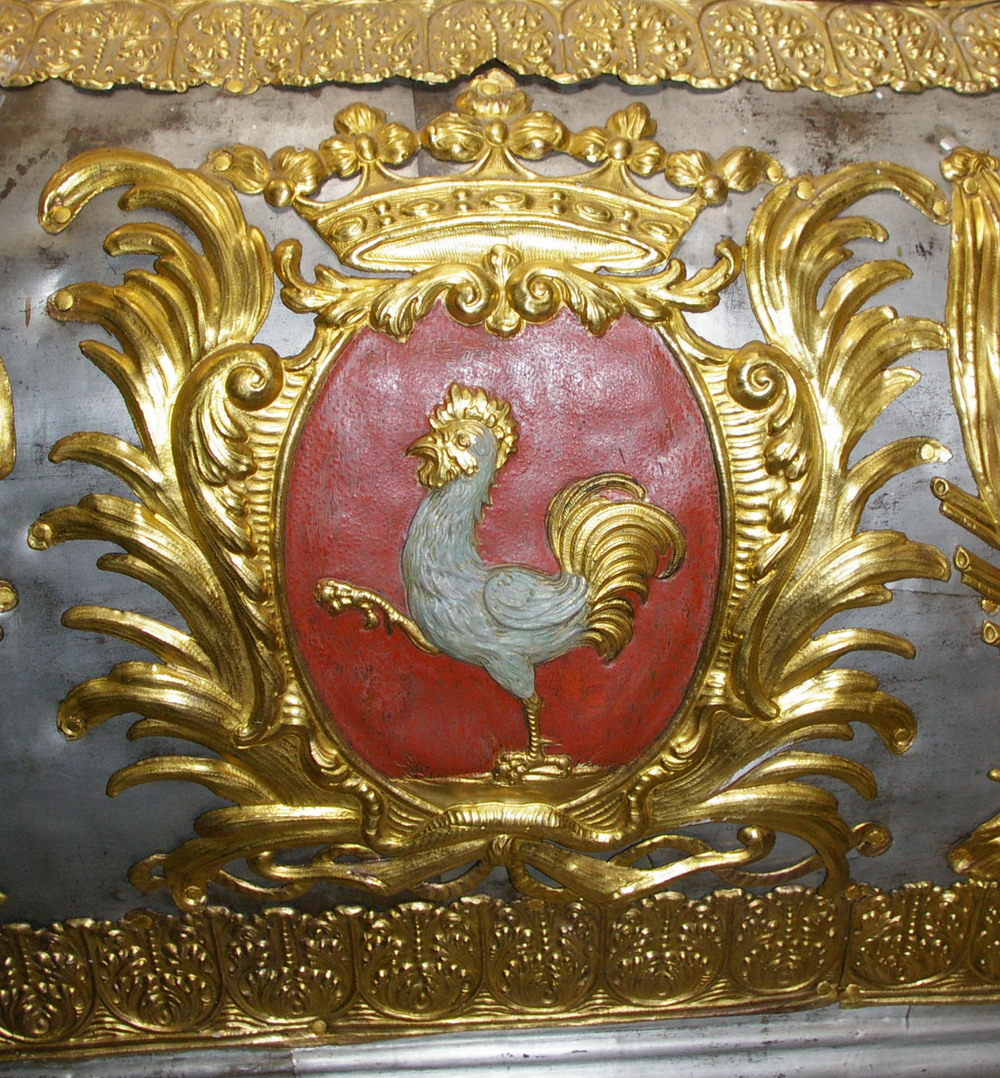

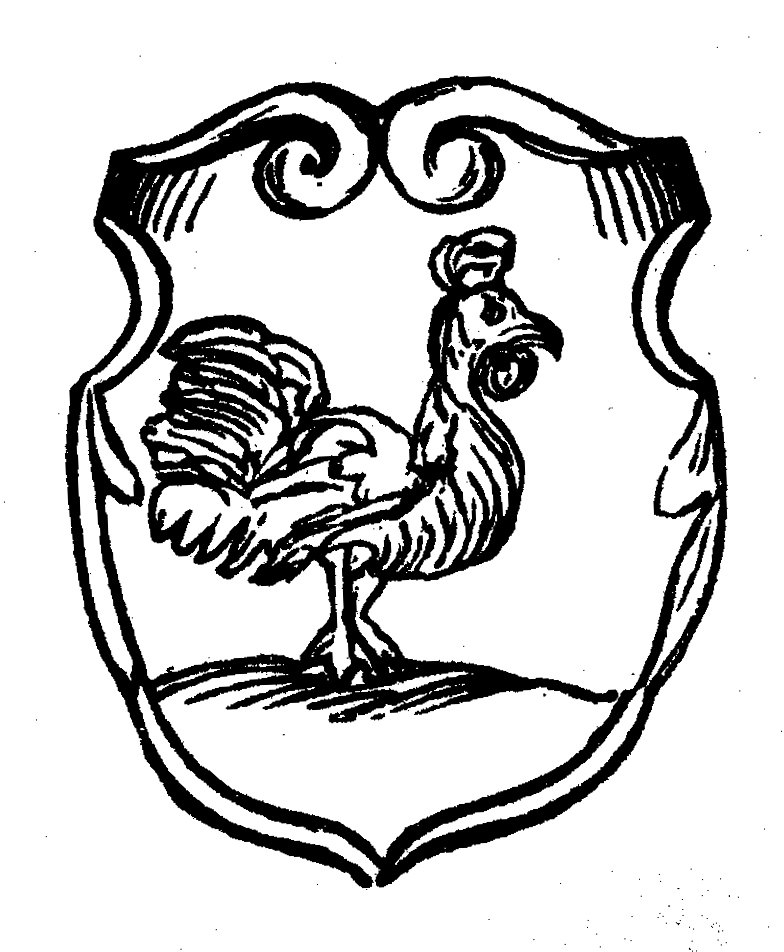
Kur coat of arms - illustration from "Herby Rycerstwa Polskiego" Bartosz Paprocki, 1584

== Notable members ==
- Mikołaj Kiczka – archdeacon of Gniezno
- Klemens z Kurowa, knight, castellan of Żarnów - allied with the knight Jan Kmita, starost of Kraków.
- Piotr Kurowski ze Szreniawy i Kurowa, knight, starost of Lublin
- Mikołaj Kurowski – Archbishop of Gniezno
- Stanisław Kur – Catholic priest, Protonotary apostolic

== Gallery ==
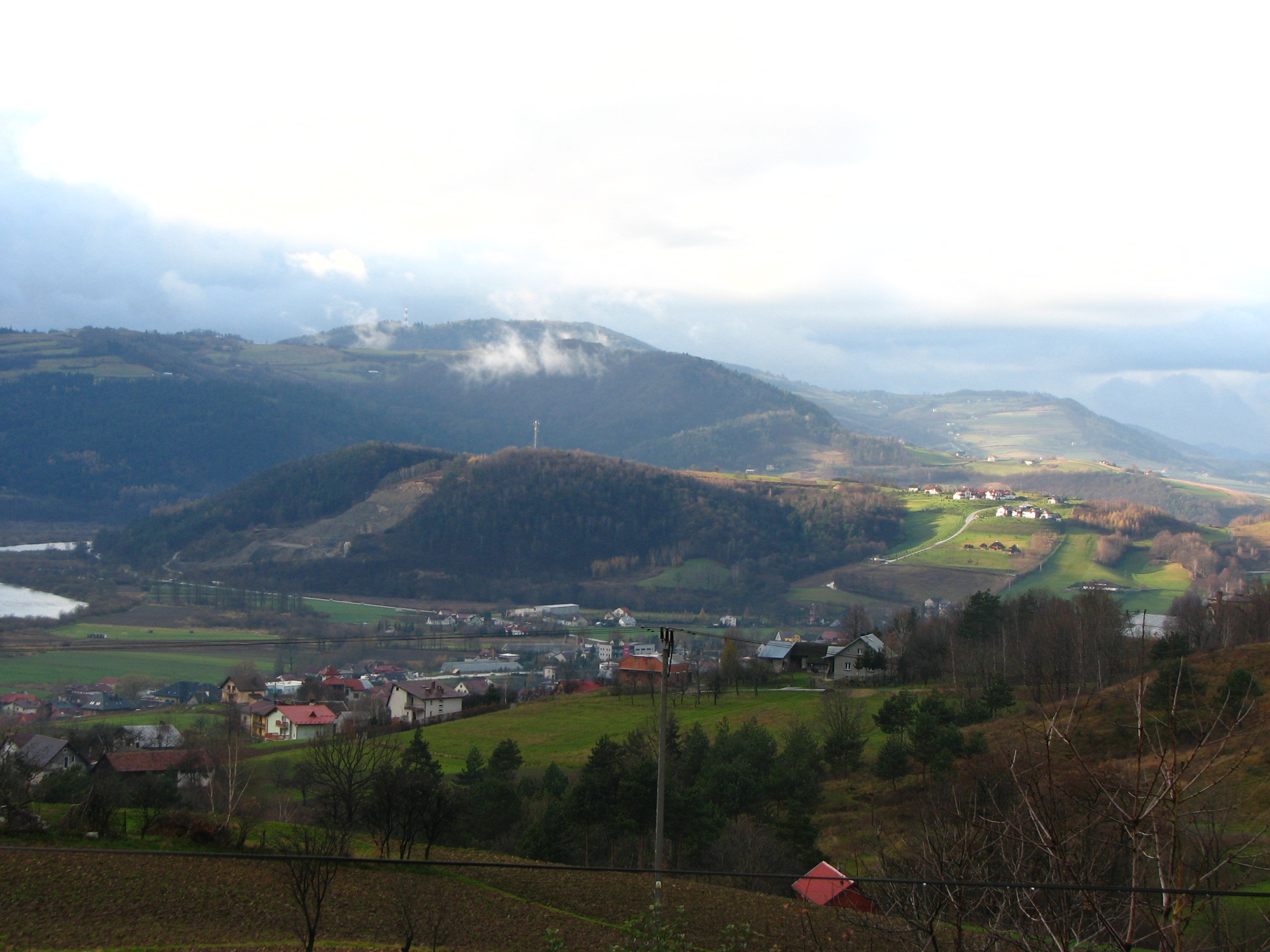
Kurowska Góra, formerly a castle of the Kurowie family was standing there.

== See also ==
- Kurów
- von Hahn

== Bibliography ==
- Franciszek Piekosiński: Rycerstwo polskie wieków średnich. Kraków: 1896-1991.
- Edward Breza: Nazwiska Pomorzan: pochodzenie i zmiany, Tom 1. Gdańsk: Wydawn. Uniwersytetu Gdańskiego, 2000, s. 489. ISBN 8370178987.
- Jan Stanisław Bystroń: Nazwiska Polskie. Lwów: Książnica, 1936. ISBN 8305126366.
- Jan Korwin Kochanowski: Zbiór ogólny przywilejów i spominków Mazowieckich. Warszawa: Drukiem W. Lazarskiego Towarzystwo Naukowe, 1919, s. Tom 2, Wydania 259-478.
