= Jan Kropidło =

His Excellency Jan Kropidło
- Archbishop of Gniezno
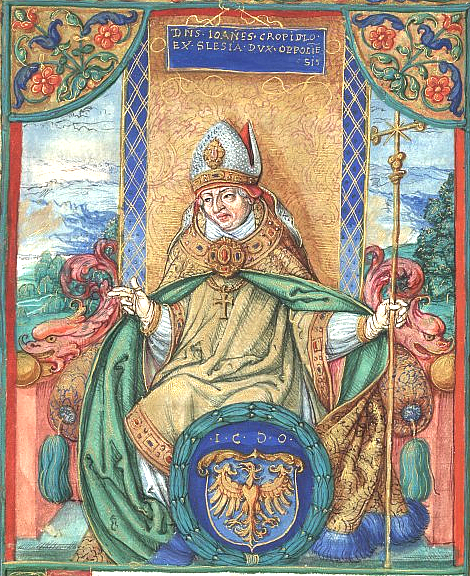
- Church: Roman Catholic
- Archdiocese: Gniezno
- Installed: 1389
- Term ended: 1394
- Predecessor: Bodzanta
- Successor: Dobrogost of Nowy Dwór

Personal details
- Born: 1360
- Died: 3 March 1421 (aged 60–61)
- Coat of arms

Jan Kropidło (1360 or 1364 – 3 March 1421), was an ecclesiastic leader in Poland during the late Middle Ages.

Jan was the eldest son of Duke Bolko III of Strzelce and his wife Anna. Jan was titled Duke of Strzelce (1382–96, with his brothers) and Duke of Opole (from 1396, with his brothers but only formally). His vocation, however, was the Roman Catholic Church, and Jan was appointed as Bishop of Poznań (1382–84), Bishop of Włocławek (1384–89), nominated Archbishop of Gniezno (1389–94), Bishop of Kamień (1394–98), Bishop of Chełmno (Culm) (1398–1402), and again Bishop of Włocławek from 1402 until his death.

== Life ==
Jan was the first child and eldest son of Duke Bolko III of Strzelce by his wife Anna, who was probably daughter of Duke Jan I of Oświęcim. The couple had four sons and one daughter. Although Jan was the eldest of the four male siblings, for unknown reasons he was destined for the Church from his early years. His uncle, Duke Vladislaus II of Opole, became guardian to the minor brothers when their father died in 1382 and the four brothers all inherited the Duchy of Strzelce as co-rulers.

In 1379 Jan, while yet a teenager, was named a provost of the Spiš Chapterhouse (in northern Hungary, then pawned to Poland), giving him substantial revenues. His rapid ecclesiastic ascent was largely due to the support of his powerful uncle Vladislaus. Despite his new duties, Jan would also study law and theology in Prague and Bologna.

In 1382 Jan returned to Poland, where he, thanks to the support of King Louis I, was appointed Bishop of Poznań. Jan remained in this office for only two years, because in 1384 he received the more profitable Bishopric of Włocławek.

In 1388, the death of Archbishop Bodzanta gave Jan the opportunity to obtain a more politically and important position; the Archbishopric of Gniezno. Despite the Papal consent, however, Jan never completely took the title and goods of the Archbishopric. The decisive objection was made by the new Polish King, Władysław II Jagiełło, who was involved in a bitter dispute with Jan's uncle Vladislaus and would not accept the nomination of his enemy's nephew to the most important position in the Church of Poland – because that could place the king in a risky position. The fact that Jan originally had not wanted to combine forces with his uncle did not matter to the king. The dispute over the Archbishopric lasted until 1394, when Jan, unable to obtain the king's recognition, finally resigned. This period of struggle was probably the heaviest in Jan's life, and severely affected his finances.

Soon after, Jan obtained the position as Bishop of Kamień. The revenues of the Diocese were little, and therefore he asked the Pope for the right to reap revenues from the Bishopric of Poznań. Again, the opposition of King Władysław II prevented him from obtaining the rich benefices. In 1398 Jan was named Bishop of Chełmno (Culm), whose territory in medieval Prussia lay entirely within the Teutonic Order. In 1399 Jan returned to Poland, but in Kalisz he was stopped by partisans of King Władysław II, who forced him to take the oath of loyalty.

Władysław Opolczyk died in 1401, an event that enabled a complete reconciliation between Jan and the Polish king. His death also conveyed the title of Duke of Opole upon Jan, in co-ruling with his surviving two brothers, although the title was a figurehead only and rule was controlled by his brother Bolko IV of Opole.

Now, Jan's ambitions focused on recovering the Bishopric of Włocławek, and he was named a bishop one year later in 1402. He remained in this post until his death. The Włocławek hierarchy was not easy, mainly because the Diocese was positioned in the middle of disputes between the Teutonic Order and the Kingdom of Poland, especially over who was the real owner of the Diocese of Gdańsk Pomerania (in fact, the Diocese was part of the Bishopric of Włocławek). This conflict made ruling almost impossible for Jan. As a result, he became increasingly willing to cooperate with Poland; this was particularly revealed in 1410 during the Polish–Lithuanian–Teutonic War, when thanks to the mediation of Bishop of Gdańsk, he paid homage to the Polish king.

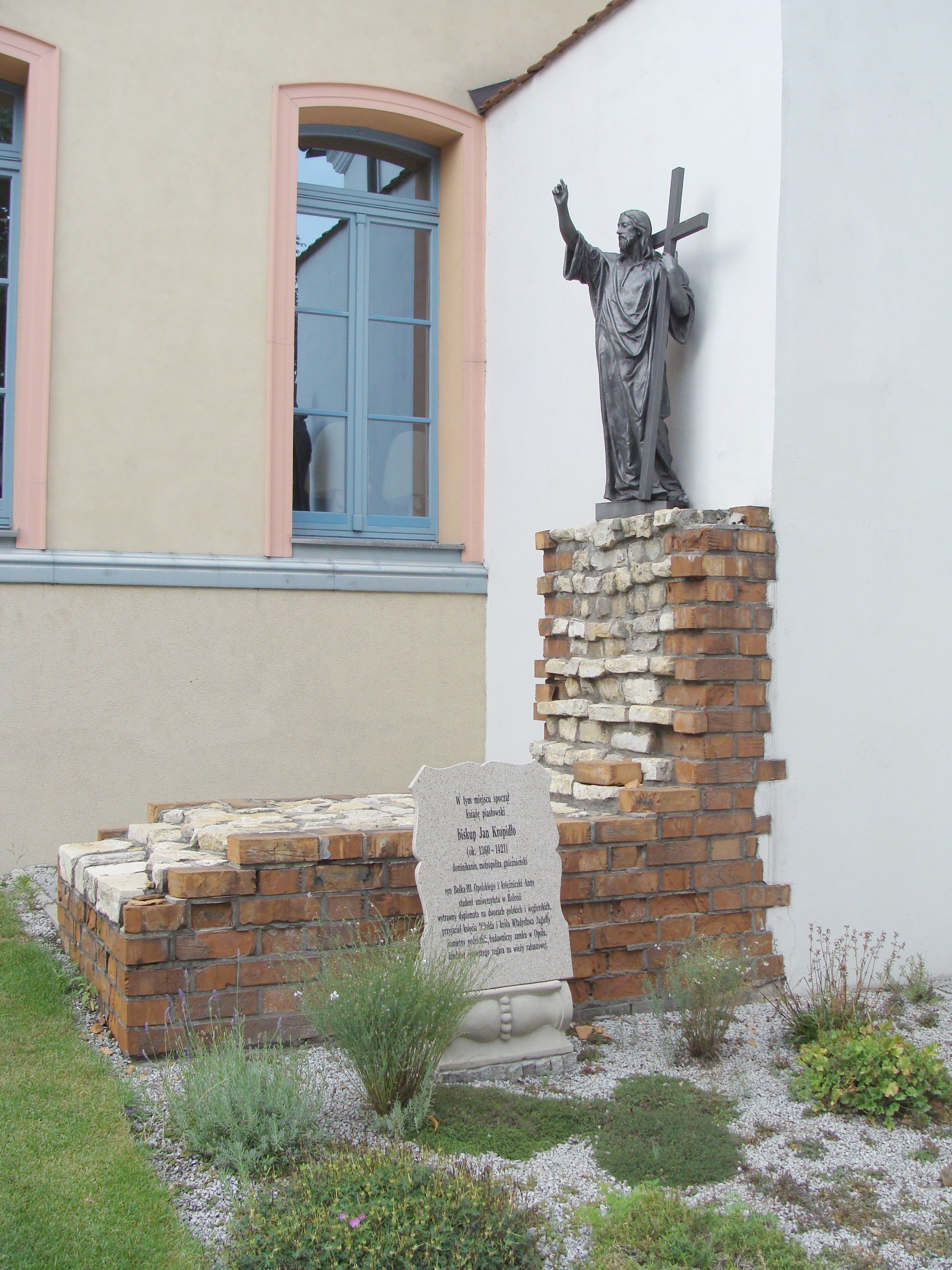
Tomb of Jan Kropidło in Opole

Jan's decision to remain on the Polish side had serious consequences for him: in 1411 he was imprisoned by the citizens of Wrocław, who were subjects of the Bohemian Kingdom and in this way could neutralize the bishop's activities. Jan regained his freedom after three months through the personal intervention of Sigismund of Luxembourg, King of Hungary and Holy Roman Emperor. The city of Wrocław was forced into a humiliating apology ceremony. In general, the relationship between Jan and the House of Luxembourg was good, and thanks to this, the Bishop obtained the Abbeys of Szekszárd and Pannonhalma (both in Hungary) as new revenues. He was one of the signatories of the Union of Horodło on 2 October 1413.

During 1415-1417 Jan took part in the Council of Constance, which ended the so-called "Three-Popes Controversy" and therefore the Western Schism of the Roman Catholic Church. Importantly for Jan personally, during the council the Teutonic Order guaranteed the inviolability of the Bishopric of Gdańsk Pomerania, thanks to the influence of the Curia and the support of the Polish delegation. He also had the satisfaction of seeing the Bishop of Wrocław punished for Jan's unlawful imprisonment a few years earlier.

As Bishop of Włocławek, Jan was an excellent ruler and the revenues of the Bishopric increased significantly. He also raised the category of his Diocese, after ordering construction of a magnificent cathedral.

Throughout his life, and despite his Church career, Jan always used his lay title, firstly Jan, Duke of Strzelce, and later Jan, Duke of Opole. He was subsequently, however, as Jan Kropidło, although there is uncertainty about the source of the sobriquet. In one derivation, "Kropidło" means "aspergillum" – an instrument used to sprinkle holy water – in allusion to his Church career. Alternately, Jan might have received the nickname from his thick hair.

Jan died on 3 March 1421 in Opole and was buried in the local Dominican church. In his will, he left a considerable amount of money to the city of Opole.

== Notes ==
Regnal titles
Preceded by Bolko III	Duke of Strzelce with Bolko IV, Henry II (until 1394) and Bernard; 1382–1396	Succeeded by Bolko IV and Bernard
Preceded by Władysław Opolczyk	Duke of Opole with Bolko IV and Bernard (until 1400); 1396–1421	Succeeded by Bolko IV
Catholic Church titles
Preceded by Mikołaj z Górki	Bishop of Poznań; 1382–1384	Succeeded by Dobrogost z Nowego Dworu
Preceded by Zbylut z Wąsoczy	Bishop of Włocławek; 1384–1389	Succeeded by Henry VIII of Legnica
Preceded by Bodzanta	Archbishop of Gniezno; 1389–1394 (only formally)	Succeeded by Dobrogost z Nowego Dworu
Regnal titles
Catholic Church titles
Preceded by Jan Brunosis	Prince-Bishop of Cammin (Kamień) as John III rivalled by Bogislaw of Pomerania; 1394–1398	Succeeded by Nicolaus Bock von Schippenbeil (OT)
Catholic Church titles
Preceded by Nicolaus Bock von Schippenbeil	Bishop of Chełmno (Culm); 1398–1402	Succeeded by Arnold Stapel
Preceded by Mikołaj Kurowski	Bishop of Włocławek; 1402–1421	Succeeded by Jan Pella
