= Kurowo =

Kurowo may refer to the following places:

- Kurowo, Gmina Grodzisk Wielkopolski in Greater Poland Voivodeship (west-central Poland)
- Kurowo, Przasnysz County in Masovian Voivodeship (east-central Poland)
- Kurowo, Sierpc County in Masovian Voivodeship (east-central Poland)
- Kurowo, Kościan County in Greater Poland Voivodeship (west-central Poland)
- Kurowo, Podlaskie Voivodeship (north-east Poland)
- Kurowo, Pomeranian Voivodeship (north Poland)
  - Kurowo railway station, a disused station in Kurowo, Pomeranian Voivodeship
- Kurowo, West Pomeranian Voivodeship (north-west Poland)
