= Kursk (disambiguation) =

Kursk is a city in Russia.

Kursk may also refer to:

- Kursk Oblast, a federal subject of Russia
- Kursk crater, a meteorite impact crater in Russia
- Kursk Magnetic Anomaly
- Battle of Kursk, the 1943 World War II battle that was Germany's last major offensive in the east and one of the largest tank battles in history
  - Battle of Kursk order of battle
- Kursk offensive (2024–present), Ukrainian incursion into Kursk Oblast
  - Ukrainian occupation of Kursk Oblast, subsequent occupation
- 3073 Kursk, a minor asteroid
- Kursk (board game), a 1980 board wargame that simulates the battle
- Our Lady of Kursk, an Eastern Orthodox icon
- KYPCK, a Finnish metal band
- Russian submarine Kursk
  - Kursk submarine disaster (2000)
    - Kursk (play), a play inspired by the sinking of Kursk
    - Kursk (film), a film by Thomas Vinterberg, inspired by the sinking of Kursk
- Kursk (inhabited locality), several inhabited localities in Russia

== See also ==
- Kursky (disambiguation)
