= Kurek =

Kur coat of arms used by some of Kurek family

Kurek is a Polish surname. Archaic feminine forms are Kurkowa (by husband), Kurkówna (by father); they still can be used colloquially. Some of them use Kur, Nieczuja or Sulima coat of arms. Notable people with the surname include:

- Adrian Kurek (born 1988), Polish professional road bicycle race
- Anna Kurek (volleyball) (born 1993), Polish volleyball player
- Bartosz Kurek (born 1988), Polish volleyball player
- Damien Kurek (born 1989), Canadian politician
- Ewa Kurek (born 1951), Polish historian
- Harvey Kurek Ovshinsky (born 1948), American writer and media producer
- Jalu Kurek (1904–1983), Polish poet and prose writer
- Józef Kurek (1933–2015), Polish ice hockey player
- Karol Kurek (1895–1940), lieutenant colonel of the Polish Army infantry, Knight of the Order of Virtuti Militari, victim of the Katyn massacre
- Michał Kurek (born 1944), Polish engineer and politician, member of the Sejm
- Ralph Kurek (born 1943), American football player
- Zofia Kurek (born 1951), Polish politician, member of the Sejm

== See also ==
- Kurkiewicz
- Kurowski
- Kurkov
- Kurski
- Kłonowiec-Kurek, a village in the administrative district of Gmina Skaryszew
- Kurek Svita Formation, a Mesozoic geologic formation
- Kuzeh Kanan
