= Bodzanta =

Polish noble

His Excellency Bodzanta
- Archbishop of Gniezno
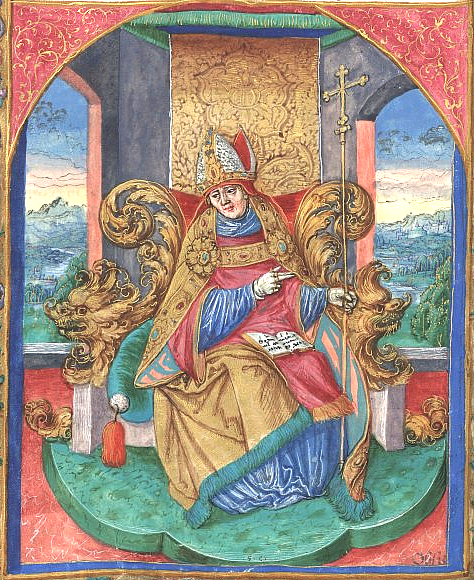
- Church: Roman Catholic
- Archdiocese: Gniezno
- Installed: 1382
- Term ended: 1388
- Predecessor: Janusz Suchywilk
- Successor: Jan Kropidło

Personal details
- Born: 1320 Szeligi
- Died: 1388 (aged 67–68) Chełmno
- Coat of arms

Bodzanta or Bodzęta of Szeliga coat of arms (Polish: Bodzęta; 1320–1388), was a Polish nobleman, governor of Kraków–Sandomierz lands (1350, 1357–1370, 1372–1379, 1381) and the archbishop of Gniezno (1382–1388).

Supporter of Louis I of Hungary and the Angevin dynasty. After his death, he first supported an Angevin candidate for the throne of the Kingdom of Poland, and than, Siemowit IV, Duke of Masovia. On 16 June 1383, he proclaimed Siemowit the king of Poland, but due to lack of support for Siemowit, he withdrew his support, embracing the idea of a Polish–Lithuanian union. On 15 February, Bodzanta baptised Lithuanian Grand Duke Jogaila, who became the king Władysław II Jagiełło. On 18 February, he presided over his marriage with Jadwiga of Poland, and on 4 March he crowned him the king of Poland.
