= Mikołaj Kiczka =

Polish noble

Kur coat of arms

Mikołaj Kiczka (died 1429) was a Polish noble, diplomat and priest.

In 1421–1422 together with Władysław Oporowski and Mikołaj Trąba he represented Poland and the Polish king Władysław Jagiełło in the process between Poland and the Teutonic Order before the Holy See in Rome. In 1427 he took part in the border delineation between Poland and the Order.

Archdeacon of Gniezno. Vicar of Poznań (1423–1428).

He used the Kur coat of arms.
