= Kursk (inhabited locality) =

Kursk (Russian: Курск) is the name of several inhabited localities in Russia.

Urban localities

- Kursk, a city in Kursk Oblast

Rural localities

- Kursk, Altai Krai, a selo in Kursky Selsoviet of Kulundinsky District in Altai Krai; 52°27′N 78°55′E
- Kursk (settlement), Leningrad Oblast, a settlement in Kurskoye Settlement Municipal Formation of Volosovsky District in Leningrad Oblast; 59°19′N 29°8′E
- Kursk (village), Leningrad Oblast, a village in Kurskoye Settlement Municipal Formation of Volosovsky District in Leningrad Oblast; 59°18′N 29°8′E
