= Ossorya coat of arms =

Polish coat of arms

Ossorya
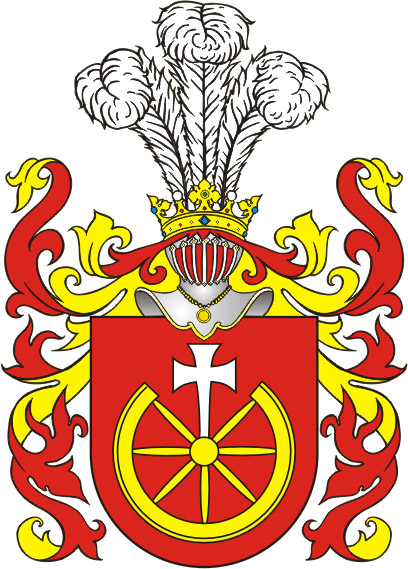
- Battle cry: Hosoryja, Osoryja, Szarza
- Alternative names: Ossorija, Osorya, Poświt, Szarza, Sztarza
- Earliest mention: 14th century
- Towns: none
- Families: 60 names altogether: Billicki, Bochłowski, Bogdal, Boklewski, Boklowski, Bokłowski, Brochocki, Bukowski, Burzyński, Busz, Buszkowski, Ciepecki, Ciepicki, Ciepliński, Czeszyk, Dobiecki, Filipowski, Gordyk, Gordyka, Grabownicki, Hruszewicz, Kołomyjski, Konarski, Kondracki, Kondradzki, Konradzki, Korabiewski, Korabski, Kostecki, Kostrzecki, Krzesławski, Krzywoszewski, Kunradzki, Kurski, Kwasowski, Lasowski, Łaszewski, Martos, Metalski, Niepoczołowski, Niepoczołtowski, Pelwelski, Pierzczewski, Pieskowski, Ryterowski, Schleewitz, Sczaniecki, Stadnicki, Striżewski, Szczaniecki, Świeczka, Terawski, Twardzicki, Twerbus, Twierbut, Twirbut, Tworkowski, Tyrawski, Werbotych, Złotski

Ossorya is a Polish coat of arms. It was used by several szlachta families in the times of the Polish–Lithuanian Commonwealth.

== Notable bearers ==
Notable bearers of this coat of arms have included:

- Andrzej of Ochocice of Ossorya — Polish knight.
- Borys Martos (1879 – 1977) — Ukrainian politician, pedagogue, economist.

== See also ==
- Polish heraldry
- Heraldry
- Coat of arms
