= Andrzej Łaskarz =

Polish bishop and diplomat

- Bishop of Poznań
- Church: Roman Catholic
- Diocese: Diocese of Poznań
- In office: 1414–1426
- Predecessor: Piotr Wysz Radoliński
- Successor: Stanisław Ciołek

Personal details
- Born: 1362
- Died: 1426 (aged 63–64) Gosławice
- Buried: Poznań Cathedral
- Occupation: bishop, diplomat, reformer
- Coat of arms

Andrzej Łaskarz (Laskary) from Gosławic of the Godziemba coat of arms (1362–1426) was Bishop of Poznań from 1414 to 1426, diplomat, doctor of rights, participant of the Councils, and reformer.

== Biography ==
His father was Łaszcz z Gosławic from Gosławice, the Konin castellan - performing the function of a subordinate lądzko-Koniń, and his mother Dorota (probably related to the Poznań bishop Piotr Wysz).

He began his education in Brodnica, then in 1379 he studied at the Charles University in Prague, where before 1392 he obtained the title of a bachelor in the field of decrees, however he graduated in 1393. He then went to the University of Padua, where he obtained the same field in 1405. PhD title.

Already in 1392 he became a provost of Włocławek and held this office until 1414. Also in 1392 he began his diplomatic career as a Polish envoy to the Grand Master of the Teutonic Order Konrad von Wallenrode. In 1397 he became the chancellor of Queen Jadwiga of Poland, and a year later (in 1398) the Włocławek Chapter wanted to him to appointed as a bishop, but Andrzej himself abandoned the title in favor of Mikołaj Kurowski, who was supported by the Polish King. Before 1402, Łaskarz became a canon of Płock, and in 1405 he was the chaplain of the German King Ruprecht Wittelsbach. In 1409 he became a papal collector in Poland and also took part, together with his relatives, the Poznań bishop Piotr Wysz Radoliński, in the Council of Pisa and pilgrimage to the Holy Land. In 1411, together with Jakub Śledz, he visited Antipope John XXIII, complaining to him about the Teutonic Knights breaking the First Peace of Toruń.

His spiritual career was also developing. Already in 1413 he was the dean of the Wawel Cathedral in Kraków, the canon of Gniezno and Poznań. A year later (in 1414) he became a papal protector and bishop of Poznań.

In the meantime, from 1412 to 1414 on behalf of Władysław II Jagiełło he appeared as a prosecutor in the trial between Poland and the Teutonic Order and then went as a member of the official Polish delegation to the Council of Constance, where he mainly participated in the work of the commission for faith and in the trials between Poland and the Teutonic Knights. He also became known there as a supporter of church reform and conciliarist. In 1419 he was in the procession of the king during his congress with the emperor in Nowy Sącz, and in 1420 he was in the legation to the Imperial Diet, which took place in Wrocław, during which the emperor considered Polish-Teutonic disputes. In the same year he took part in a synod called by Mikołaj Trąb to Wieluń. In 1422, he again took part in the trial with the Teutonic Knights, appearing as a witness this time, and in 1423 he took part in the Council in Pavia. In 1424, together with Paweł Włodkowic, he was sent to Rome, where they repudiated Teutonic charges against Poles in front of the Pope. During this stay, he also resigned from the episcopal throne, which, however, was not accepted.

== Foundations ==
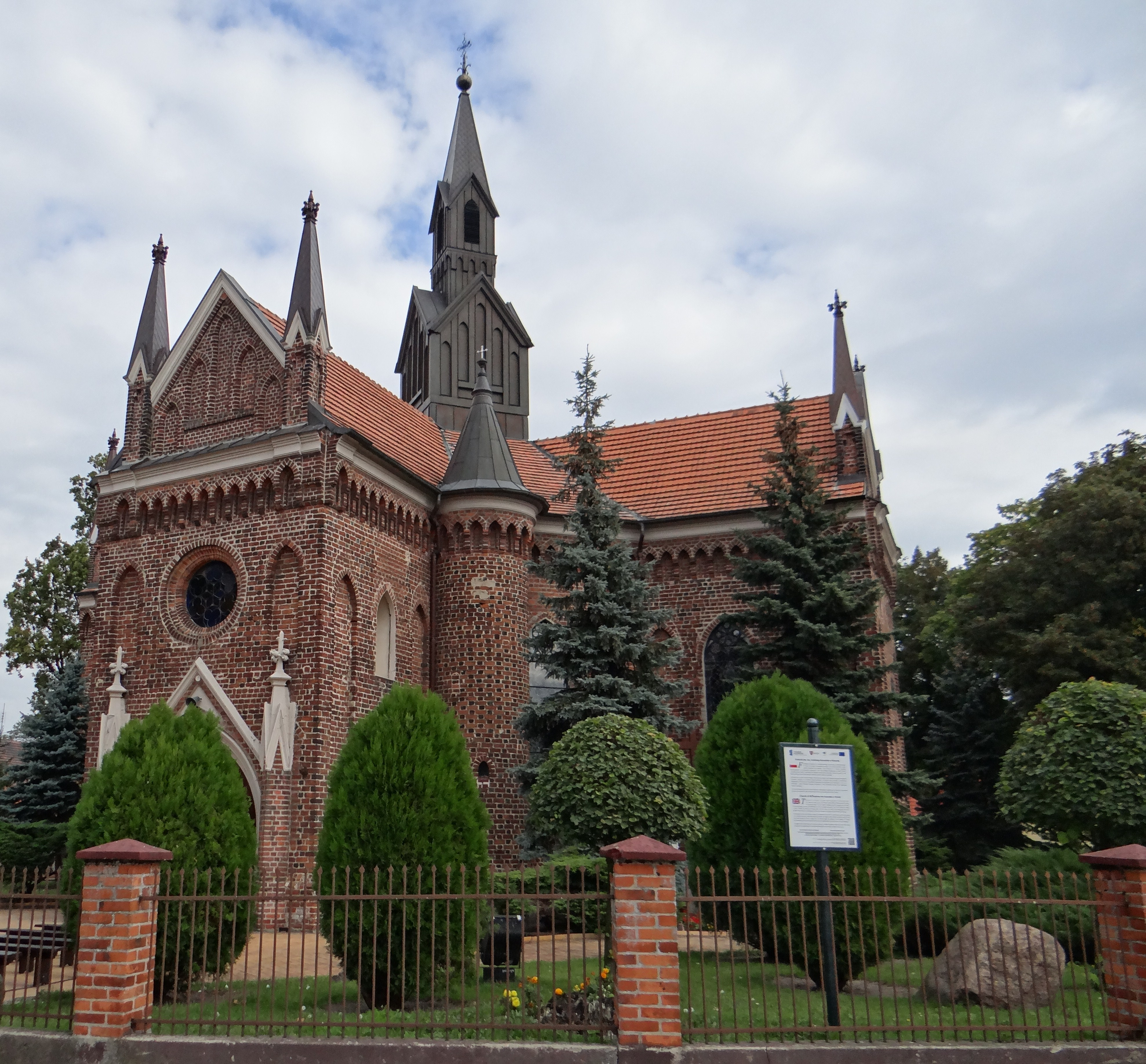
St. Andrew Church in Konin, co-founded by Andrzej Łaskarz

The bull of Pope Martin V of 1424 mentions Bishop Andrzej Łaskarz and his nephew Jan of Licheń as the founders of the church of Saint Andrew in Gosławice, present-day district of Konin. The town of Łaskarzew is named after the bishop whose efforts earned it town rights from King Władysław II Jagiełło in 1418.

== Memorials ==
In this church there is a team of 26 coats of arms placed on stone supports supporting the ribs of the church's vault. On the column supporting the vault, the Godziemba coat of arms is placed, which was donated by the founders (this coat of arms is still four times;

Marcin z Słupca, living in the 15th century, wrote a Latin poem entitled "Epitaph in honor of Andrzej Łaskarz". One of the streets of Poznań near the cathedral was given the name Andrzej Łaskarz.
