= Dobrogost of Nowy Dwór =

Medieval bishop in Poland

His Excellency Dobrowost of Nowy Dwór
- Archbishop of Gniezno
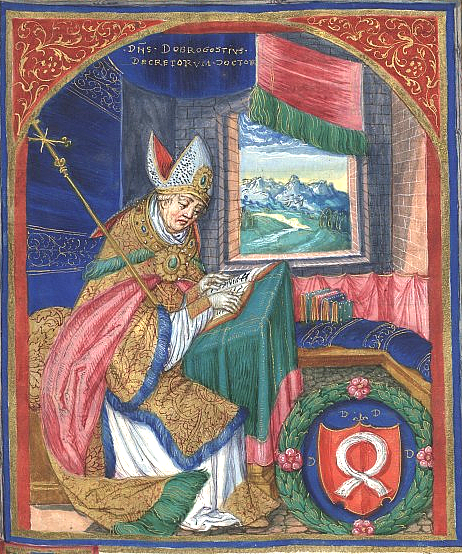
- Church: Roman Catholic
- Archdiocese: Gniezno
- Installed: 1394
- Term ended: 1401
- Predecessor: Jan Kropidło
- Successor: Mikołaj Kurowski

Personal details
- Born: 1355
- Died: 1401 (aged 45–46)
- Coat of arms

Dobrogost z Nowego Dwóru (died 14 September 1401) was a medieval bishop in Poland. He was Bishop of Poznań from 1384 until 1395 and then Archbishop of Gniezno from 1395 till 1401.

Dobrogost was born in 1355 into the Naleczów Polish noble family. In his youth he and his two brothers, Abraham and Niemierzym were granted by Prince Siemowit III, Duke of Masovia the Nowego Dworu (or "New Manor"). and he obtained a doctor of law at the University of Padua.

Between 1368 and 1374 was chancellor at the court of Siemowit III with whose support he was, on 16 April 1382 made archbishop of Gniezno. However, he was arrested on his way to Rome by King Louis I of Hungary due to his families role in Hungarian dynastic affairs. In June 1384, however, Louis gave Dobrogost the bishopric in Poznań.

As bishop he undertook a diplomatic mission to pope Urban VI on behalf of Władysław II Jagiełło, the result of which was a papal bull of 12 March 1388 forming a bishopric in Vilnius, and between 1386 and 1394 he was a papal collector.

On 17 May 1394 he was made Archbishop of Gniezno.

Archbishop Dobrogost died on 14 September 1401 in Chełmno and was buried in the Gniezno Cathedral.

Religious titles
Preceded by Jan Kropidło	Bishop of Poznan; 1384–1395	Succeeded by Mikołaj Kurowski
