= Łaskarzew =

Town in Masovian Voivodeship, Poland

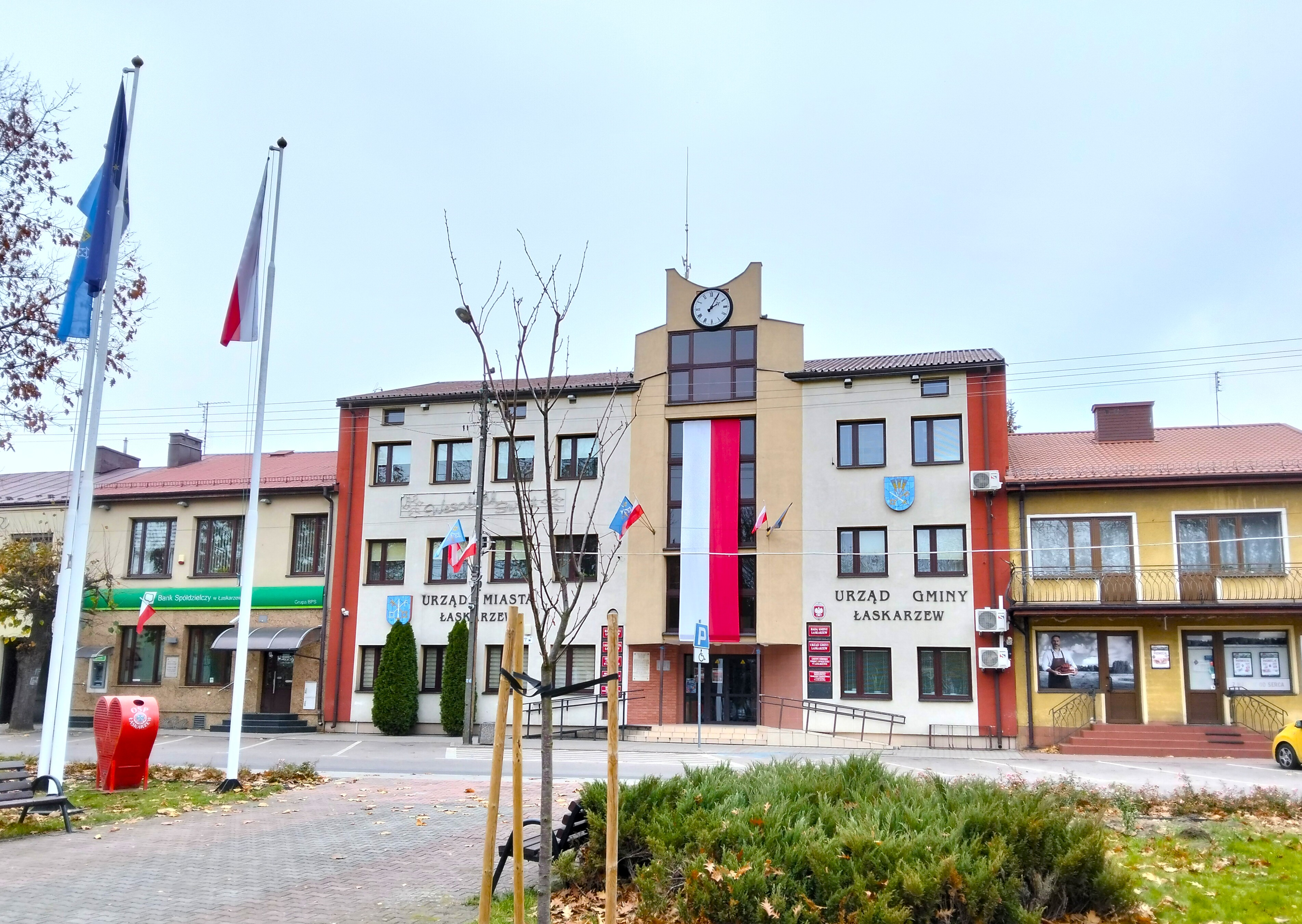
- Town hall

- Flag Coat of arms

- Location within Poland
- Coordinates: 51°47′24″N 21°35′33″E
- Country: Poland
- Voivodeship: Masovian
- County: Garwolin
- Gmina: Łaskarzew (urban gmina)
- Town rights: 1418
- Named for: Andrzej Łaskarz

Government
  - Mayor: Anna Laskowska

Population (2006)
  - Total: 4,908
- Time zone: UTC+1 (CET)
  - Summer (DST): UTC+2 (CEST)
- Postal code: 08-450
- Area code: +48 25
- Car plates: WG
- Website: https://www.miastolaskarzew.pl/

Łaskarzew [wasˈkaʐɛf] is a town in Garwolin County (15 kilometres (9 miles) from Garwolin), Masovian Voivodeship, in east-central Poland, with 4,908 inhabitants (2006). It is located on the Promnik river, which is a tributary of the Vistula, near the Garwolin Forests, on the border of historic Polish provinces of Lesser Poland and Mazovia.

== History ==
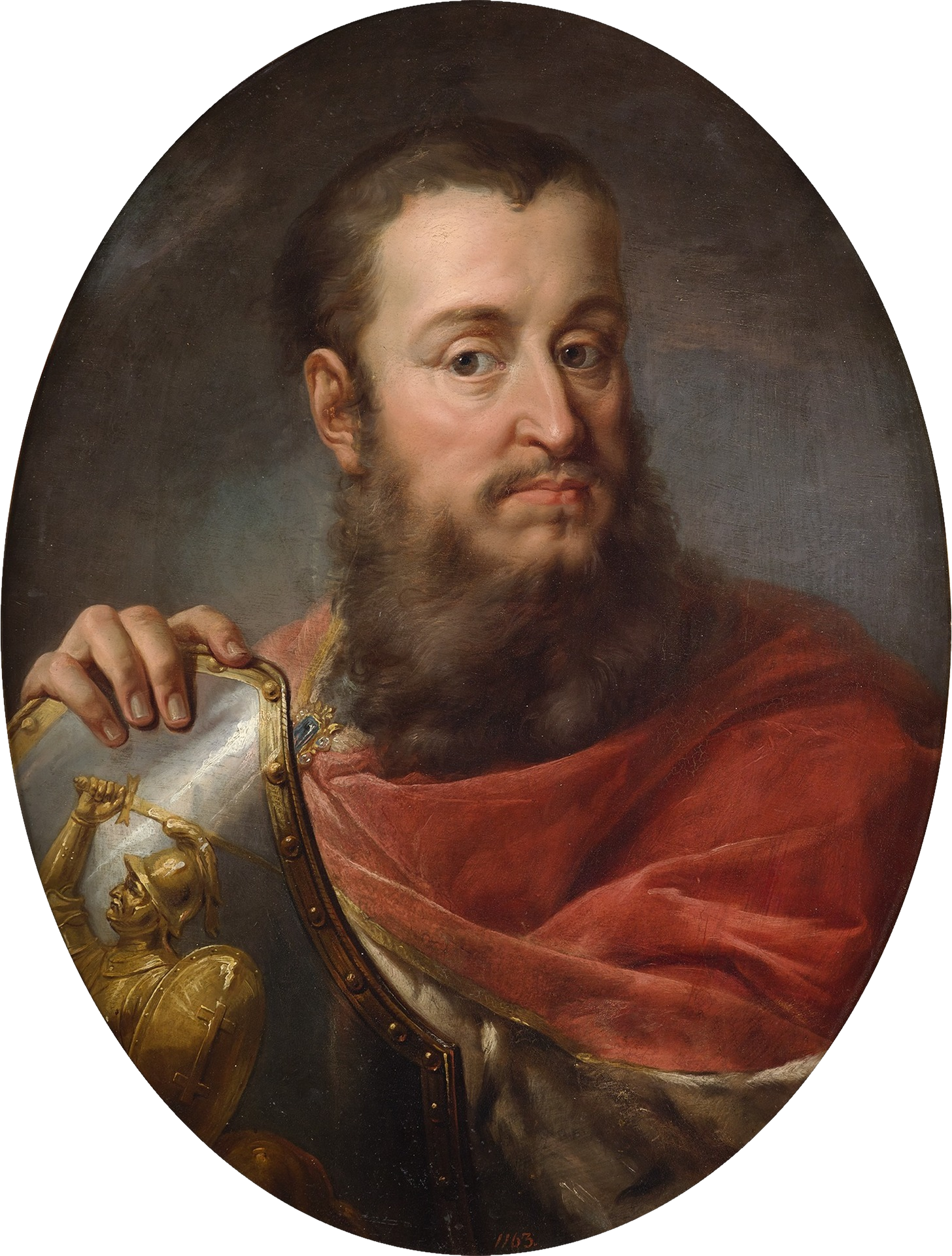
Polish King Władysław II Jagiełło vested Łaskarzew with town rights in 1418

The origins of the town date back to 1418. At that time, on the left bank of the Promnik was a village called Gorczycew, located in the corner of Lesser Poland's Sandomierz Voivodeship (the Promnik marks the border between Lesser Poland and Mazovia). Upon request of Bishop of Poznań, Andrzej Łaskarz, King Władysław II Jagiełło agreed to locate the newly established town of Łaskarzew (named in honor of the bishop) on the right, Mazovian bank of the Promnik. The bishop favored this location, as the new town belonged to his diocese, not the Diocese of Kraków. Currently Łaskarzew lies on both sides of the river, and the district on the left, Lesser Polish bank, is still called Gorczycew.

In 1514, another Bishop of Poznań, Jan Lubrański, decided to expand the town, and allowed local residents to cut down a forest near the village of Pilczyn, creating New Łaskarzew (Nowy Łaskarzew). In the 17th century, the town had two mills, and 100 years later, in 1764, a wooden town hall was erected. Łaskarzew also had a hospital (since the 15th century), and a school, since 1629. It also was a local center of brewing and liquor industry, there also were market days, which attracted local inhabitants and merchants.

Łaskarzew was annexed by Austria in the Third Partition of Poland in 1795. Following the Austro-Polish War of 1809, it was regained by the Poles and included within the short-lived Duchy of Warsaw. After the duchy's dissolution, in 1815, the town fell to the Russian Partition of Poland. During the January Uprising, it was the site of a battle between Polish insurgents and Russian troops on January 28, 1863. It was stripped of its town rights by Russian authorities in 1870 as punishment after the unsuccessful January Uprising, and remained a village until the 1920s, when it already belonged to the Second Polish Republic. During the Polish–Soviet War, on August 16, 1920, it was the site of a battle between Poles and Russian invaders. According to the 1921 census, the town with the adjacent railway settlement had a population of 3,447, 81.5% Polish and 18.5% Jewish by declared nationality.

=== World War II ===
During the German invasion of Poland, which started World War II in 1939, Łaskarzew was defended from September 15 to September 17, and during the fighting, almost the whole town was burned. On September 17, 1939, invading German forces murdered 58 people in the town, including 34 Jews and 24 Poles (see Nazi crimes against the Polish nation). The victims included elderly people as old as 75 years. Later on, Łaskarzew was a center of Polish resistance. Several Poles from Łaskarzew were murdered by the Russians in the Katyn massacre in 1940. On September 27, 1942, German forces deported 1,240 Jews to the Treblinka extermination camp. In Łaskarzew, Polish and Soviet units concentrated in the summer of 1944 for the Vistula river crossing.

== Sights ==
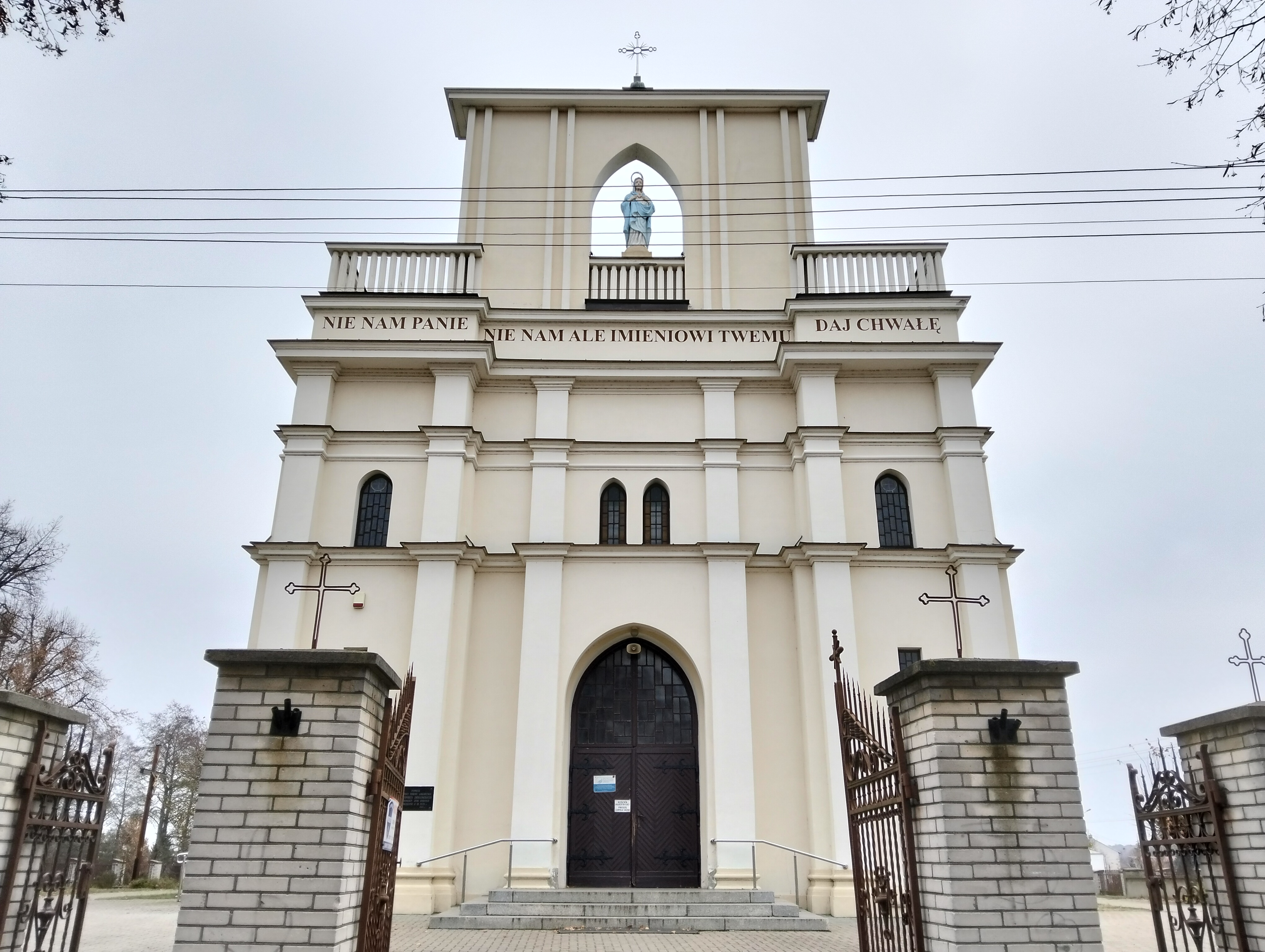
Exaltation of the Holy Cross church

Among points of interest there are the Exaltation of the Holy Cross church (1884), destroyed during World War II, and rebuilt in 1946, and a cemetery chapel from 1847.

== Transport ==
The town has had a rail station since 1877. The Polish S17 highway, which is part of the European route E372, runs nearby, some 11 km (7 mi) east of Łaskarzew.
