= Kurowo railway station =

Railway station in Pomeranian Voivodeship, Poland

Kurowo

General information
- Location: Kurowo; Poland
- Coordinates: 54.731899°N 17.828252°E
- Owner: Polskie Koleje Państwowe S.A.
- Platforms: Never existed

Construction
- Structure type: Building: Never existed Depot: No; Water tower: Never existed

History
- Former names: Kurow until 1945
Location

Kurowo is a non-operational PKP railway station on the disused PKP rail line 230 in Kurowo (Pomeranian Voivodeship), Poland.

== Lines crossing the station ==
Start station	End station	Line type
Wejherowo	Garczegorze	Closed
