= John of Falkenberg =

German Dominican theologian and writer

John of Falkenberg or Johannes Falkenberg (born in Falkenberg, Pomerania, date unknown; died about 1418 in Italy — or, according to other accounts, in his native town) was a German Dominican theologian and writer.

His prominence in medieval history is due partly to the share he took in the Western Schism, but chiefly to his involving himself in the long-standing disputes between the Teutonic Knights of Prussia on one side and the allied Kingdom of Poland and Grand Duchy of Lithuania on the other. He is known as one of the first thinkers to advocate genocide of another nation.

== Life ==
Little is known about his early life, save that he entered the Order of St. Dominic and spent his novitiate in the convent at Kammin. The fact that he was a master in Sacred Theology indicates that for a number of years he taught philosophy and theology in his order.

In opposition to many of his brethren and the general of his order, Bernard de Datis, who were firm adherents of the antipopes Alexander V and John XXIII, Falkenberg was an adherent of Pope Gregory XII. He carried his opposition so far as to refuse publicly in the Council of Constance to acknowledge Bernard as his superior.

== Works ==
In the conflict between the Teutonic Knights on the one side, and Polish King Jogaila and Lithuanian Duke Vytautas on the other, Falkenberg supported the Knights, who waged a 100-year crusade against the pagan Grand Duchy of Lithuania.

At the time both sides submitted the dispute for mediation to the Council of Constance.

Falkenberg wrote a book, Liber de doctrina, published 1416, opposing Polish scholar Paulus Vladimiri. Liber de doctrina argued that the King of Poland and his adherents were idolators, and unbelievers; that the opposition against them was noble and praiseworthy. In Liber de doctrina Falkenberg justified the tyrannicide advocated by the Franciscan Jean Petit. Falkenberg concluded that it was lawful to kill the King of Poland and his associates.

Falkenberg also argued, in Liber de doctrina, that "the Emperor has the right to slay even peaceful infidels simply because they are pagans (...). The Poles deserve death for defending infidels, and should be exterminated even more than the infidels; they should be deprived of their sovereignty and reduced to slavery." Stanislaus F. Belch in his work Paulus Vladimiri and his Doctrine concerning International Law and Politics wrote that he was the first writer to formulate justification of genocide.

Falkenberg also published Satira in 1412, further attacking the Poles and King Jogaila. At this time King Jogaila was Christian, as was Lithuania. Falkenberg called King Jogaila a "mad dog," unworthy to be king. In a later work Tres tractatuli, published in 1416 Falkenberg attempted to refute Jean Gerson, Pierre d'Ailly, and other doctors of the University of Paris, who had condemned the works of Jean Petit. In this work, moreover, he denied the bishops the right to declare his book or any part of it heretical, claiming that in matters of faith the pope and general councils alone are infallible.

By order of Nicolaus, Archbishop of Gniezno, Falkenberg was imprisoned. The Poles demanded the conviction of Falkenberg for heresy, but in vain. His works were condemned by the Council of Constance as scandalously libelous, but not heretical. A similar verdict was given by the Dominican Order, assembled at Strasbourg from May to June 1417, which also condemned the author to life imprisonment. On his return to Rome, Pope Martin V took Falkenberg with him, and kept him for several years in close confinement. Whether he eventually regained his liberty or died there is uncertain.
