= Kurkovo =

Kurkovo Курково
- Village
- Location within Vladimir Oblast Location within Russia
- Coordinates: 55°54′N 42°02′E
- Country: Russia
- Region: Vladimir Oblast
- District: Selivanovsky District
- Time zone: UTC+3:00

Kurkovo (Russian: Курково) is a rural locality (a village) in Chertkovskoye Rural Settlement, Selivanovsky District, Vladimir Oblast, Russia. The population was 16 as of 2010.

== Geography ==
Kurkovo is located 26 km east of Krasnaya Gorbatka (the district's administrative centre) by road. Chertkovo is the nearest rural locality.
