= Kurów (disambiguation) =

Kurów may refer to the following places in Poland:

- Kurów in Puławy County, Lublin Voivodeship (east Poland)
- Kurów, Lower Silesian Voivodeship (south-west Poland)
- Kurów, Bełchatów County in Łódź Voivodeship (central Poland)
- Kurów, Kutno County in Łódź Voivodeship (central Poland)
- Kurów, Wieluń County in Łódź Voivodeship (central Poland)
- Kurów, Łuków County in Lublin Voivodeship (east Poland)
- Kurów, Nowy Sącz County in Lesser Poland Voivodeship (south Poland)
- Kurów, Świętokrzyskie Voivodeship (south-central Poland)
- Kurów, Sucha County in Lesser Poland Voivodeship (south Poland)
- Kurów, Konin County in Greater Poland Voivodeship (west-central Poland)
- Kurów, Gmina Nowe Skalmierzyce, Ostrów County in Greater Poland Voivodeship (west-central Poland)
- Kurów, West Pomeranian Voivodeship (north-west Poland)
