= Kurovsky =

Kurovsky or Kurovskoy (both masculine), Kurovskaya (feminine), or Kurovskoye (neuter) may refer to:

- Vitaly Kurovsky, songwriter, author of Odna kalyna
- Yevgeny Kurovsky, Governor of Voronezh Governorate, Russian Empire, in 1890–1894
- Kurovskoye Urban Settlement, a municipal formation which the Town of Kurovskoye in Orekhovo-Zuyevsky District of Moscow Oblast, Russia is incorporated as
- Kurovskoy Urban Settlement, a former municipal formation in Dzerzhinsky Municipal District of Kaluga Oblast, Russia, merged into Kaluga Urban Okrug in October 2012
- Kurovsky (inhabited locality) (Kurovskoy, Kurovskaya, Kurovskoye), several inhabited localities in Russia
