= Kurskoye, Belgorod Oblast =

Kurskoye Курское
- Selo
- Location within Belgorod Oblast Location within Russia
- Coordinates: 51°21′N 37°59′E
- Country: Russia
- Region: Belgorod Oblast
- District: Starooskolsky District
- Time zone: UTC+3:00

Kurskoye (Russian: Курское) is a rural locality (a selo) in Starooskolsky District, Belgorod Oblast, Russia. The population was 651 as of 2010. There are 25 streets.

== Geography ==
Kurskoye is located 15 km northeast of Stary Oskol (the district's administrative centre) by road. Lapygino is the nearest rural locality.
