= Kur coat of arms =

Polish coat of arms

Kur
- Battle cry: Kur
- Alternative names: Kur Biały, Kokot
- Earliest mention: 1496
- Cities: Kurów, Kurozwęki, Oława
- Divisions: Kurkowszczyzna
- Families: 19 names Bosowski, Gall, Horodyński, Karszański, Karszeński, Kazimierski, Kiczka, Kokot, Kur, Kurakowski, Kurek, Kurowski, Kurski, Kurzecki, Kurzewski, Kurzyk, Kurzyna, Szaprowski, Opersdorf

Kur is a Polish coat of arms. It was used by several noble families forming a Clan of Kur in the times of the Kingdom of Poland and the Polish–Lithuanian Commonwealth. It is noted during the reign of the Jagiellon dynasty and illustrated with its original name in the work of Bartosz Paprocki "Herby Rycerstwa Polskiego" in 1584. Furthermore, it is published in the work of Szymon Okolski in 1641. and several other publications

The Kur coat of arms have also been used before Jagiellon dynasty time in Poland under alternative name Kokoty, which can be seen in the court documents holding stamps of the CoA, signed by the judge Szyban von Der (from Der of Misni) between 1287 and 1311 in the court of Henry III, prince of Głogów. The person of Szyban von Der have been incorrectly identified by Franciszek Piekosinski as Szyban Tadera of the Gryf coat of arms, the castellan of Swiny.

The most notable member of the Clan of Kur was Mikołaj Kiczka, the Archdeacon of Gniezno and one of the most trusted procurators to the King Władysław Jagiełło. On behalf of the king, he negotiated with the Teutonic Knights to establish borders delineation with Poland in Rome 1421–1422 in presence of the Pope Martin V.

Families of the Clan of Kur were in the medieval times of same origin. The clan and its land is closely connected to the Mazovia region of Poland. Although nobility Mazovia received equal rights as in the rest of Poland, it retained independent status until 1529, when Sigismund I the Old incorporated Mazovia into the Polish state. Outside the Mazovia region, the clan members are also found in other regions of the Commonwealth, including Silesia, Podlaskie Voivodeship and Lublin.

== History ==
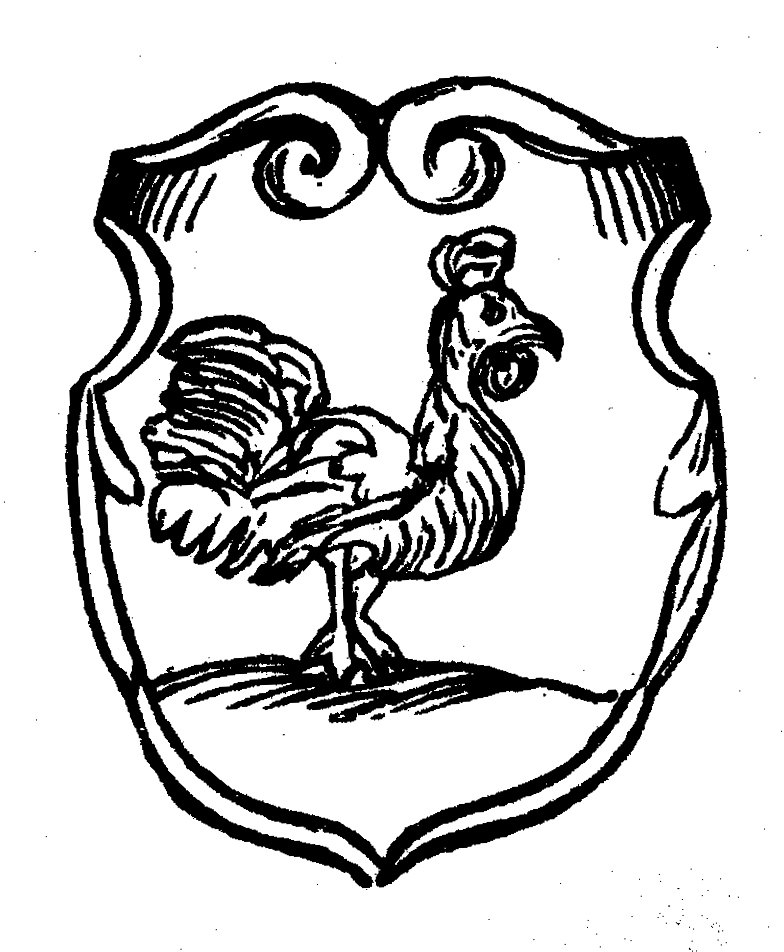
Kur coat of arms - illustration from "Herby Rycerstwa Polskiego" Bartosz Paprocki, 1584

The Kur coat of arms and its battle cry is noted in Polish heraldry in 1496. Earlier notes confirming graphic form of the CoA but without battle cry are from year 1300.

The notes of 1496 tells about the King John I Albert that created this coat of arms for the Kur family. The date is close to the Piotrków privilege from 1493 and the confirmation of the ruling house by Konrad III Rudy, duke of Masovia. The Piotrków privilege made the Masovian nobility equal to Polish in rights which explain that the documents regarding the Clan of Kur is not act of nobility but act of equal rights. Before adding Kur coat of arms to Polish heraldry 1496, the name was known as Kokoty and is noted in court documents referring to Mikołaj Kiczka in 1426. Late appearance of the Kur coat of arms in Polish heraldry is explained by the tradition in Masovia that formed coat of arms in European style later than in other parts of Poland. In Europe, the symbol of the Kur coat of arms is well known from ancient years, it origin from Italy where it can be found under the name Gallo and later made its way through France, Spain, Netherlands, Scotland and Poland.

=== Legend of the CoA ===
The legend tells that the Kur coat of arms have been given to the knight for service and for saving King's camp during military campaign. The night have been alert during the night and spotted sudden enemy attack and by that saving the king's life. The legend has been written down by Szymon Okolski in his work of Orbis Polonus Splendoribus Coeli... in 1641–1643. This is also recalled in the book of Kasper Niesiecki.

Kur II coat of arms

=== Symbolics and oldest document ===
First notes about the Clan of Kur are dated to year 1239 and are to be found in the Codex Diplomaticus of Płock. Documents tell about property of Dojazdowo that was purchased by a knight named Kur.

The symbolics of Rooster in coat of arms as well as the color of the shield are to be found in both Christian as in pagan cultures and refer to similar values: manhood, courage and vigilance, red color of the shield means energy, enthusiasm and blood. The gold in the coat of arms tell about richness and inner value of the soul. In Ancient Greece a Rooster was together with the owl symbol of the bird of Goddess of the Athen.

=== Families of the Clan of Kur ===
Most of the families that use Kur as their coat of arms lived in the Duchy of Mazovia, mostly in the counties of Ostrołęka, Wołomin including Stanisławów and in the east part of Grand Duchy of Lithuania. Families related to Clan of Kur often have surnames that refer to the origin of the Clan, such as Kur, Kurek, Kurski, Kurzewski, Kurak, Kurakowski, Kurowski, Kurzecki, Kurzyk or Kurzyna. Most of those families share an ancestor, a knight named Kur who lived in Mazovia in the 12th or 13th century. The etymology of the word Kur has been described in several publications. Other families that belong to the Clan of Kur are families of Karszeński (Karszański), Horodyński, Bosowski, Szaprowski, Kokot, Kiczka, Gall, Kazimierski and count Oppersdorff that received noble rights in Poland and was adopted to the Clan of Kur. Count Oppersdorff received recognition for his support to the Polish side in the war against Sweden during the time of the Deluge and for offering shelter to the Polish king and his wife in his castle during 1655.

== Blazon ==
Gules a cock Argent, armed Or. Crest: as in the shield.

== Notable bearers ==
Notable bearers of this coat of arms include:

- Kurowie
  - Klemens Kurowski Castellan of Żarnów
  - Mikołaj Kiczka Archdeacon of Gniezno
- Czesław Kurowski Chorąży, Feldsher

== See also ==
- Polish heraldry
- Heraldry
- Coat of arms
- List of Polish nobility coats of arms
