= Kursk, Altai Krai =

Kursk Курск
- Selo
- Location within Altai Krai Location within Russia
- Coordinates: 52°26′N 78°55′E
- Country: Russia
- Region: Altai Krai
- District: Kulundinsky District
- Time zone: UTC+7:00

Kursk (Russian: Курск) is a rural locality (a selo) and the administrative center of Kursky Selsoviet, Kulundinsky District, Altai Krai, Russia. The population was 825 as of 2013. There are 6 streets.

== Geography ==
Kursk is located 15 km south of Kulunda (the district's administrative centre) by road. Voskresenovka is the nearest rural locality.
