= Klemens Kurowski =

Polish nobleman and senator

Klemens Kurowski (born 1340-before 1405) was a Polish knight, nobleman and senator from Drożojewice and Kurów.

Kur coat of arms

Szreniawa coat of arms - (new one - 1396)

Born around 1340, he died before 140. He came from Kurów near Szczyrzyc and Wiśnicz. He became a castellan of Żarnów. Between 1400 and 1405 he became a senator.

As first in his family he used the Szreniawa coat of arms. As was mandatory in his epoch, he changed his previous Kur coat of arms to the Szreniawa one as he served under starosta Jan Kmita from Wiśnicz - starosta of Red Ruthenia (thus accepting his coat of arms as his).

"System Chorągwiany" Clan Banner system - Members of military unit, serving under their commander changed their Coat of Arms to that of their Commander.

Roots of his family lies in masovian family of Kur. Settled in Małopolska since Konrad Mazowiecki ride on Kraków Voivodeship.

In year 1399 by King Władysław II Jagiełło decret Klemens Kurowski became owner of Kurów in Puławy powiat. On 6 January 1442 his son Piotr Kurowski managed to convince King of Poland Władysław III to change law ruling in city from Polish town privileges to Magdeburg rights. City obtains same coat of arms as his previous one: White Cock.

Kurów coat of arms

Noteworthy is information about Bochotnica Castle (bought in 1399 from Jan of Bejsc), with at end of 15th century was transferred into hands of Anna Zbąska of Nałęcz.

Oldest document signed by Klemens Kurowski with Szreniawa coat of arms was dated 1396 and was made in first year of functioning as castellan of Żarnów.

- Father of Piotr Kurowski - (Piotr from Kurów near Puławy and Szreniawa) starosta of Lublin, castellan of Nowy Sącz and Lublin
- Father of Mikołaj Kurowski - Catholic hierarch - Archbishop of Gniezno, great chancellor of Kingdom of Poland, Primate of Poland

== Bibliography ==
- Adam Boniecki - Herbarz Polski, Skład główny Gebethner i Wolf w Warszawie, Warszawa 1909, vol XIII page 245-246, Kurowscy Herbu Szreniawa.
- dr Marek Jerzy Minakowski "Ci wielcy Polacy to nasza rodzina" Kraków 2007
