= Marian Kurowski =

Polish football manager

Personal information
- Date of birth: 15 February 1949 (age 77)
- Place of birth: Szamotuły, Poland

Managerial career
- Years: Team
- 1977–1989: Sparta Szamotuły
- S.C. Lightning Chicago
- 1995: Amica Wronki
- 1995–1996: Amica Wronki (assistant)
- 1996: Amica Wronki
- 1996–1999: Amica Wronki (assistant)
- 1997: Amica Wronki (caretaker)
- 1998: Amica Wronki (caretaker)
- 1999: Amica Wronki (caretaker)
- 1999–2000: Lech Poznań
- 2000–2001: Obra Kościan
- 2001: Odra Opole
- 2003–2004: Mieszko Gniezno
- 2004–2005: Mławianka Mława
- 2006–2007: Amica Wronki
- 2007–2009: Lech Poznań (ME)
- 2009: Tur Turek
- 2009: Tur Turek
- 2009–2012: Lubuszanin Trzcianka
- 2012–2013: Polonia Środa Wielkopolska

Marian Kurowski (born 15 February 1949) is a Polish former professional football manager.
