= Sebastian Kurowski =

Polish footballer

Personal information
- Full name: Sebastian Kurowski
- Date of birth: 30 January 1988 (age 38)
- Place of birth: Gorlice, Poland
- Height: 1.75 m (5 ft 9 in)
- Position: Striker

Senior career*
Years	Team	Apps	(Gls)
2004	Glinik/Karpatia Gorlice		
2004–2006	Cracovia II		
2006–2011	Cracovia	4	(0)
2007–2008	→ Kmita Zabierzów (loan)	19	(4)
2009	→ Kolejarz Stróże (loan)	13	(4)
2011	Polonia Przemyśl	7	(1)
2012	Stal Sanok	10	(6)
2013–2014	LKS Czeluśnica		
2015	Lepietnica Klikuszowa		
2015	Podhale Nowy Targ	4	(0)
2016	Wiatr Ludźmierz		
2018	Szarotka Uherce	16	(26)
2019–2020	Lubań Maniowy	27	(9)
2021	Ciężkowianka Ciężkowice	1	(0)
- * Club domestic league appearances and goals

Sebastian Kurowski (born 30 January 1988) is a Polish former professional footballer who played as a striker.

== Career ==
He was released from Cracovia on 16 June 2011.
