= Kurskaya, Stavropol Krai =

Rural locality in Stavropol Krai, Russia

Coordinates: 44°02′23″N 44°27′49″E

Kurskaya (Russian: Курская) is a rural locality (a stanitsa) and the administrative center of Kursky District, Stavropol Krai, Russia. Population: 12,045 (2010 census); 11,824 (2002 census); 10,562 (1989 Soviet census).
