= Kursky District, Stavropol Krai =

Kursky District Курский район (Russian)
- District
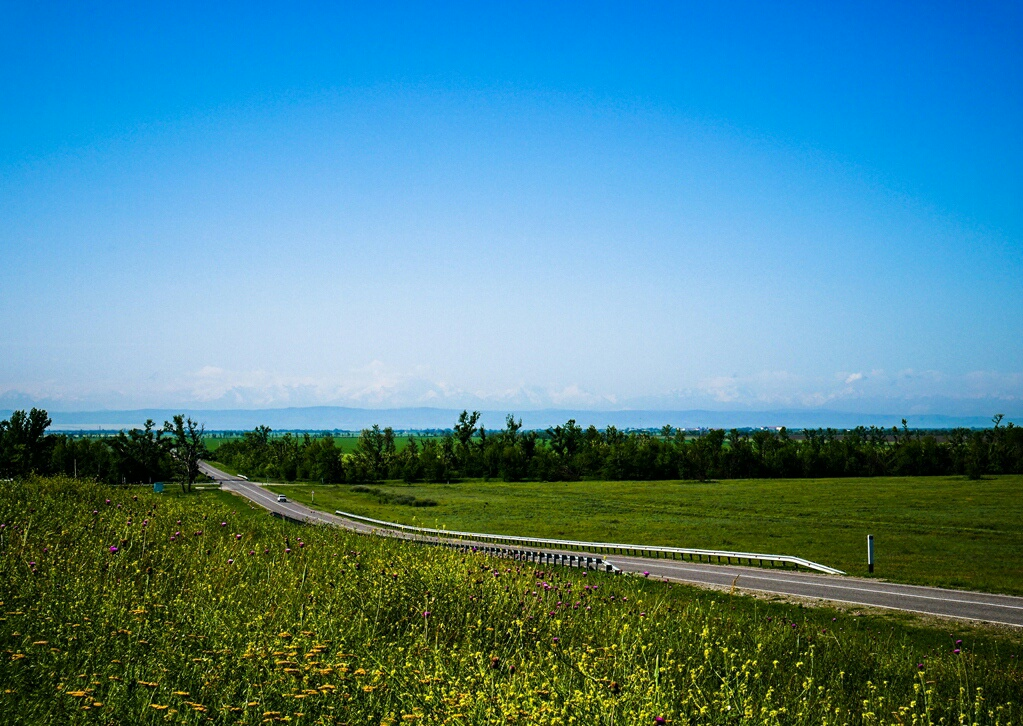
- Landscape near Sernovodskoe, Kursky District

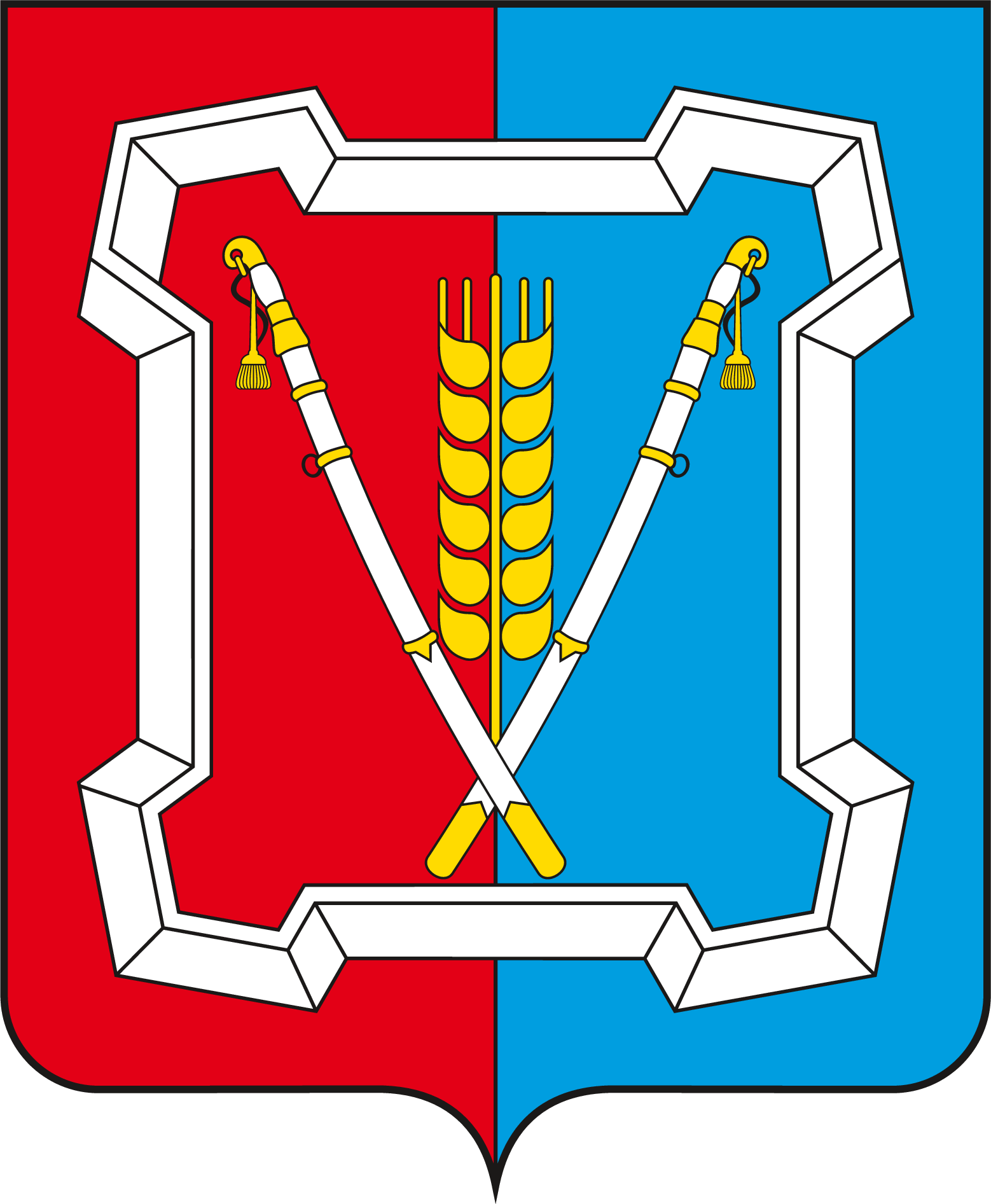
- Flag Coat of arms
- Location of Kursky District in Stavropol Krai
- Coordinates: 44°02′N 44°28′E
- Country: Russia
- Federal subject: Stavropol Krai
- Established: 1935
- Administrative center: Kurskaya

Area
  - Total: 3,694 km^{2} (1,426 sq mi)

Population (2010 Census)
  - Total: 54,054
  - Density: 14.63/km^{2} (37.90/sq mi)
  - Urban: 0%
  - Rural: 100%

Administrative structure
  - Administrative divisions: 10 Selsoviets
  - Inhabited localities: 47 rural localities

Municipal structure
  - Municipally incorporated as: Kursky Municipal District
  - Municipal divisions: 0 urban settlements, 12 rural settlements
- Time zone: UTC+3 (MSK)
- OKTMO ID: 07633000
- Website: http://administraciykmr.ru

Kursky District (Russian: Ку́рский райо́н) is an administrative district (raion), one of the twenty-six in Stavropol Krai, Russia. Municipally, it is incorporated as Kursky Municipal District. It is located in the southeast of the krai. The area of the district is 3,694 square kilometers (1,426 sq mi). Its administrative center is the rural locality (a stanitsa) of Kurskaya. Population: 54,054 (2010 census); 52,100 (2002 Census); 43,303 (1989 Census). The population of Kurskaya accounts for 22.3% of the district's total population.
