= Kursky, Republic of Adygea =

Kursky Курский Курскэр
- Khutor
- Location within Republic of Adygea Location within Russia
- Coordinates: 44°46′N 40°22′E
- Country: Russia
- Region: Adygea
- District: Giaginsky District
- Time zone: UTC+3:00

Kursky (Russian: Курский; Adyghe: Курскэр) is a rural locality (a khutor) in Sergiyevskoye Rural Settlement of Giaginsky District, Adygea, Russia. The population was 127 as of 2018. There are 5 streets.

== Geography ==
The khutor is located on the right bank of the Fars River, 37 km southeast of Giaginskaya (the district's administrative centre) by road. Sergiyevskoye is the nearest rural locality.
