= Eva Kurowski =

German jazz musician and singer (born 1965)

Eva Kurowski (born 1965) is a German jazz musician and singer.

== Life ==
Kurowski was born in the Ruhr area in 1965. Music was a constant presence in her life from an early age. A shawm band performed during her birth and the music of Billie Holiday was played on the record player at her home. Walter, her father, is a jazz musician and plays in many clubs in the Ruhr Valley, (K-14 in Oberhausen, Blue-Note in Eisenheim), and therefore she was exposed to jazz from an early age. She and her father, a communist, would participate in Easter marches and sing worker's songs.

She currently tours the Ruhr area with her jazz band.

Her book "Avanti Popoloch: Eine sozialistische Kindheit im Ruhrgebiet" (ISBN 3938834331) was published in 2008. In "Gott schmiert keine Stullen", published in 2012 by Rowohlt Polaris, she recollects her childhood.

== Music ==
Kurowski writes her own music and words, based in a classical jazz sound. Her female perspective in her songs is influenced by daily life in the Ruhr Valley, and alternates between pop, children's songs and jazz.

Westdeutsche Allgemeine Zeitung described her as the "Billie Holiday of structural change [...] With a voice as black as coal..." ("Billie Holiday des Strukturwandels [...] Mit einer Stimme schwarz wie Kohle..."), and likened her to a "female Helge" ("weiblicher Helg"), for the breadth of her musical experience.

== Discography ==
- Reich ohne Geld (Empire Without Money) (2002, Roof-Music)
