= Kurowo, Pomeranian Voivodeship =

Kurowo
- Village
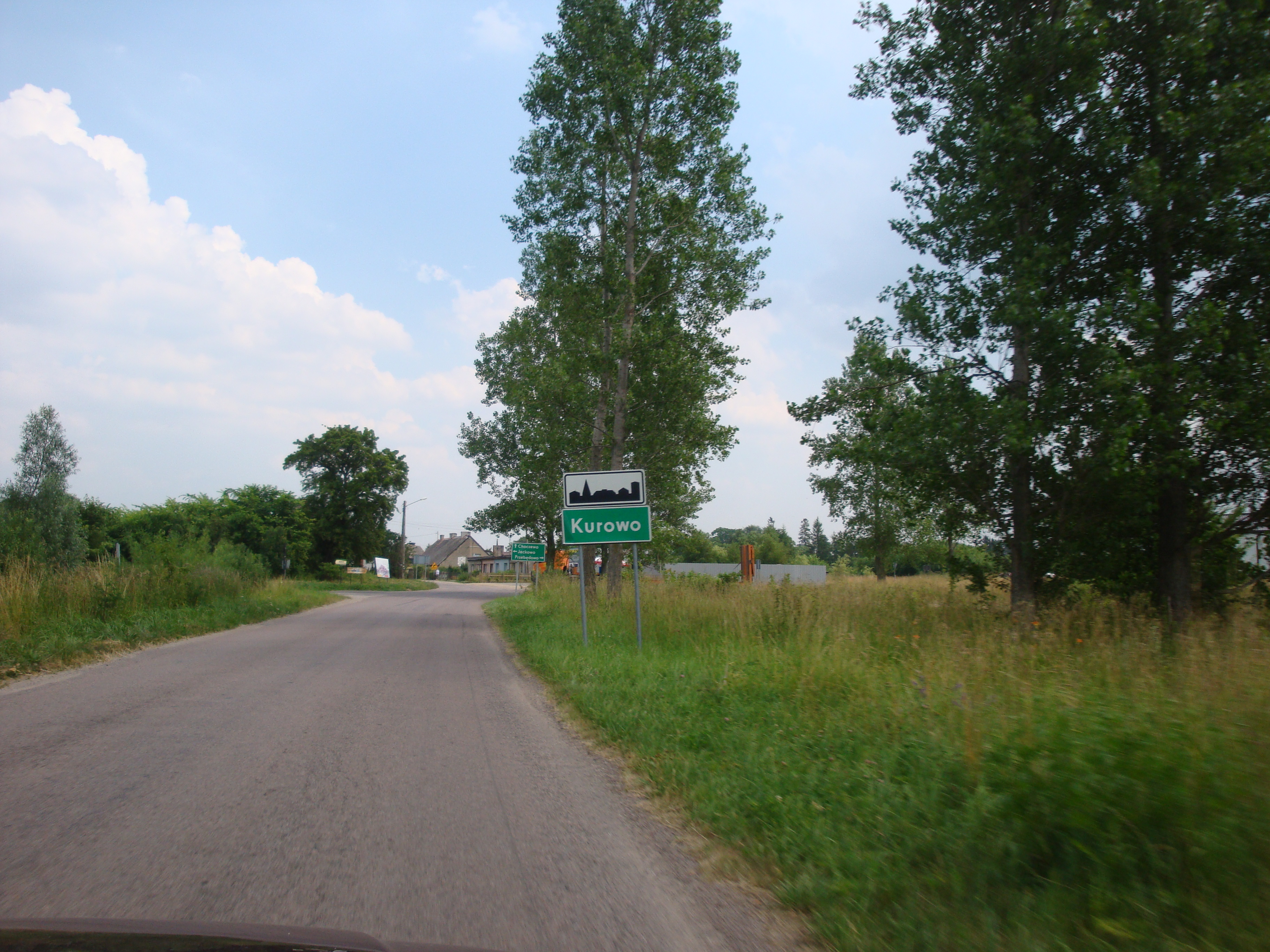

- Location within Poland
- Coordinates: 54°44′12″N 17°49′44″E
- Country: Poland
- Voivodeship: Pomeranian
- County: Wejherowo
- Gmina: Choczewo
- Population: 173

Kurowo ([kuˈrɔvɔ]) is a village in the administrative district of Gmina Choczewo, within Wejherowo County, Pomeranian Voivodeship, in northern Poland.

For details of the history of the region, see History of Pomerania.
