= Mikołaj Kurowski =

15th-century Polish politician and clergyman

His Excellency Mikołaj Kurowski
- Archbishop of Gniezno
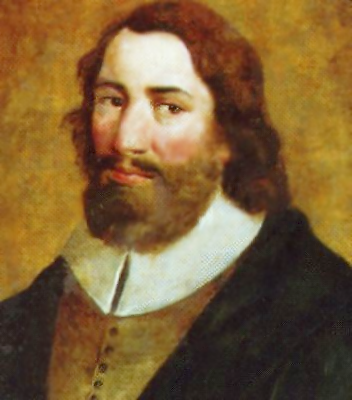
- Church: Roman Catholic
- Archdiocese: Gniezno
- Installed: 1402
- Term ended: 1411
- Predecessor: Dobrogost of Nowy Dwór
- Successor: Mikołaj Trąba

Personal details
- Born: 1355 Kurów
- Died: 7 September 1411 (aged 55–56) Ropczyce
- Coat of arms

Mikołaj Kurowski of Szreniawa of Kurów (died 1411) was a chancellor of the Kingdom of Poland and a Catholic hierarch. He held the posts of the bishop of Poznań, bishop of Włocławek and an archbishop of Gniezno. Releasing the name or adoptive Mirosław.

Born in Kurów near Bochnia, he was a son to the castellan of Żarnów Klemens Kurowski. In 1385, he received the title of Bachelor of Arts at the Charles University in Prague. For another ten years, he continued his studies there and in 1395 received the title of magister artium. During his stay in Bohemia, he became friends with some of the most prominent Polish politicians of the era to come, among them Paweł Włodkowic and Andrzej Łaskarz. Upon his return to Poland, he was ordained a priest. At the same time he started a political career as a clerk in the royal chancellery in Kraków.

Kurowski quickly advanced through the ranks of both religious and lay hierarchy and in 1395 was ordained a bishop of Poznań. In 1399, thanks to the support of King Władysław II of Poland, he became the royal chancellor and bishop of Wrocław. An active politician, he spent more time in the capital than in the distant capital of Silesia. In 1402, he yet again changed the bishopry and became the archbishop of Gniezno. As a diplomat, he took part in the Polish-Teutonic negotiations at Raciąż in 1404 and the council of Nowy Korczyn. He was also twice a member of the Polish embassy to the Grand Master of the Teutonic Order and, as the primate of Poland, he held the post of a regent during the king's absence. During the Battle of Grunwald, he fielded a banner of his own. After the battle he was one of the authors of the Peace of Thorn and the negotiations with Sigismund of Luxemburg.

Kurowski was seriously wounded on 7 September 1411 in an accident with his horse, and died later that day. He was buried in the Cathedral of Gniezno.

== Bibliography ==
- Adam Boniecki - Herbarz Polski, Skład główny Gebethner i Wolf w Warszawie, Warszawa 1909, vol XIII page 245–246, Kurowscy Herbu Szreniawa.ISBN 83-85490-08-6
- dr Marek Jerzy Minakowski "Ci wielcy Polacy to nasza rodzina" Kraków 2007
