= Anna Kurek (volleyball) =

Polish volleyball player (born 1993)

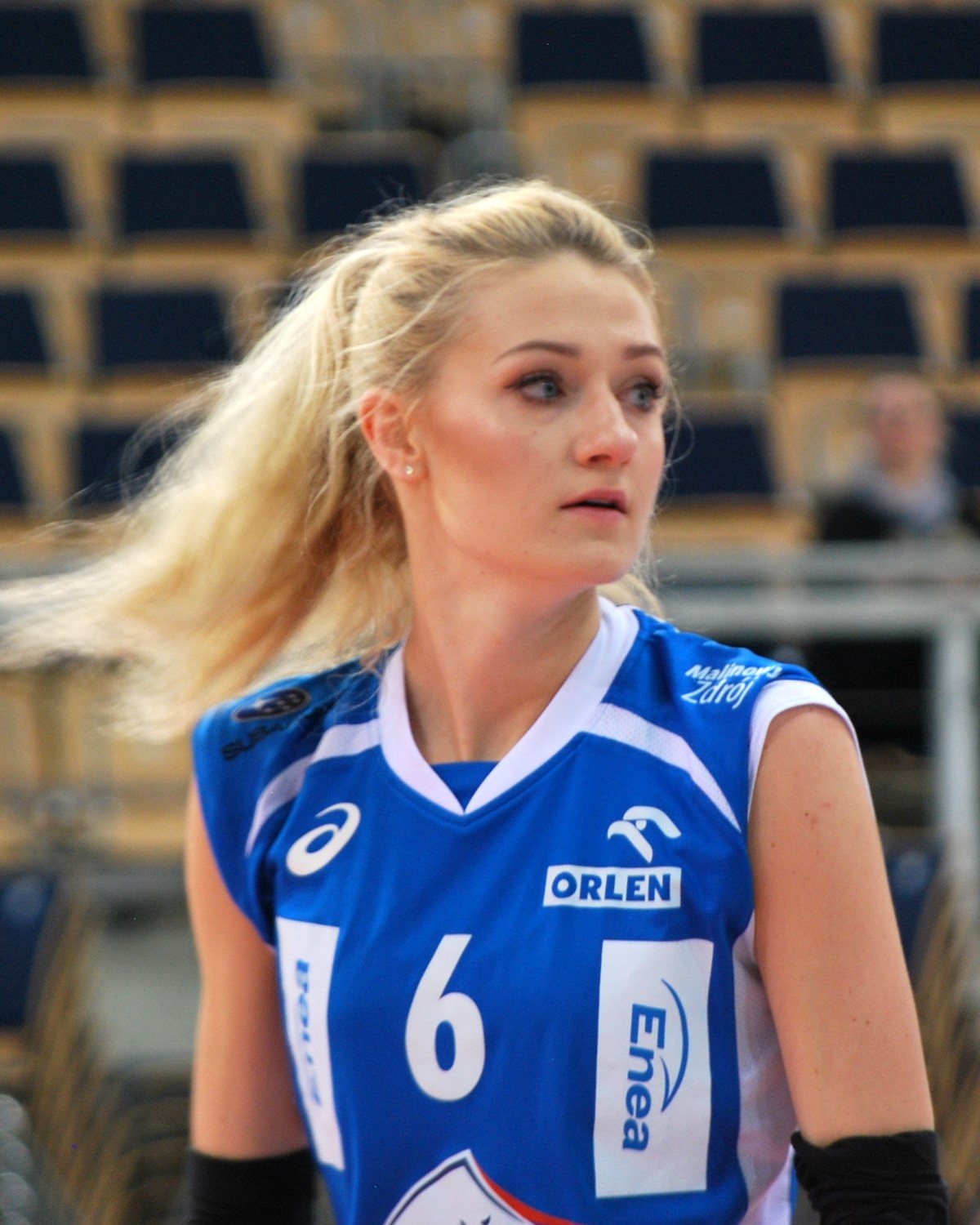

Personal information
- Full name: Anna Kurek
- Nationality: Polish
- Born: June 8, 1993 (age 33); Szczecin, Poland
- Height: 1.83 m (6 ft 0 in)
- Weight: 70 kg (150 lb)
- Spike: 307 cm (121 in)
- Block: 294 cm (116 in)

Volleyball information
- Position: Outside hitter
- Current team: Polski Cukier Muszyna
- Number: 6 (club), 25 (national team)

Career
Years	Teams
2008–2011; 2011–2013; 2013–2014; 2014–2015; 2015–	UKS Osiemnastka Szczecin; SMS PZPS Sosnowiec; Pałac Bydgoszcz; KPS Chemik Police; Impel Wrocław; Polski Cukier Muszyna

National team
2013–	Poland
- Last updated: 6 February 2017

Anna Kurek (née Grejman; born 8 June 1993) is a Polish volleyball player, a member of Poland women's national volleyball team and Polish club Polski Cukier Muszyna, 2014 Polish Champion.

== Career ==
=== Clubs ===
In season 2013/14 she achieved Polish Cup and her first title of Polish Champion with KPS Chemik Police. Then she moved to Impel Wrocław and was its player for one season. In 2015, she went to Polski Cukier Muszyna.

=== National team ===
She was a member of Poland U20 national team. On 2010 Junior European Championship she took with her national team 10th place and then on 2011 FIVB U20 World Championship took 9th place. In senior Polish national team she debuted on June 26, 2013 during the match with Cuba on 2013 Boris Yeltsin Cup.

== Personal life ==
She was born in Szczecin. Grejman is married to notable Polish volleyball player Bartosz Kurek.

== Sporting achievements ==
=== National championships ===
- 2013/2014 Polish Cup, with KPS Chemik Police
- 2013/2014 Polish Championship, with KPS Chemik Police
