= Paweł Włodkowic =

Polish scholar and jurist (ca. 1370–1435)

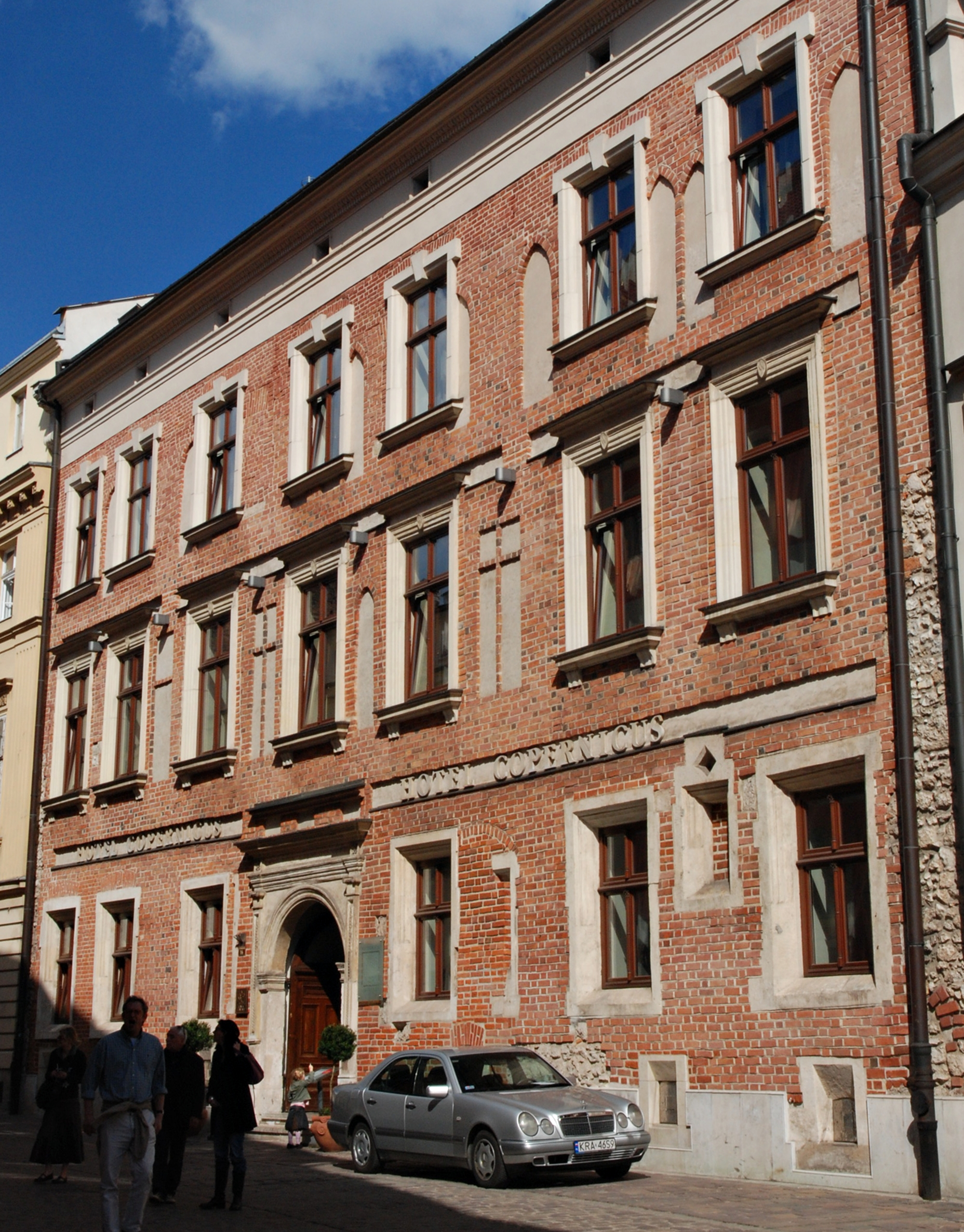
House on Kanonicza Street, Kraków, built by Paweł Włodkowic. Now Hotel Copernicus.

Paweł Włodkowic's Dołęga coat of arms

Paweł Włodkowic (Latin: Paulus Vladimiri; ca. 1370 – 9 October 1435) was a Polish scholar, jurist, statesman and rector of the Kraków Academy. He advocated a form of religious tolerance and defended Poland and non-Christian Baltic tribes against the Teutonic Knights and the crusading movement in general.

== Early life and education ==
Though it is commonly assumed that "Włodkowic" was a surname, it was in fact a patronymic denoting that he was the son of a certain Włodko or Włodzimierz of the Dołęga family. He was born in Brudzeń Duży near Dobrzyń nad Wisłą between 1370–1373. His family owned land in the Dobrzyń Province and was related to the Lasota family from Mazovia whose notable members include Mikołaj Lasota, the treasurer of Konrad of Mazovia. He was a graduate of the Collegiate Church of St. Michael School in Płock (currently the Marshal Stanisław Małachowski High School) where probably he was ordained as a priest. He studied at Prague University, where he took degrees in 1393. In 1400, he became the Canon of Płock. He continued studying law at Padua, Italy, in 1404–1408. It was probably in this period that he visited the Roman Curia in place of Piotr of Kobylin, fulfilling his duties as the Polish King's prosecutor.

In 1411 or 1412 he was made a doctor of canon law at the Academy in Kraków, where he also began to lecture. He was influenced by the philosophies of William of Ockham, Matthew of Cracow and Stanisław of Skarbimierz. In 1413 he served as King Jagiełło's emissary at Buda, Hungary, during disputes with the Teutonic Order. In 1414–1415 he became rector and in 1418 prorector of Cracow Academy.

== The Council of Constance Address ==
Paweł Włodkowic represented Poland at the 1414 Council of Constance, where he delivered a thesis about the power of the Pope and the Emperor, the Tractatus de potestate papae et imperatoris respectu infidelium (Treatise on the Power of the Pope and the Emperor Respecting Infidels). In it he drew the thesis that pagan and Christian peoples could coexist in peace and criticized the Teutonic Order for its wars of conquest of native non-Christian peoples in Prussia and Lithuania. Diarmaid MacCulloch wrote of Wlodkowic's thesis, "...Wlodkowic's case remains at the root of modern discussions of human rights and the right to freedom of religion.

Due to his religious and political influence, in 1421 Pope Martin V sent Antonio Zeno to investigate the Teutonic Order and its activities, though this investigation was later suspended on the grounds that it infringed upon the privileges of the new Holy Roman Emperor Sigismund, who wished to conduct his own negotiations between the two parties.

Włodkowic’s address at the council is considered to have been "not only one of the greatest achievements of Poland in their political fight against the Teutonic Order but also a huge contribution to the Christian theory of just war."

At the Council of Constance, Paweł Włodkowic and all the Polish delegation defended Jan Hus.

== Later life and death ==
In 1420 Paweł Włodkowic represented Poland at a conference between Poland and the Teutonic Order held in Wrocław under the aegis of Sigismund of Luxemburg.

As early as the beginning of the 15th century, along with Stanisław of Skarbimierz, Włodkowic strongly supported the idea of conciliarism and pioneered the notion of peaceful coexistence among nations – a forerunner of modern theories of human rights. Throughout his political, diplomatic and university career, Paweł Włodkowic expressed the view that a world guided by the principles of peace and mutual respect among nations was possible and that pagan nations had a right to peace and to possession of their own lands. For this, he, the king of Poland, and the entire Polish nation were virulently attacked by the Dominican John of Falkenberg (himself later condemned and imprisoned for his intemperance), and his thesis somewhat more judiciously rejected by Domenico da San Gimignano, Ardicino della Porta da Novara, and André Dias de Escobar, Bishop of Ciudad Rodrigo.

After 1424 he retired from public life to Kłodawa, where he died in 1435.

== Selected works ==
- Tractatus de annatis camerae apostolicae solvendis (1414-1415)
- Tractatus de potestate papae et imperatoris respectu infidelium (1415)
- Puncta accusationis ex parte Polonorum contra Cruciferos (1416)
- Causa inter reges Poloniae et Cruciferos coram concilio Constantiense ex parte Polonorum dicta (1416)
- Tractatus de ordine Cruciferorum et de bello Polonorum contra dictos fratres (1416)
- Scriptum denunciatorium errorum Satyrae Joannis Falkenberg O. P. Concilio Constanteinsi datum (1416-1417)
- Allegationes pro parte regis Polonie coram Sigismundo Imperatore (1420)
- Oculi (1420)
- Ad vivendum (1421)
- Letter to the Bishop of Kraków (1432)

== Critical editions of works ==
- Ludwik Ehrlich, Pisma wybrane Pawła Włodkowica / Works of Paul Wladimiri (A Selection) (3 vols., Warszawa: PAX, 1966-69). Latin edition, Polish and English translation.
- Stanisław Bełch, Paulus Vladimiri and His Doctrine Concerning International Law and Politics (2 vols., The Hague: Mouton, 1965), vol. II. Latin edition.

== See also ==
- Francisco de Vitoria
- List of Polish lawyers

== Sources ==
- Starodawne prawa Polskiego pomniki, vol. 5, part 1, ed. Michael Bobrzyński (1878), Academia litterarum Cracoviensis, including Włodkowic's Tractatus de potestate along with the Teutonic Knights' response, the Tractatus de ordine crucifero, and the Tractatus de annatis, along with a preface in Polish.
- http://original.britannica.com/eb/topic-646378/Pawel-Wlodkowic
- http://www.britannica.com/EBchecked/topic/646378/Pawel-Wlodkowic
- http://www.123exp-biographies.com/t/00034177042/
- https://web.archive.org/web/20080622093435/http://www.wzks.uj.edu.pl/epi/2004/lha11/zyciorys.html (in Polish)
- http://czasopisma.upjp2.edu.pl/thepersonandthechallenges/article/view/1653
