= Koninki =

- Village
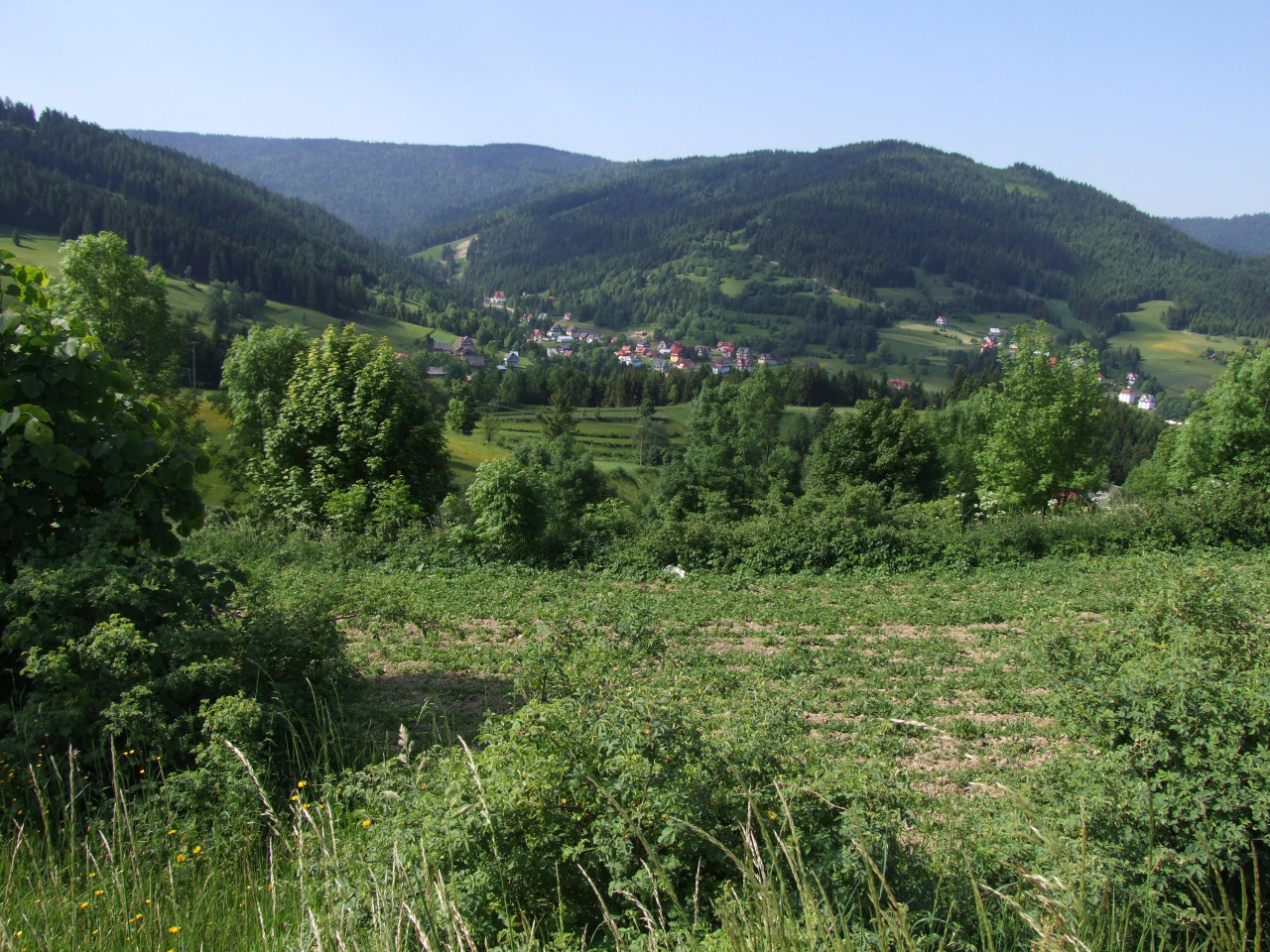

- Koninki on a map of Poland
- Coordinates: 49°36′N 20°03′E
- Country: Poland
- Voivodeship: Lesser Poland Voivodeship
- County: Limanowa County
- Gmina: Gmina Niedźwiedź
- Time zone: UTC+1 (CET)
  - Summer (DST): UTC+2 (CEST)
- Area code: (+48) 18
- Website: www.koninki.pl

Koninki is a settlement in the Lesser Poland Voivodeship, in southern Poland, situated at the south-east end of the so-called Poręba key. Administratively, it is part of village Poręba Wielka, Limanowa County. Koninki is a tourist centre on the border of the Gorczański National Park at the foot of the Tobołów mountain (957 m n.p.m.) fitted with a chairlift. The settlement is an excellent base for treks into the Gorce Mountains. A Koninka river flows through the settlement.

Two tourist trails lead from Koninki toward the Turbacz mountain (blue and green). In winter the ski lift is used mainly by skiers reaching the Tobołów slopes, the longest ski run in the Gorce Mountains. The base station of the ski-lift is situated in the former leisure centre of the Sendzimir Steelworks from Kraków.

Koninki's biggest vacation centre is called Ostoja Górska with 200 accommodations, the ski station, and the popular chairlift to the top of Tobołów mountain. In the centre of Koninki there is a small chapel which, according to legend, stopped a cholera epidemic.

In the 18th century the area, on which the centre is situated, called Hucisko, contained a glass factory.

== Notable individuals ==
- Polish writer Władysław Orkan, born in Poręba Wielka
