= Ochotnica Dolna =

- Village
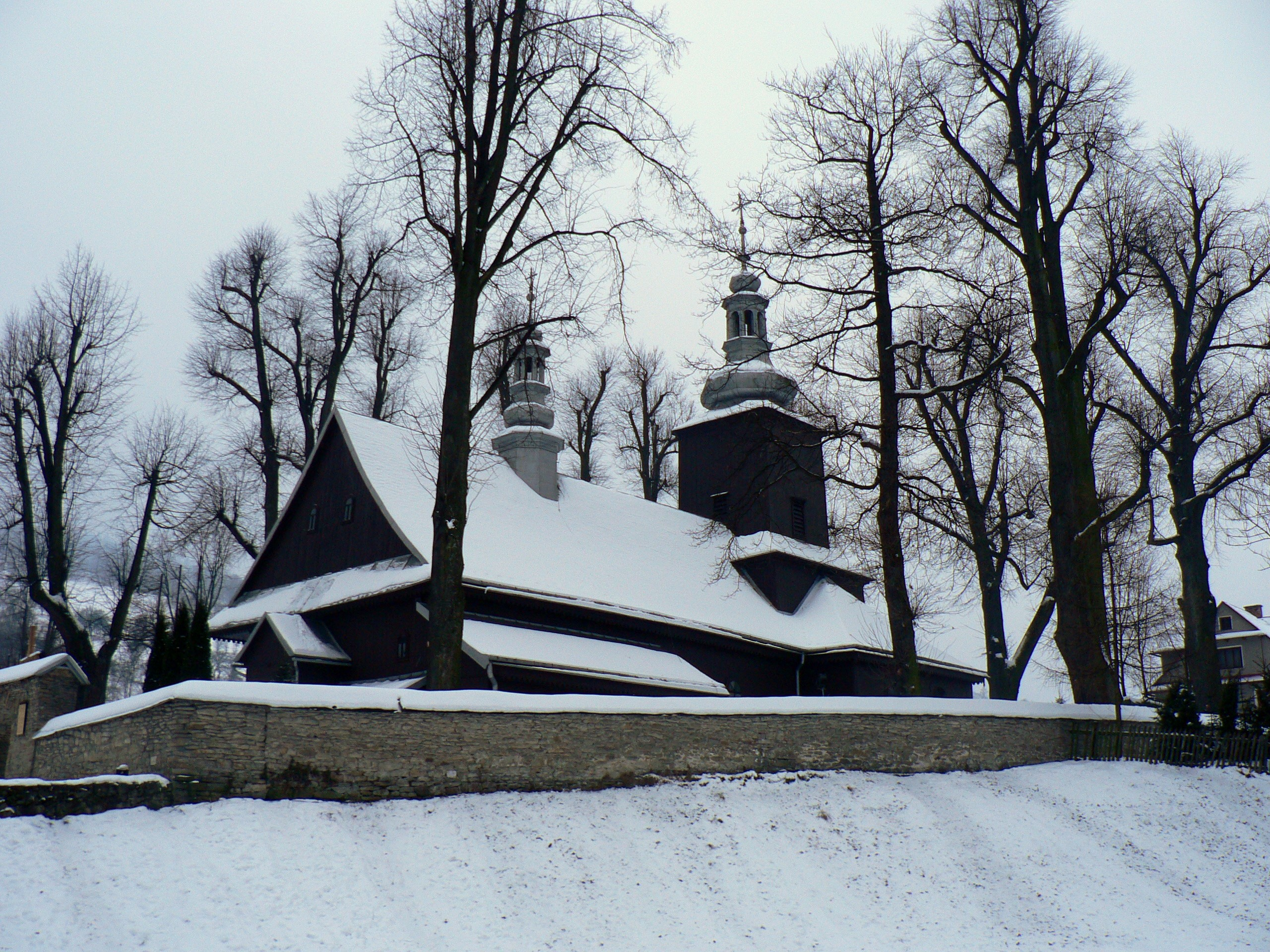
- Church

- Location within Poland
- Coordinates: 49°32′N 20°19′E
- Country: Poland
- Voivodeship: Lesser Poland
- County: Nowy Targ
- Gmina: Ochotnica Dolna
- Population: 2,100

Ochotnica Dolna [ɔxɔtˈnit͡sa ˈdɔlna] is a village in Nowy Targ County, Lesser Poland Voivodeship, in southern Poland. It is the seat of the gmina (administrative district) called Gmina Ochotnica Dolna.

The extended village has a population of 2,100. Along with Ochotnica Górna (split off in 1910), it forms one of the longest villages in Poland. Ochotnica is a recreational village and a winter sports destination located in the valley of Gorce Mountains beneath the Gorce National Park.

The village has been a site of a massacre of local Polish population by German Nazis in 1944.

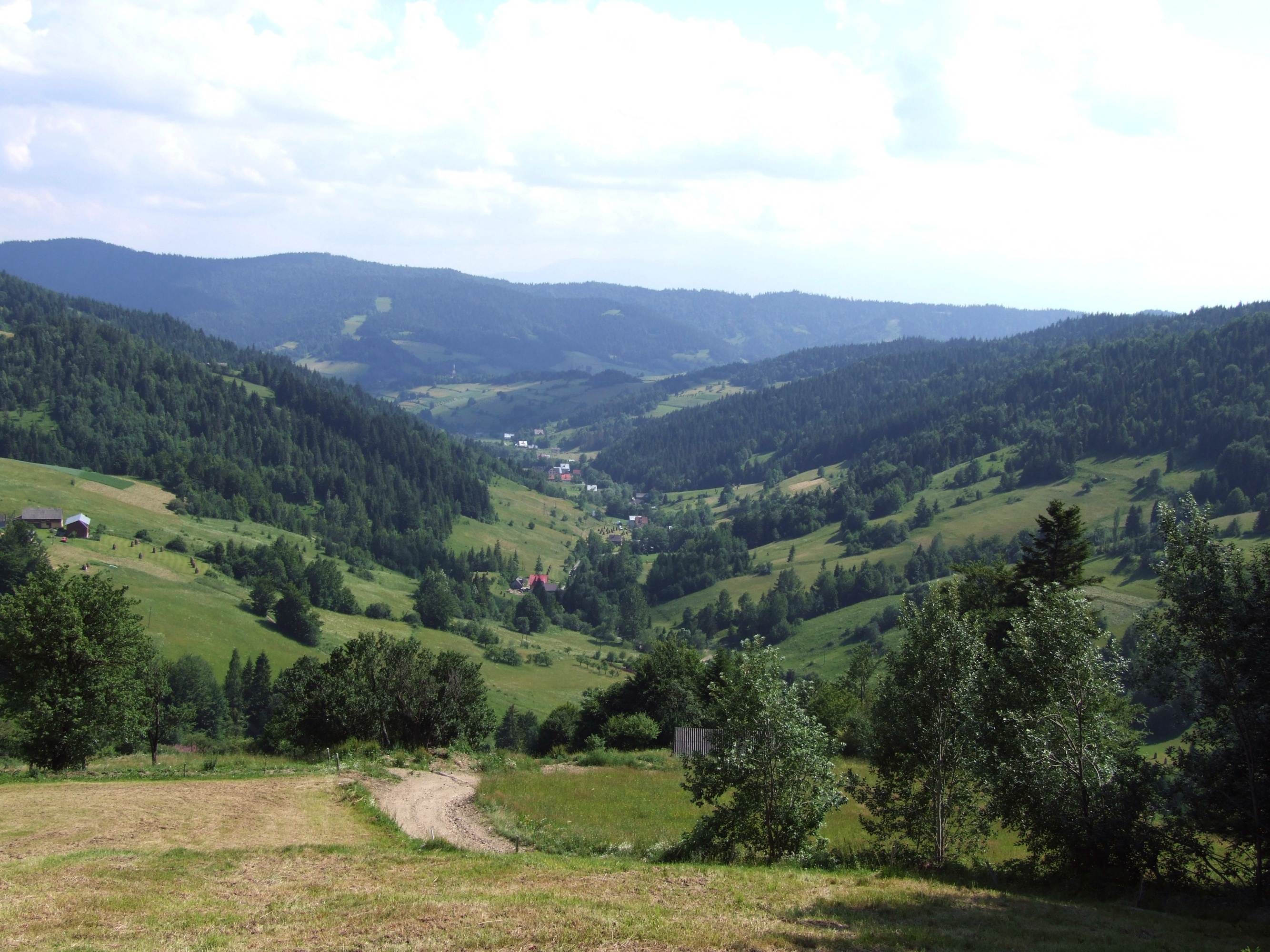
Potok Gorcowy river valley in Ochotnica Dolna
