= Szczawa, Lesser Poland Voivodeship =

Szczawa
- Village
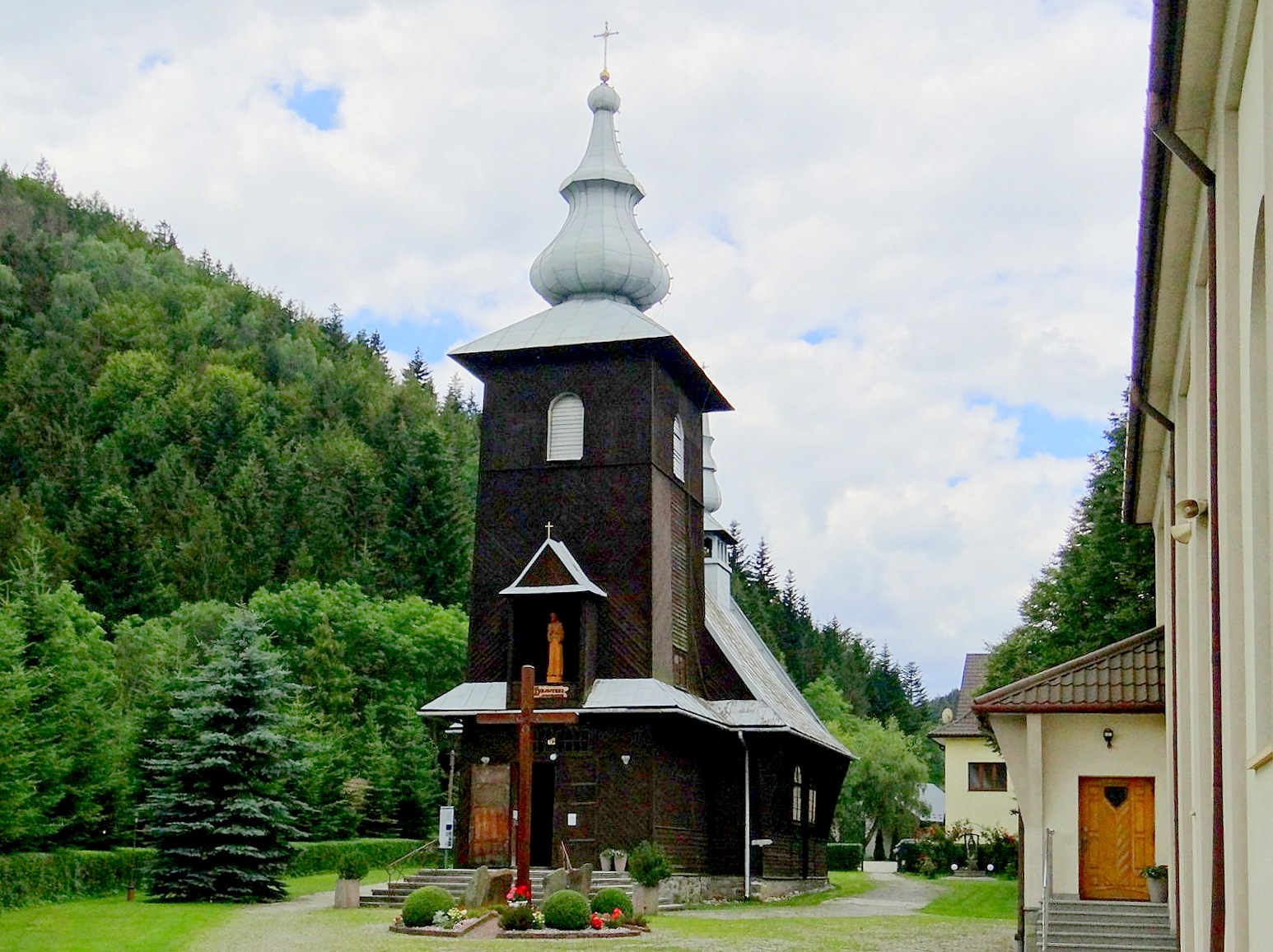
- Church of the Sacred Heart

- Location within Poland
- Coordinates: 49°36′25″N 20°17′51″E
- Country: Poland
- Voivodeship: Lesser Poland
- County: Limanowa
- Gmina: Szczawa
- Highest elevation: 1,008 m (3,307 ft)
- Lowest elevation: 530 m (1,740 ft)

Population
  - Total: 2,100
- Website: http://www.szczawa.prv.pl

Szczawa [ˈʂt͡ʂava] is a village in Lesser Poland Voivodeship, Poland, within Limanowa County. It is the seat of Gmina Szczawa.

Szczawa is a recreational village and winter sports destination located in the valley of Gorce Mountains beneath the Gorce National Park.

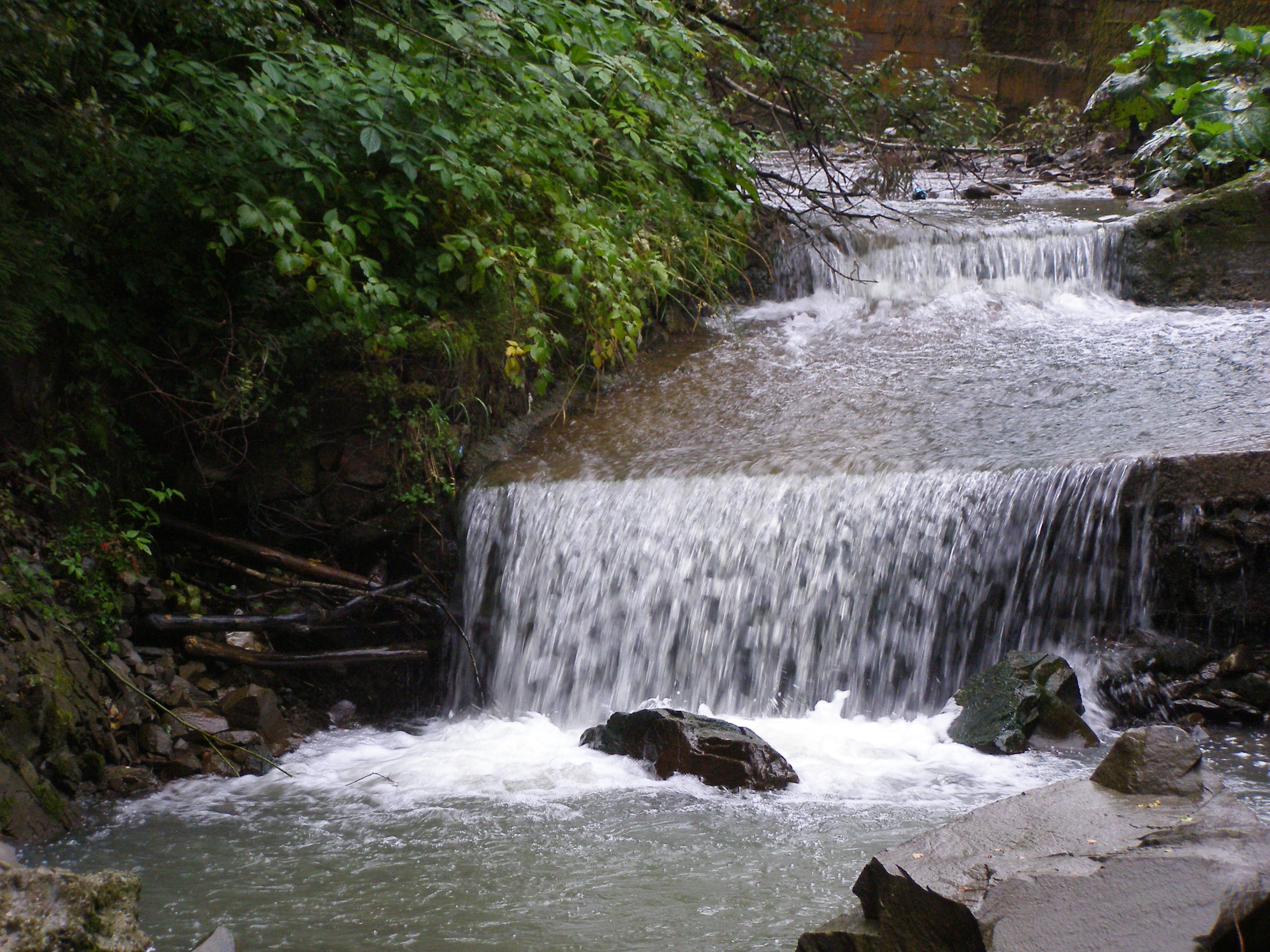
The Głębieniec river waterfall in Szczawa
