= Robert Andler Lipski =

Polish-British artist (born 1968)

Robert Andler-Lipski
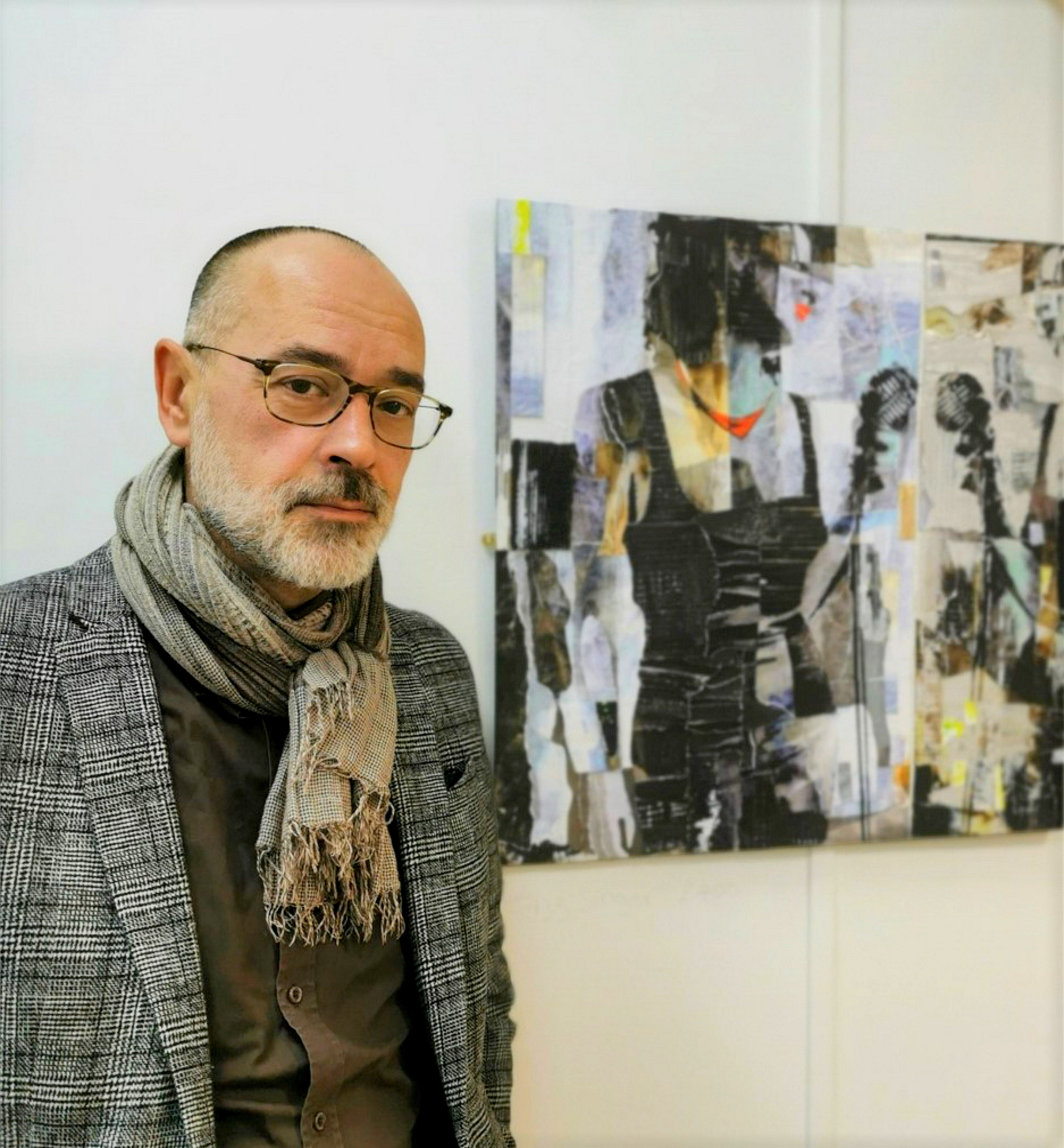
- Born: 1 April 1968 (age 58); Poland
- Known for: using a philosophical term of Stochastism in relation to the new approach to abstract presentation in contemporary art and using mixed printmaking techniques (MPT) in complex creative process of both painting and sculpting
- Movement: modern art, contemporary art, abstract

Robert Andler-Lipski (born 1 April 1968) is a Polish-British visual artist, printmaker, collagist, graphic artist, designer and sculptor.

He is working from a number of various and often mutually incompatible influences including contemporary Japanese painters, abstract sculptures, widely understood abstract-expressionism, impressionism and fauvism, but also brut-art and mannerism. He is specializing in mixed media, experimenting with a wide range of mediums and materials attaching typical painting routines, collage and assemblage methods with mixed printmaking techniques in both canvas and sculpting works. In his creative process he blends diversities, also figurative subjects with rough abstract forms as a complexity and apparent chaos simultaneously with a harmony and simplicity, developing his own distinctive artistic language.

His individual style is often characterized as a specific mixture of contemporary fauvism, abstract-expressionism and even mannerism. However, as he says: “(...) there is no any particular style that I could attach to or link with my creative work. Of course that I am periodically, more or less influenced by some particular tendencies or styles, also inspired by some artists. But fortunately this drift is in the same way natural as constantly changeable during my work".

He is known for Stochastic Abstract, a term which he used for the first time during his exhibition “Intuition-Stochastic Abstract” in 2015 to describe his very own approach to the contemporary painting. Stochastism – according to Robert Andler-Lipski - in visual art, is a type of an abstract reflection, intuitive and deeply elusive impressions generated during the creation process. It is characterized by the apparent randomness of the composition. It is multifaceted reflection of the artistic perception. It is a search for some consensus between deep layers of subconscious, which is constantly stimulated by the external incentives also by conscious actions of mind".

Robert Andler-Lipski was born 1 April 1968 in Ostrowiec Swietokrzyski, Poland. He grew up and spent mostly all his childhood and youth in the picturesque city of Rabka Zdroj situated in Gorce Mountains in the south of the country what influenced heartily his individualistic sensitivity and deeply humanistic frame of mind.

Studied Methodology of Arts Teaching and Philosophy (Jagiellonian University). Also completed Decorative Tapestry Weaving and Artistic Mosaic Design master courses. In parallel to his artistic activity, since 1990 he worked as a fine art teacher, as a journalist and editor. For many years he ran his own graphic studio specializing in signage and graphic design also cooperated with interior design industry. In 2013 he decided to devote himself exclusively to the artistic career.

His artworks are included in a number of institutional and private art collections in over 20 countries worldwide.

Living and working in England.

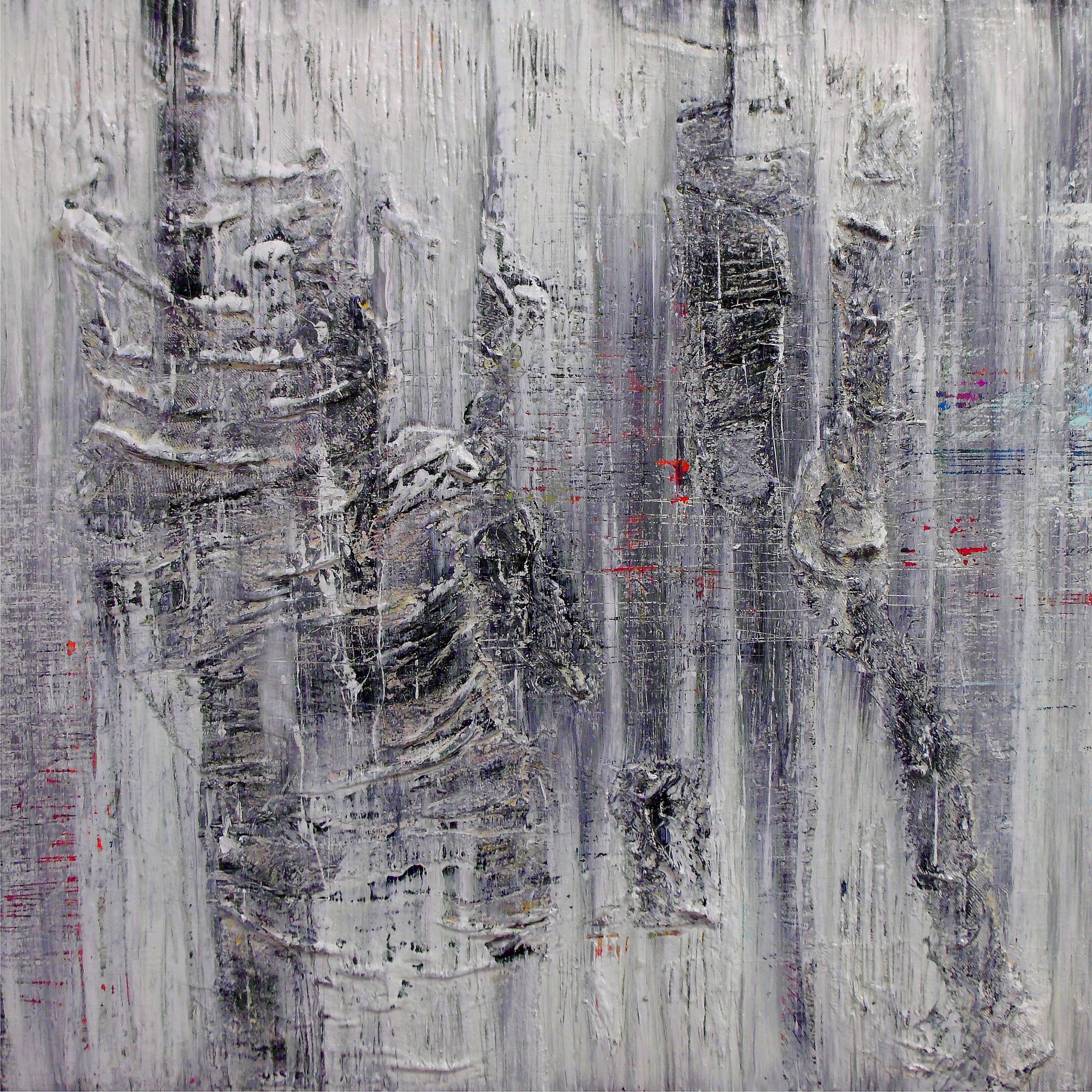
COINCIDENTALLY DISCOVERED IRREGULARITY IN VERBAL COMMUNICATION 2015. Mixed media on canvas. Private collection in Berlin, Germany

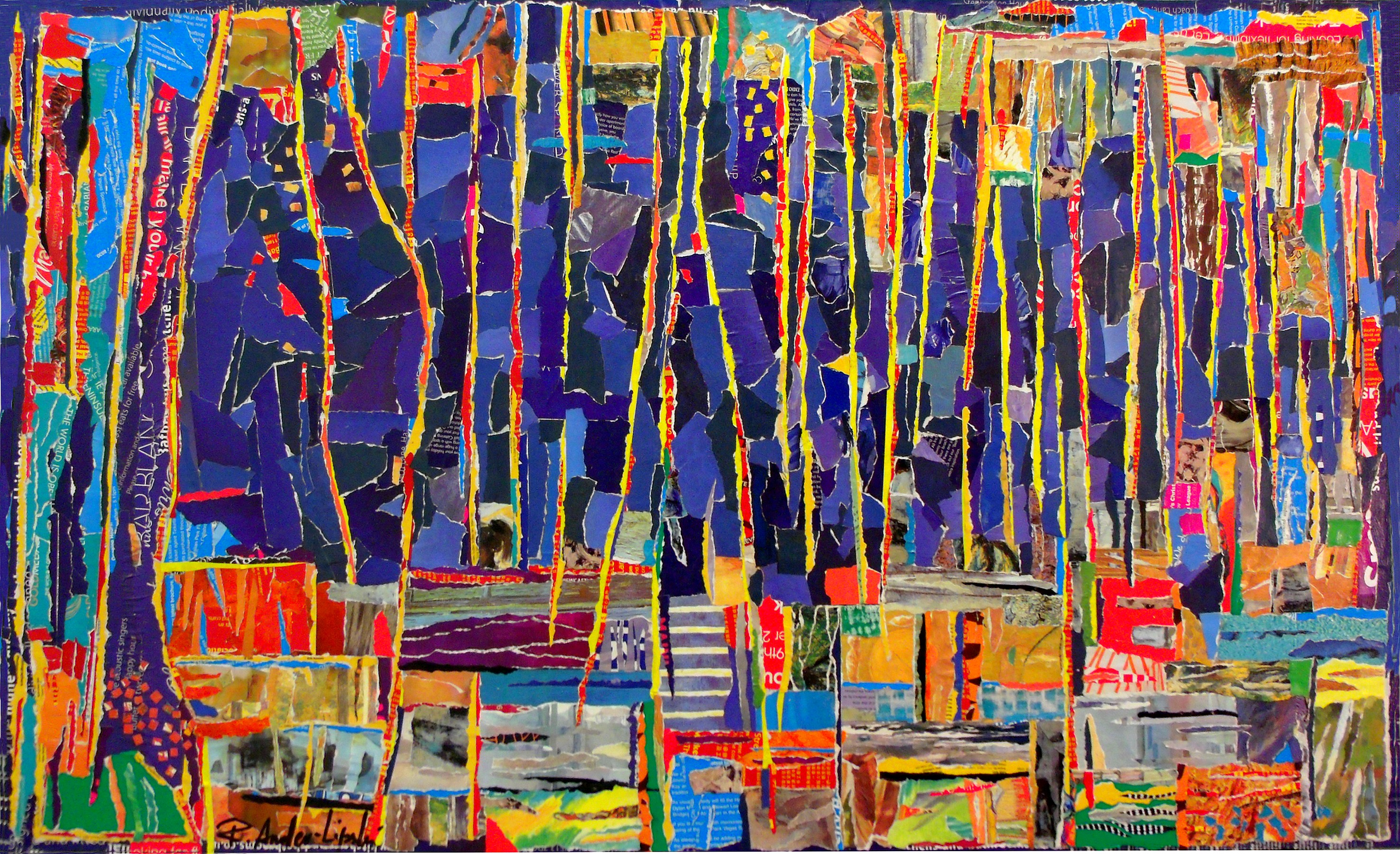
THE SOME PLACE I REMEMBER 2016. Collage on board. Private collection in Padova, Italy

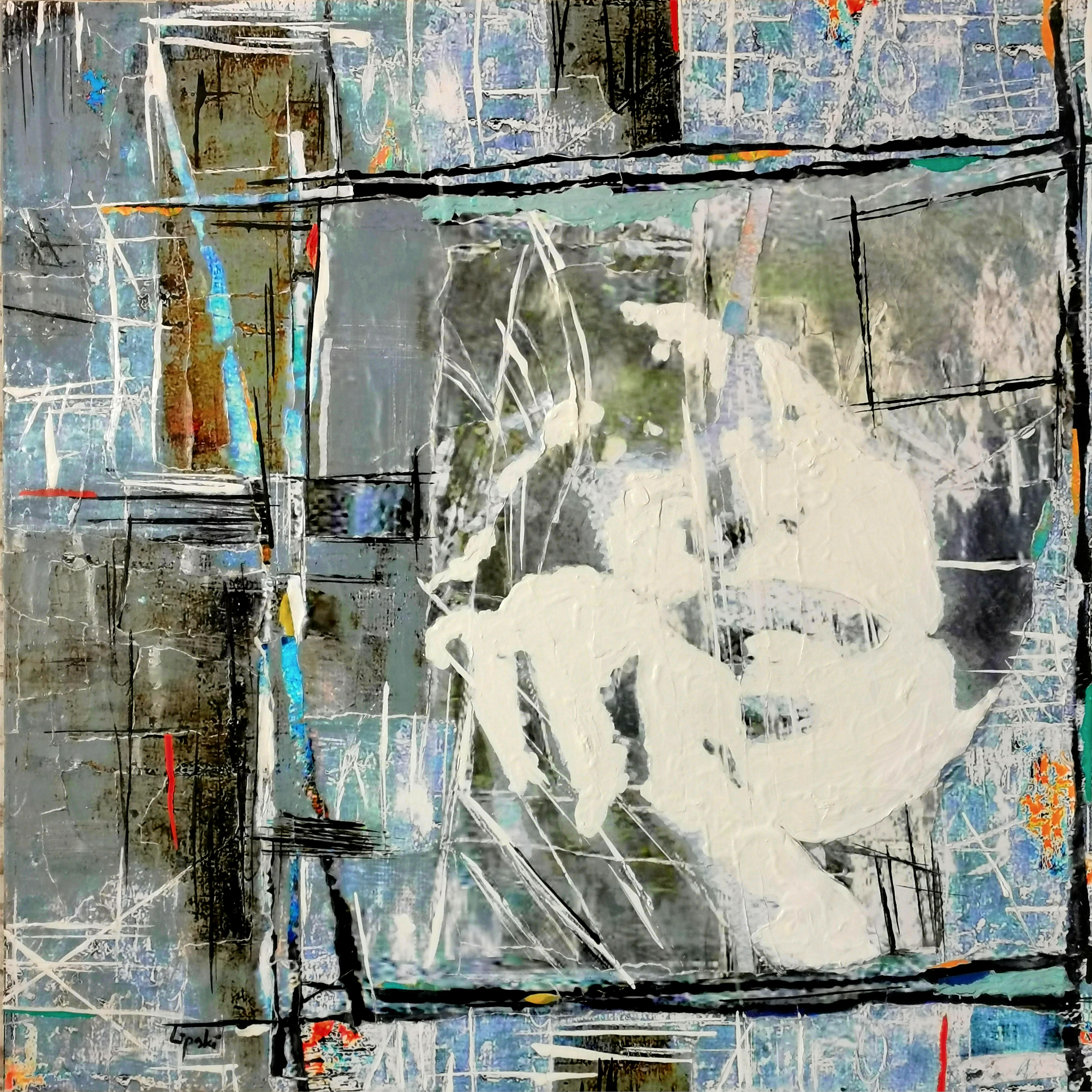
MIRROR, MIRROR ON THE WALL 2016. Mixed media and collage on canvas. Private collection in Italy

== Books and publications ==
“Woman On The Wind” (Poetry, 1995)

“Dead Face Of Tomorrow” (Poetry, 1999)

“The Nonsense Collector” (Poetry, 2005)

“Complicated Simplicity” (Art Catalog, 2015)

“Intuition. Stochastic Abstract” (Art Catalog, 2015)

“6 Abstract Souls” (Art Album, 2017)

“Mixed Printmaking Techniques” (Art Catalog, 2021)

== Recent exhibitions ==
2014 - The Brick Lane Gallery, London, UK – "Infatuation. Art In Mind" (international group exhibition)

2015 – Bede's World Museum, Jarrow, Newcastle upon Tyne, UK – "Complicated Simplicity" (individual exhibition)

2015 – The Customs House, South Shields, UK –-"Give a Heart" - StClare's Hospice (charity group exhibition)

2015 – The Blacksmiths Arms, Pittington, Durham, UK – Post show individual exhibition

2016 – Bede's World Museum, Jarrow, Newcastle upon Tyne, UK – "Intuition. Stochastic Abstract" (individual exhibition)

2016 – Marzia Frozen Galerie, Berlin, Germany – "Relativity" (group exhibition)

2016 – Varco Center, Rome, Italy – "CosmoGraphie" (multidisciplinary group exhibition)

2017 – Satura Art Gallery, Genoa, Italy - “Erotica Mente”(group exhibition)

2018 – ART Revolution Taipei 2018, Taipei World Trade Center, Taiwan (group exhibition)

2019 – ART Revolution Taipei 2019, Taipei World Trade Center, Taiwan (group exhibition)

2020 – Frederick Street Gallery, Sunderland, UK - “For Your Eyes Only” (individual exhibition)
