= Mount Suhora Observatory =

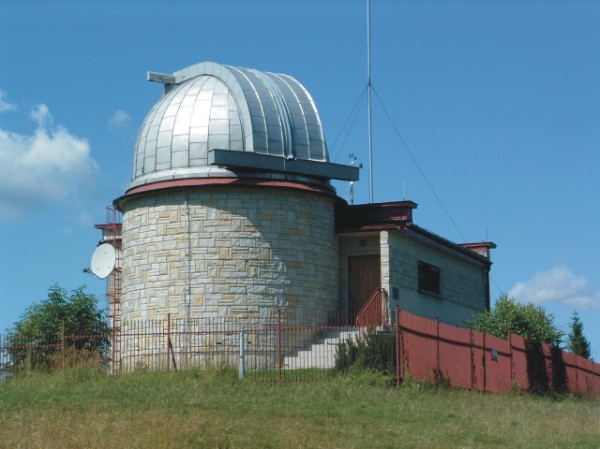
- View from south-east
- Organization: Cracow Pedagogical University
- Location: Mount Suhora, Gorce
- Coordinates: 49°34′9″N 20°4′3″E
- Altitude: 1,009 m (3,310 ft)
- Established: 1987
- Website: Official website (in English)

Telescopes
- telescope: 0.6m Cassegrain reflector
- Related media on Commons

The Mount Suhora Observatory (Polish: Obserwatorium astronomiczne na Suhorze) is an astronomical observatory owned and operated by the Astronomy department of the Pedagogical University of Cracow. It is located on Mount Suhora in the Gorce Mountains within the Gorce National Park, 50 km south of Kraków.

== History ==
Founded on November 5, 1987, Mt. Suhora Observatory serves a dual purpose. It is meant as a place of learning for students of the University's Astronomy department from Kraków as well as the research-work facility. The observatory has one 0.6 metre Cassegrain telescope along with a photometer and a CCD camera.

== Gallery ==
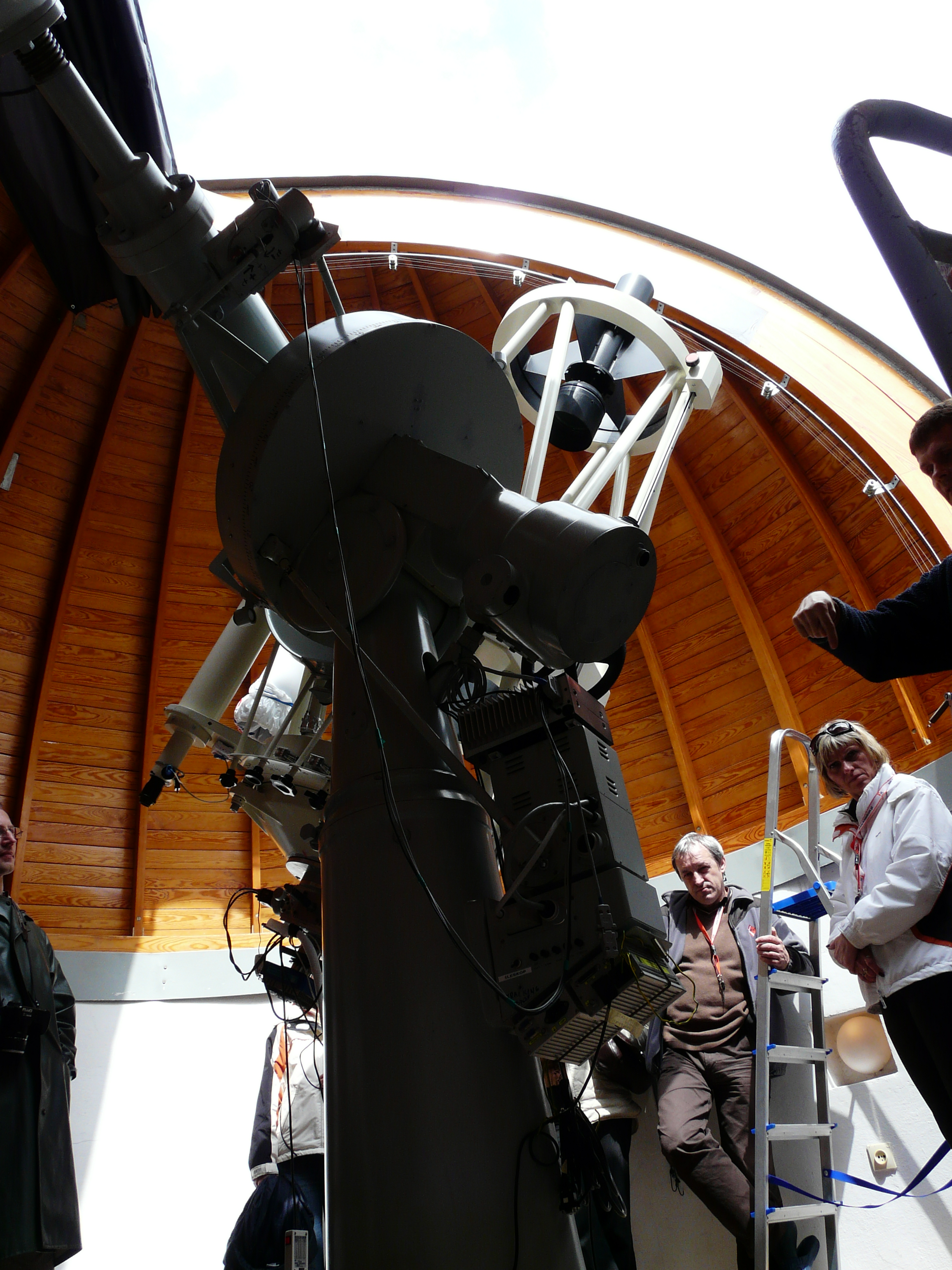
Telescope

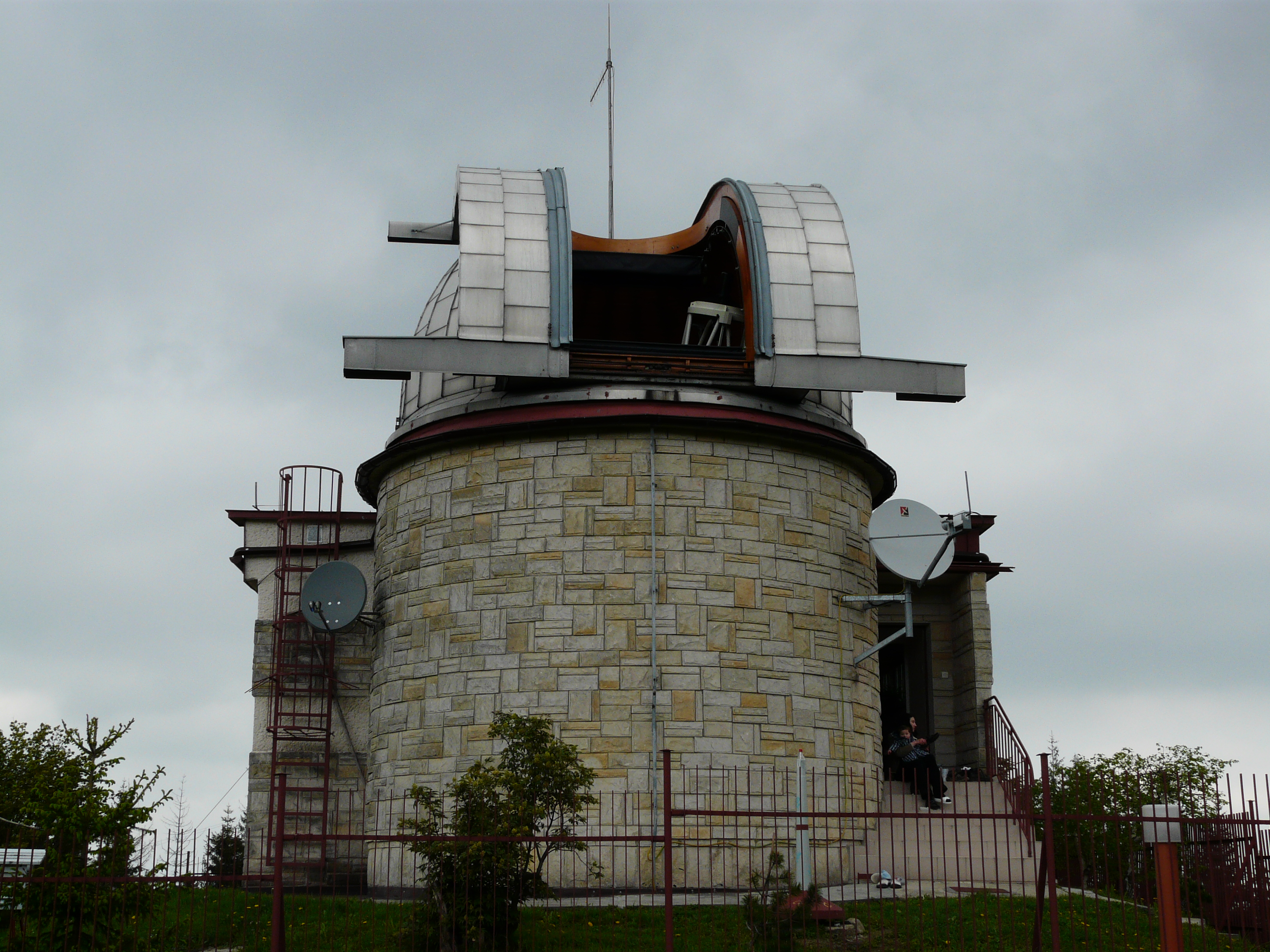
General view
