= Turbacz =

Highest peak of the Gorce Mountains, Poland

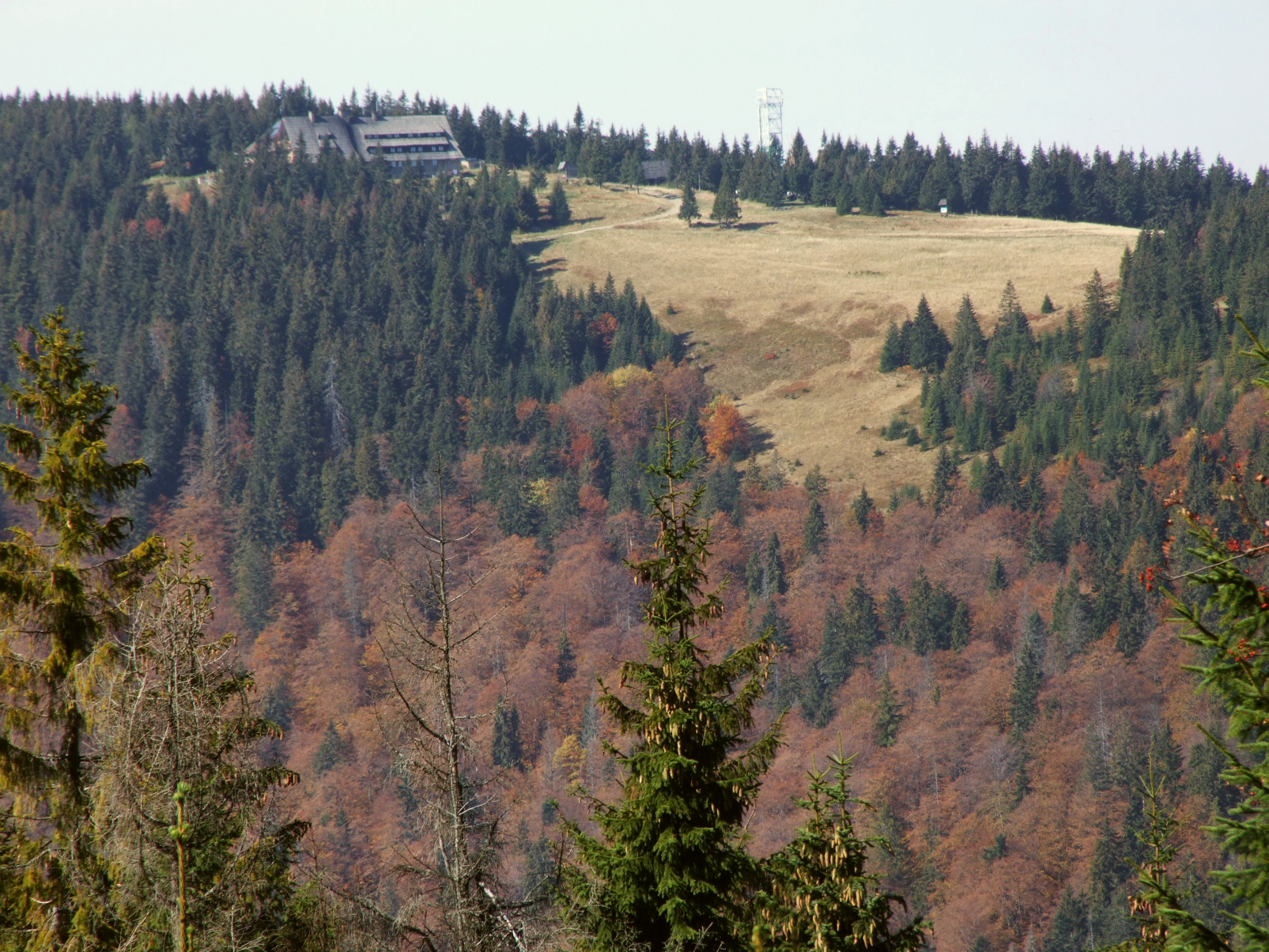
- A view of Turbacz, together with the shelter

Highest point
- Elevation: 1,310 m (4,300 ft)
- Coordinates: 49°32′34″N 20°06′14″E

Geography
- Location within Lesser Poland Voivodeship Location within Poland
- Location: Poland
- Parent range: Gorce Mountains

Turbacz is the highest peak of the Gorce Mountains, a mountain range located in southern Lesser Poland. It lies in the middle of the range, and according to most sources, it is 1310 meters high. The peak itself is surrounded by dense pine forest, which makes it impossible view the surrounding area. In the past, however, no trees were present there, and according to the 1832 sources, it was possible to see the city of Kraków with a telescope. On the top there is a stone obelisk with an iron cross. Turbacz belongs to the Crown of Polish Mountains.

Turbacz is popular among tourists, with a junction of several trails located in front of a local PTTK shelter. The shelter itself, located at the height of 1283 meters, provides views of the Tatras and the Pieniny mountains. Turbacz shelter is a large stone building, with two wings. It was opened in 1958, and has 100 beds. Next to the shelter there is a PTTK Museum of Mountain Culture and Tourism, opened in 1980.

Every second Sunday of August a Celebration of Mountains takes place next to the so-called Papal Chapel, on the Wisielakowka clearing. It attracts a number of tourists, and in the same spot, a traditional mass was led by Józef Tischner. On August 12, 2012, a monument dedicated to Polish soldiers was opened on the Wisielakówka clearing. Every summer, a mountain bike race takes place from Rabka Zdrój to Turbacz and back.

During World War II and in the second half of the 1940s, numerous anti-Nazi and anti-Soviet partisan units operated in the area of Turbacz. One personality closely associated with the peak is Józef Kuraś, nom de guerre Ogień, a controversial Polish cursed soldier, who fought both Nazi and Soviet occupiers.

In the past, the mountain was known by local people as Kluczki. In 1790, Habsburg cartographers, working on the map of Galicia, made a mistake, placing the village of Niedzwiedz in the location of the peak, which resulted in naming confusion throughout the 19th century. The word Turbacz itself probably is of Wallachian origin, coming from the Romanian word turbă, which means "peat".

The summit of Turbacz has a subarctic climate (Köppen Dfc) due to its elevation. The average temperatures are comparable with those found in places in far Northern Europe, such as Alta in Norway, however, the high annual precipitation in combination with the low temperatures places it firmly within the Subalpine Rainforest zone according to Holdridge.

Climate data for Turbacz, Poland (1310 m)
Month	Jan	Feb	Mar	Apr	May	Jun	Jul	Aug	Sep	Oct	Nov	Dec	Year
Mean daily maximum °C (°F)	−4.0 (24.8)	−2.0 (28.4)	0.5 (32.9)	6.5 (43.7)	13.5 (56.3)	16.0 (60.8)	18.0 (64.4)	17.5 (63.5)	12.0 (53.6)	7.5 (45.5)	1.5 (34.7)	−2.0 (28.4)	7.1 (44.8)
Daily mean °C (°F)	−7.1 (19.2)	−5.3 (22.5)	−2.5 (27.5)	2.6 (36.7)	7.8 (46.0)	10.7 (51.3)	12.2 (54.0)	12.1 (53.8)	8.0 (46.4)	3.7 (38.7)	−2.0 (28.4)	−5.5 (22.1)	2.9 (37.2)
Mean daily minimum °C (°F)	−10.5 (13.1)	−9.0 (15.8)	−6.0 (21.2)	−2.0 (28.4)	2.5 (36.5)	5.5 (41.9)	6.5 (43.7)	6.5 (43.7)	3.5 (38.3)	0.0 (32.0)	−5.5 (22.1)	−9.0 (15.8)	−1.5 (29.3)
Average precipitation mm (inches)	78 (3.1)	74 (2.9)	83 (3.3)	109 (4.3)	142 (5.6)	181 (7.1)	206 (8.1)	163 (6.4)	132 (5.2)	101 (4.0)	87 (3.4)	79 (3.1)	1,435 (56.5)
Mean monthly sunshine hours	84	95	115	135	177	161	167	148	127	123	83	70	1,485
Source: IMGW

== See also ==
- Gorce National Park
- Podhale
