= Tylmanowa =

- Village
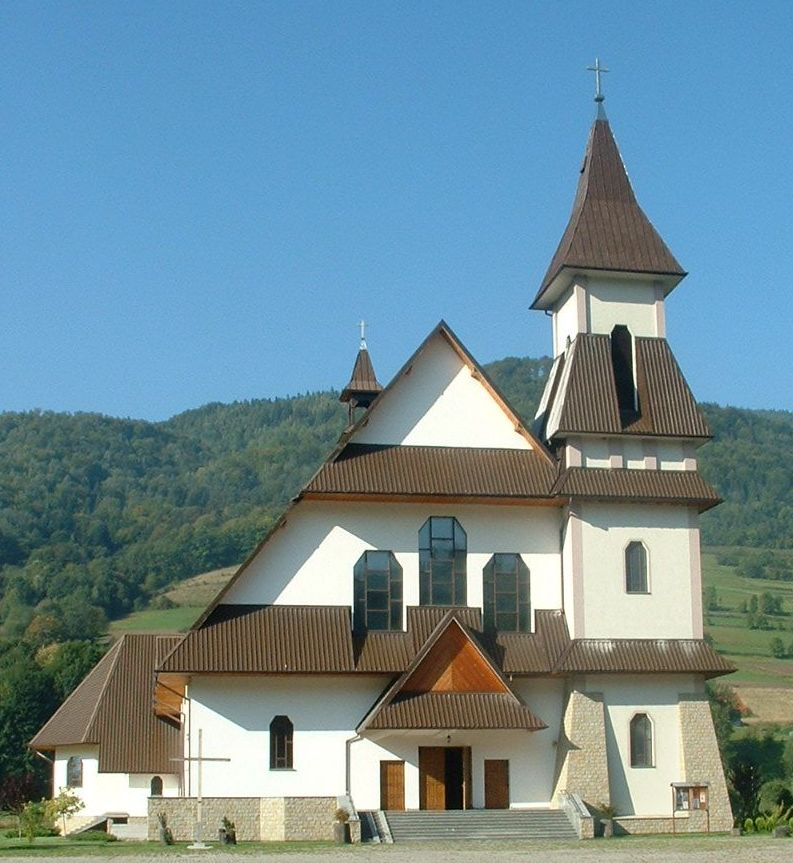
- Church of the Divine Mercy

- Location within Poland
- Coordinates: 49°31′N 20°25′E
- Country: Poland
- Voivodeship: Lesser Poland
- County: Nowy Targ
- Gmina: Ochotnica Dolna
- Population: 2,600

Tylmanowa [tɨlmaˈnɔva] is a village in the administrative district of Gmina Ochotnica Dolna, within Nowy Targ County, Lesser Poland Voivodeship, in southern Poland. The population of Tylmanowa is 2,600.

Tylmanowa is located in the Gorce Mountains, near the confluence of Ochotnica and Dunajec rivers, north of Krościenko nad Dunajcem, and south-east of Gorce National Park. Mentioned already in the chronicles of Jan Długosz (1415 – 1480), Tylmanowa was founded in 1336 by Piotr (Petrus) Tylman, as a stopover on the trade route to Spiš and the Kingdom of Hungary. Notable points of interest include Neoclassical manor from 1840 and a wooden church from 1756, as well as the nearby landscape park called Kłodne nad Dunajcem (89,1 ha) leading to World Heritage Site, Dunajec River Gorge.

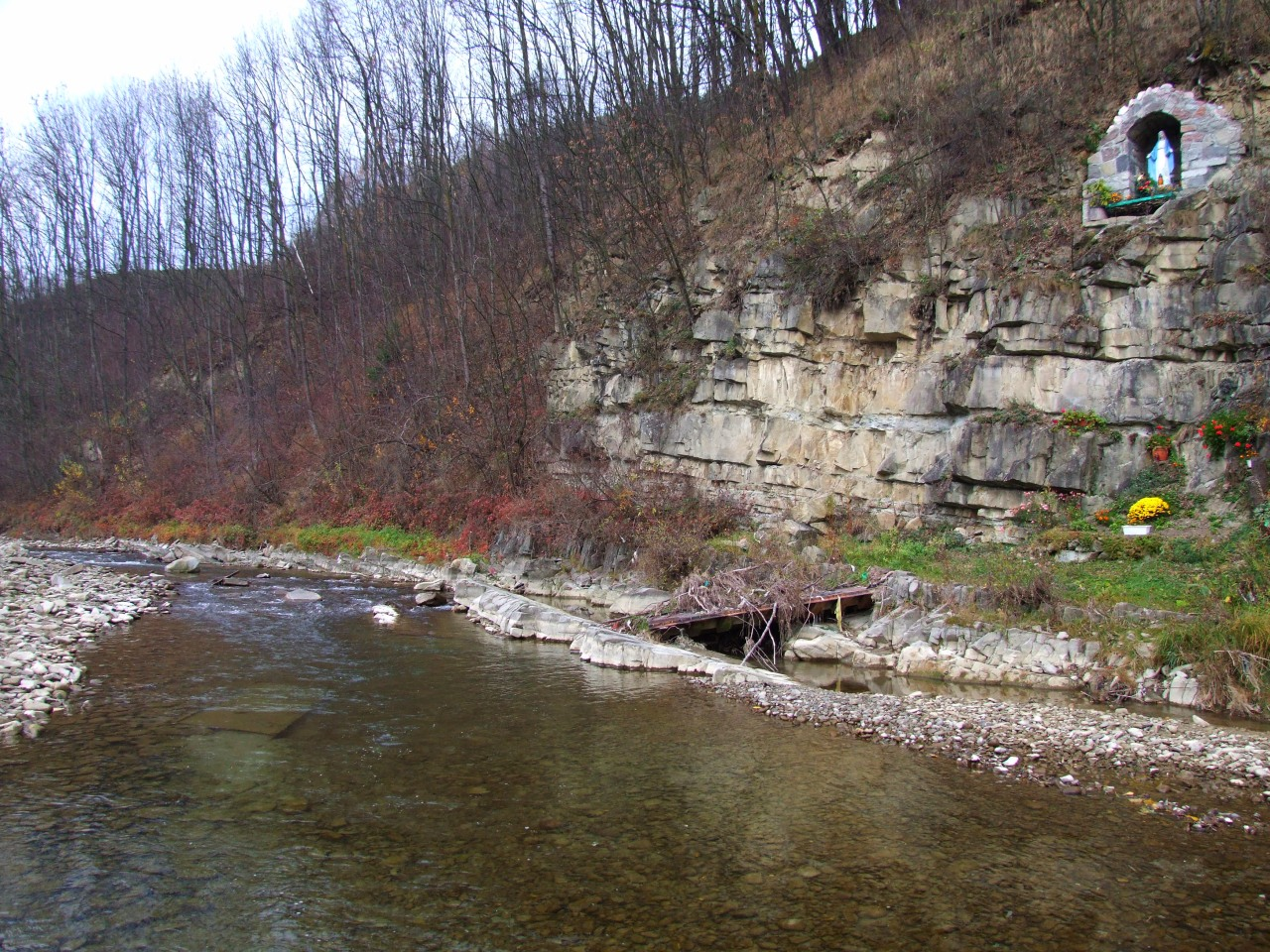
Ochotnica river, north-west of Tylmanowa
