= Gmina Szczawa =

- Rural municipality
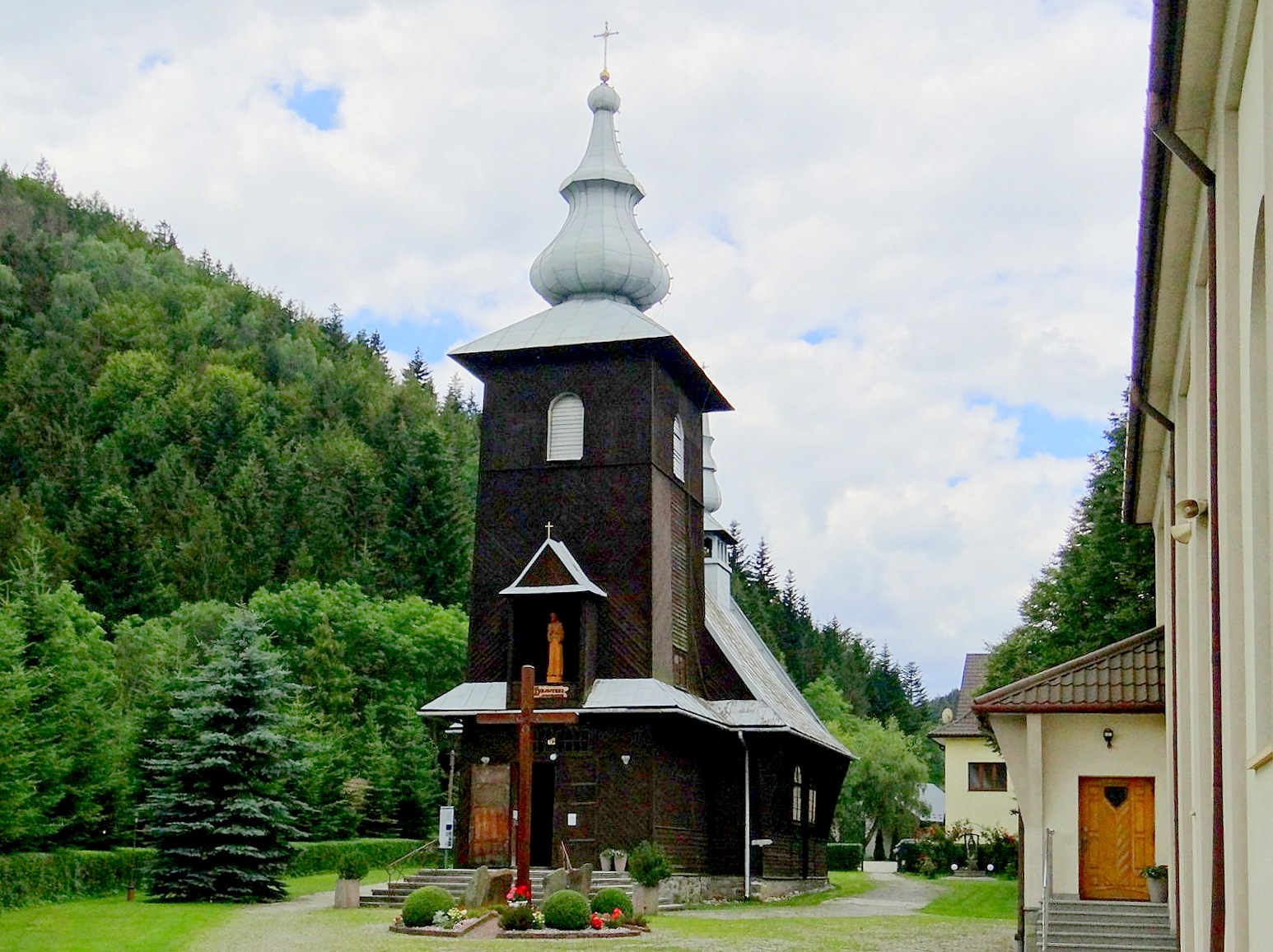
- The Church of the Sacred Heart of Jesus in Szczawa.
- Interactive map of Gmina Szczawa
- Coordinates: 49°36′30″N 20°17′46″E
- Country: Poland
- Voivodeship: Lesser Poland
- County: Limanowa
- Established: 1 January 2025
- Seat: Szczawa

Area
  - Total: 43.3853 km^{2} (16.7512 sq mi)

Population (2025)
  - Total: 1,830
  - Density: 42.2/km^{2} (109/sq mi)
- Car plates: KLI

Gmina Szczawa (Polish: [ˈʂt͡ʂa.va]) is a rural municipality in Lesser Poland Voivodeship, Poland, located within the Limanowa County, between mountain ranges of Gorce and Island Beskids. Its seat of government is in the village of Szczawa, which is its only locality. The municipality has an area of 42.39 km^{2}, and as of 2025, has the population of 1830 people.

== History ==
The local population postulated for the creation of their own municipality since 2008, together with their efforts for Szczawa to receive the legal status of a spa town. On 28 July 2015, the Sejm of Poland passed a resolution, which envisioned its creation on 1 January 2016, from the territory of the municipality of Kamienica. However, it was cancelled with a resolution of the Council of Ministers from 28 December 2015. On 1 June 2017, the Constitutional Tribunal declared that such action was against the constitution and the law of municipal governance. The idea to create the municipality was brought back in 2024, with the Council of Ministers approving it on 1 October. It was founded on 1 January 2025.
