= Bloody Christmas Eve in Ochotnica Dolna =

Coordinates: 49.53°N 20.32°E

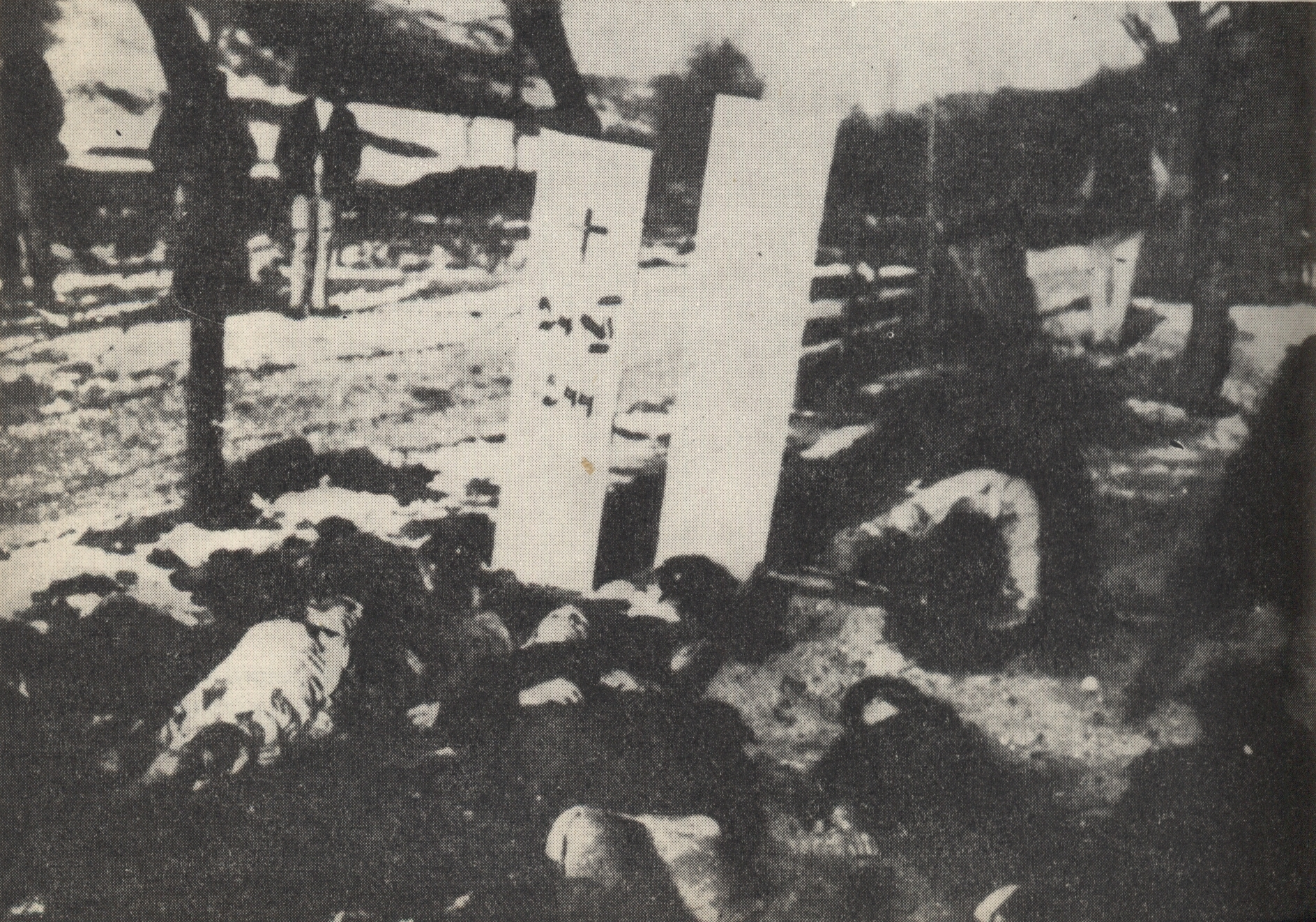
The victims of the Bloody Christmas Eve

Bloody Christmas Eve in Ochotnica Dolna – symbolic name given to the pacification of the Ochotnica Dolna village (currently Lesser Poland voivodeship, Nowy Targ County), made by German Occupiers in the last months of World War II. 23 December 1944 members of SS murdered 56 residents of Ochotnica Dolna and partially burnt the village. The name "Bloody Christmas Eve" refers to Eve of the Christmas, that previously was celebrated on 23 December.

== The course of pacification ==
On December 22, 1944, Germans arrived in Ochotnica Dolna, who within the so-called the food campaign robbed the village. Despite the opposition of the local residents, a group of Soviet partisans attacked German soldiers, killing two of them, including non - commissioned SS-Unterscharführer Bruno Koch.

The next day, about 200 SS men came from Krościenko with six cars. The Germans ran into the homes, demanding money first and then murdering people. Children were thrown alive in the fire or brutally murdered.

The Germans wanted to burn and plunge the next village Ochotnica Górna, but the snow was too heavy and their cars were not able to travel up the hill.

== Executioners ==
The crime in Ochotnica Dolna was made on December 23 by the SS (SS-Kampfgruppe Jagdkommando Matingen) criminal special order under the command of SS-Untersturmführer der Waffen-SS Albrecht C. Matingen (number SS 338 969). This division consisted of soldiers of various nationalities. It was created in mid-1944 by members of the Waffen-SS and police in Montelupich prison in Krakow. Most of them were SS men from the 3rd SS Panzer Division Totenkopf and the 4th SS Polizei Panzergrenadier Division. The company was stationed from the autumn of 1944 at the school in Krościenko.

Albrecht C. Matingen (born June 3, 1920, died October 23, 1974) lived in West Germany after the war. Neither he nor any of his unit members was ever convicted of crimes committed in Poland.

== Victims ==
According to the list of deaths registered by the Civil Registry Office (Parish Office) in Ochotnica Dolna on December 23, 1944, 56 people were murdered, including 19 children, 21 women. In almost two hours, almost all members of the families of Chlipałów, Rusnaków, Brzeźne and Karczewski were murdered. A fire station, a folk house and 32 farms burned down .

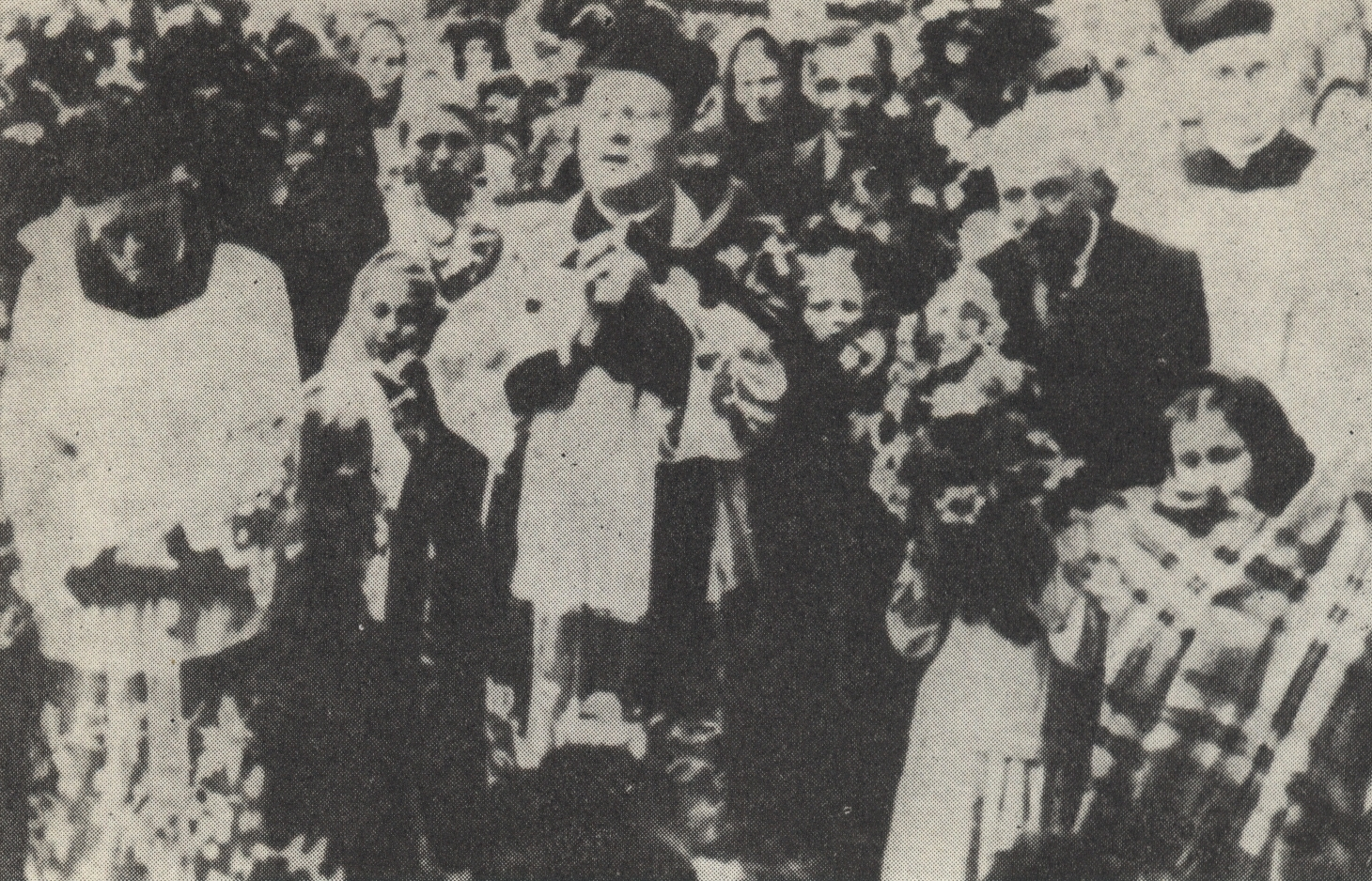
The funeral of the victims of Bloody Christmas Eve

The pacification of Ochotnica was one of the bloodiest German repressive actions in Podhale.

== Memory ==
The martyrdom of the village was commemorated by the memorial designed by Henryk Burzec, erected in 1964 in the center of Ochotnica Dolna, showing 20-year old Maria Kawalec, who is holding her small child next to her chest. After shooting her husband, Maria jumped out of the window with her daughter Anna in her arms. The first bullet hit the child in the forehead and the other pierced the mother's shovel and jaw. Maria sat under the willow tree and not letting go of the child, she froze in this position. You can see she was trying to protect the child from the bullets holding her hand up in the air.

The commemorative cross dedicated to these events also stood, among other crosses, at the Sanctuary of the Martyrdom of the Polish Countryside located in Michniów, where one of the largest pacification of villages in Polish territories during the occupation took place.
