= Kukuczka =

Kukuczka is a Polish surname. Notable people with the surname include:

- Czesław Kukuczka (1935–1974), Polish defector killed at the Berlin Wall
- Jerzy Kukuczka (1948–1989), Polish mountain climber
