= Gmina Kamienica =

Gmina Kamienica Kamienica Commune
- Gmina
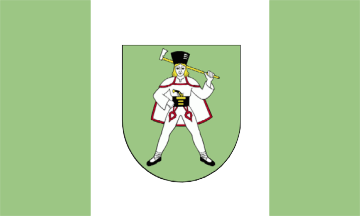
- Flag Coat of arms
- Interactive map of Gmina Kamienica
- Coordinates (Kamienica): 49°34′24″N 20°20′46″E
- Country: Poland
- Voivodeship: Lesser Poland
- County: Limanowa
- Seat: Kamienica

Area
  - Total: 52.8 km^{2} (20.4 sq mi)

Population (2023)
  - Total: 5,988
  - Density: 113/km^{2} (294/sq mi)
- Website: http://www.kamienica.iap.pl/

Gmina Kamienica is a rural gmina (administrative district) in Limanowa County, Lesser Poland Voivodeship, in southern Poland. Its seat is the village of Kamienica, which lies approximately 16 kilometres (10 mi) south of Limanowa and 62 km (39 mi) south-east of the regional capital Kraków.

The gmina covers an area of 52.8 square kilometres (20.4 sq mi), and as of 2025 its total population is 5988.

== Villages ==
Gmina Kamienica contains the villages and settlements of Kamienica, Zalesie, Zasadne and Zbludza.

== Neighbouring gminas ==
Gmina Kamienica is bordered by the gminas of Szczawa, Łącko, Łukowica, Ochotnica Dolna and Słopnice.
