= Zbludza =

- Village
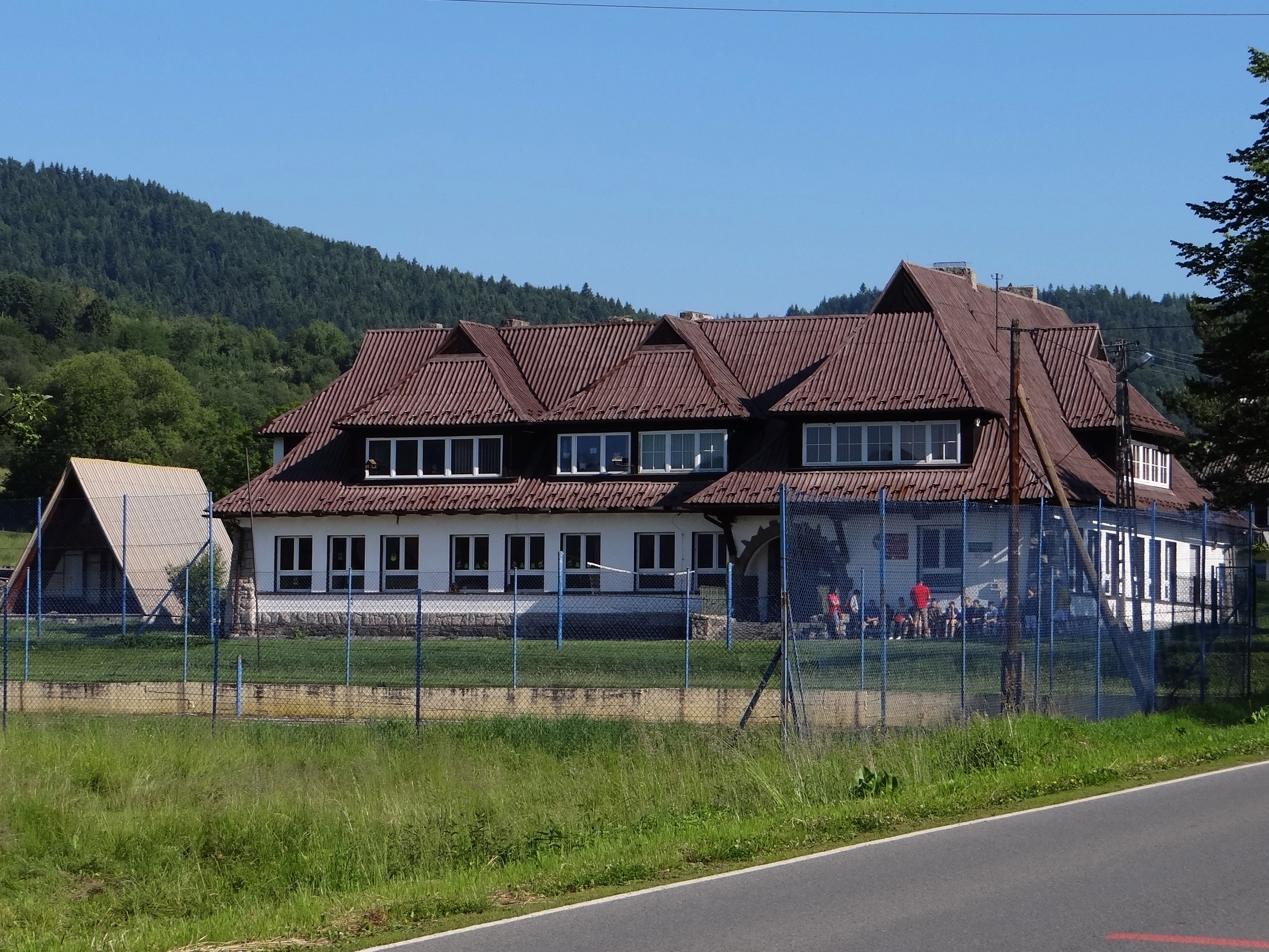
- School

- Location within Poland
- Coordinates: 49°35′38″N 20°20′59″E
- Country: Poland
- Voivodeship: Lesser Poland
- County: Limanowa
- Gmina: Kamienica
- Population (approx.): 600

Zbludza [ˈzblud͡za] is a village in the administrative district of Gmina Kamienica, within Limanowa County, Lesser Poland Voivodeship, in southern Poland.

The village has an approximate population of 600.
