= Zalesie, Limanowa County =

Zalesie
- Village
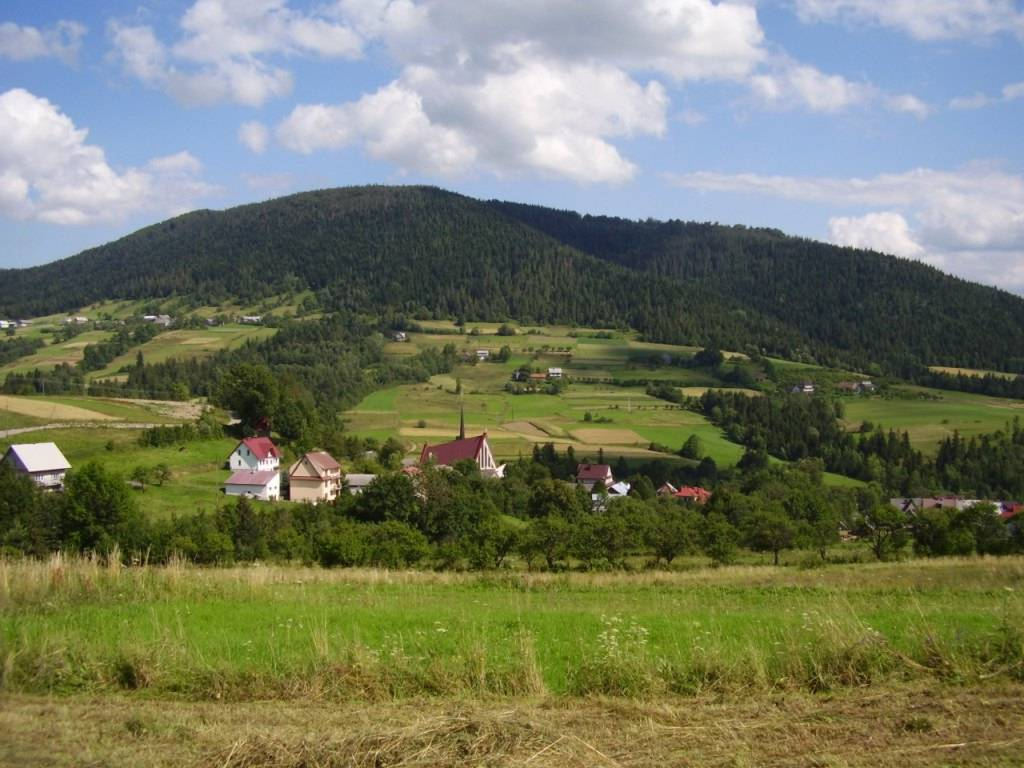
- Zalesie

- Location within Poland
- Coordinates: 49°37′23″N 20°20′49″E
- Country: Poland
- Voivodeship: Lesser Poland
- County: Limanowa
- Gmina: Kamienica
- Highest elevation: 1,029 m (3,376 ft)
- Lowest elevation: 650 m (2,130 ft)
- Population: 947
- Website: http://mojezalesie.republika.pl/

Zalesie [zaˈlɛɕɛ] is a village in the administrative district of Gmina Kamienica, within Limanowa County, Lesser Poland Voivodeship, in southern Poland.
