= Zasadne =

- Village
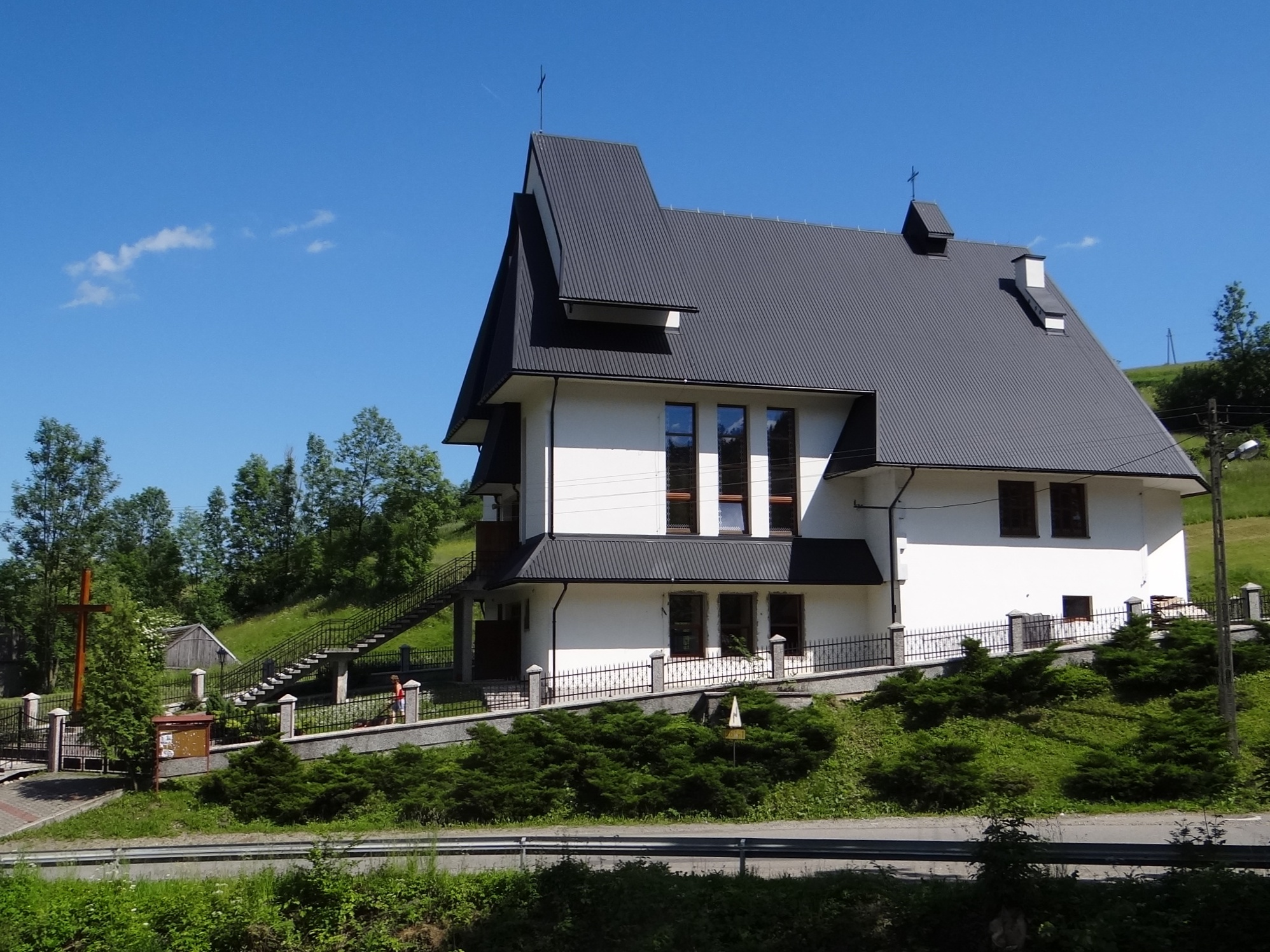
- Church

- Location within Poland
- Coordinates: 49°36′N 20°20′E
- Country: Poland
- Voivodeship: Lesser Poland
- County: Limanowa
- Gmina: Kamienica

Zasadne [zaˈsadnɛ] is a village in the administrative district of Gmina Kamienica, within Limanowa County, Lesser Poland Voivodeship, in southern Poland.
