= Młynne, Nowy Targ County =

Młynne
- Village
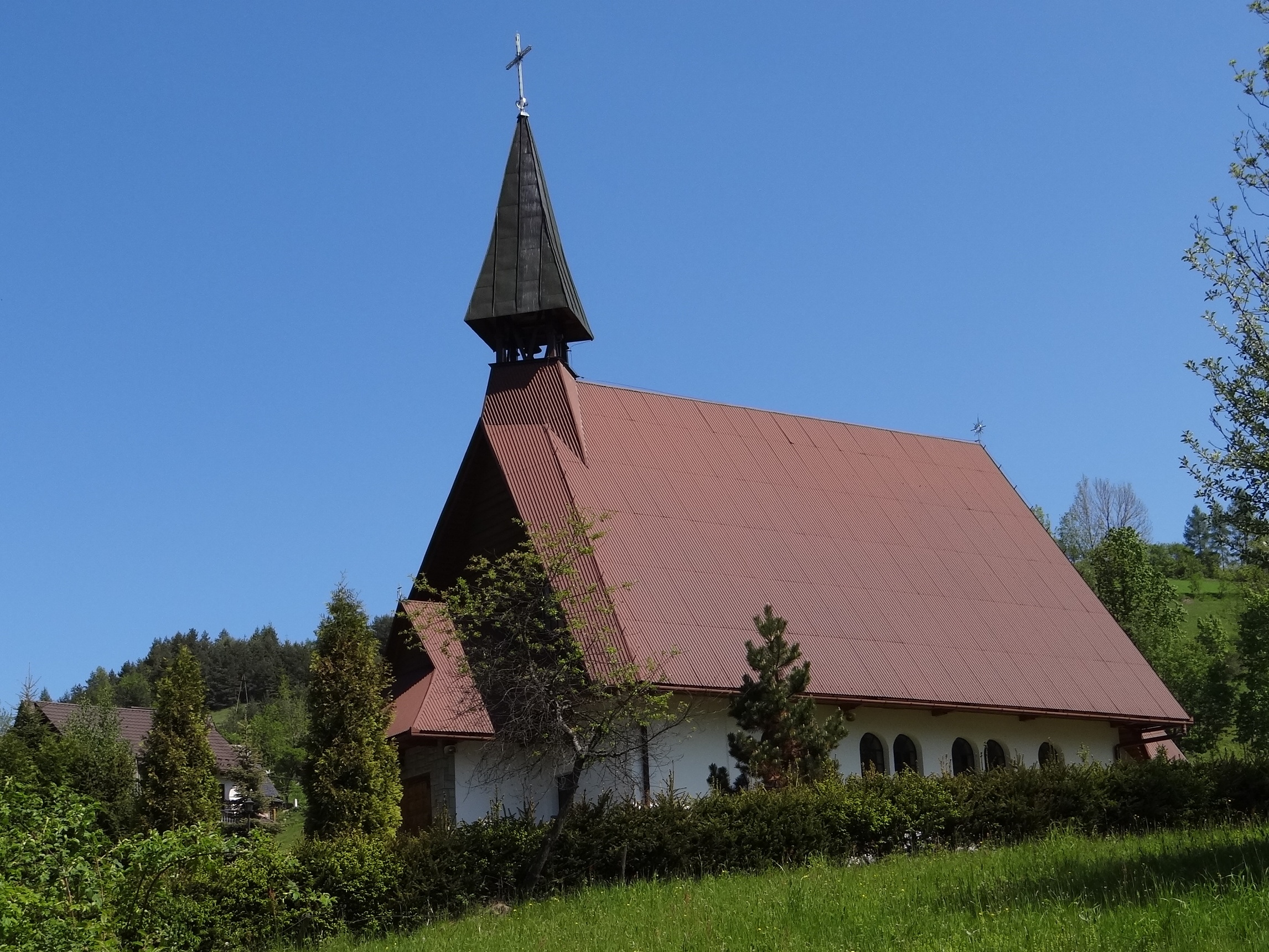
- Chapel

- Location within Poland
- Coordinates: 49°32′49″N 20°18′44″E
- Country: Poland
- Voivodeship: Lesser Poland
- County: Nowy Targ
- Gmina: Ochotnica Dolna

Młynne [ˈmwɨnnɛ] is a village in the administrative district of Gmina Ochotnica Dolna, within Nowy Targ County, Lesser Poland Voivodeship, in southern Poland.
