= Gorce Mountains =

Mountain range in Poland

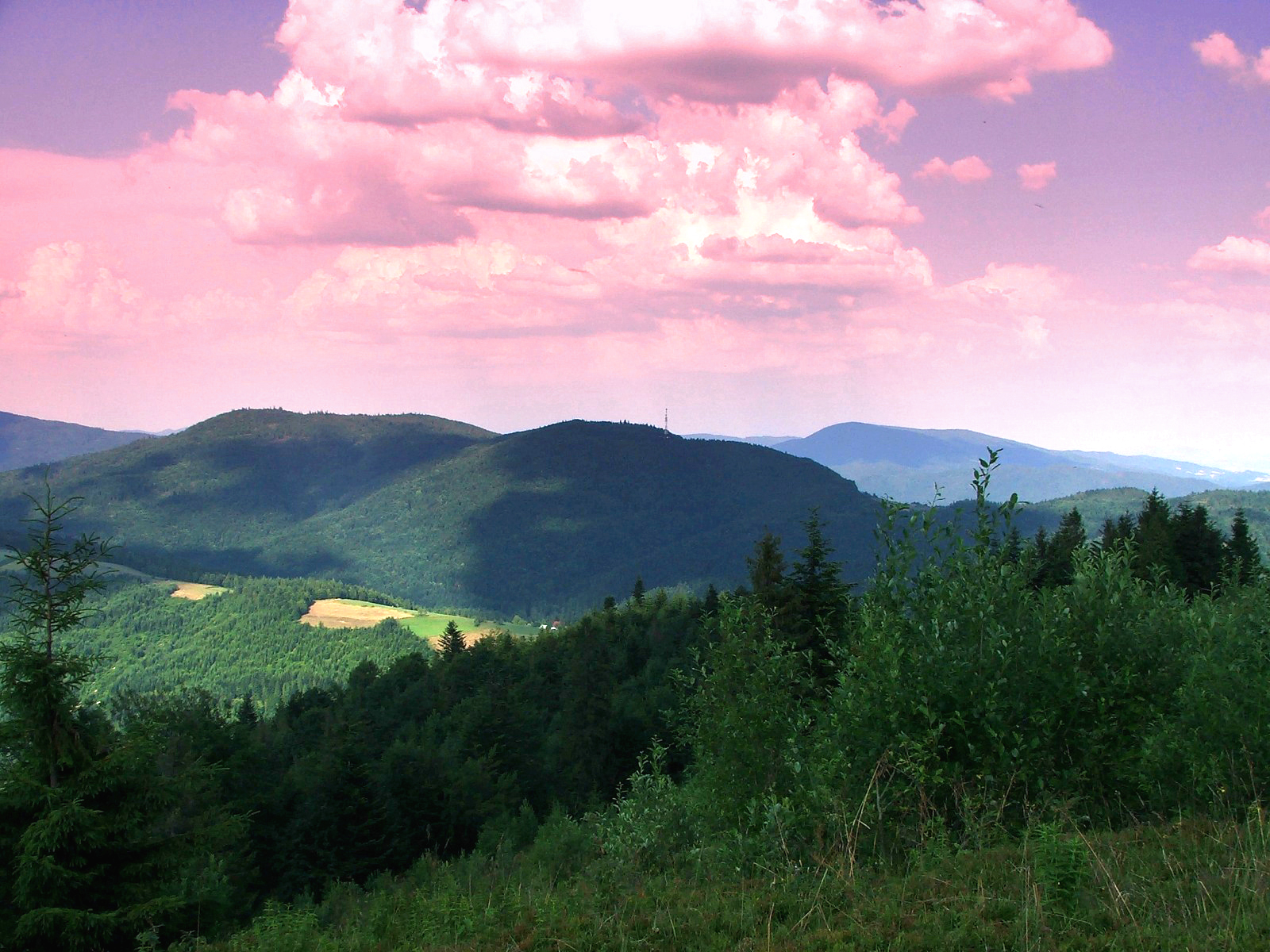
- View of Mount Kiczora from Jaworzyna Kamienicka

Highest point
- Peak: Turbacz
- Elevation: 1,310 m (4,300 ft)
- Listing: Mountains of Poland
- Coordinates: 49°32′36″N 20°6′47″E

Naming
- Native name: Gorce (Polish)

Geography
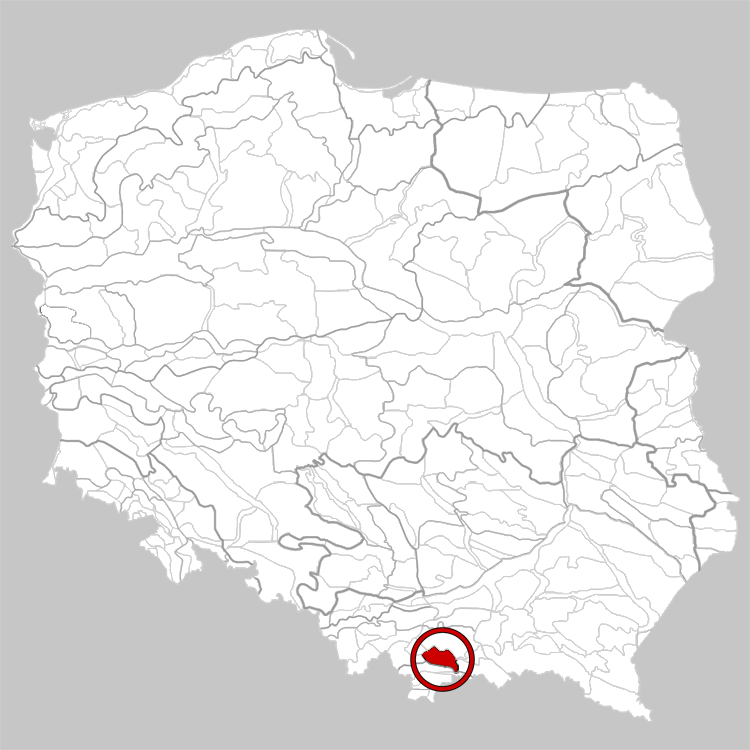
- Location of the Gorce Mountains
- Country: Poland
- Region(s): Lesser Poland Voivodeship, Podhale, Zagórze, Ochotnica region
- Settlement: Ochotnica Dolna Poręba Wielka Mszana Dolna
- Parent range: Western Beskids
- Borders on: Western Carpathian range

The Gorce Mountains (Polish: Gorce, Polish pronunciation: [ˈɡɔrt͡sɛ]) are part of the Western Beskids mountain range spreading across southernmost Poland. They are situated in Małopolska Province, at the western tip of the long Carpathian range extending east beyond the Dunajec River for some 1,500 kilometres (930 mi). The Gorce are characterized by numerous ridges reaching in all directions for up to 40 kilometres (25 mi) east–west with a series of higher elevations cut by deep river valleys.

The range is dominated by about a dozen gentle peaks including Turbacz (the highest, at 1,310 metres (4,300 ft) above sea level) in the centre, and – facing east: Jaworzyna Kamienicka (1,288 metres (4,226 ft)), Kiczora (1,282 metres (4,206 ft)), Kudłoń (1,276 metres (4,186 ft)), Przysłop, Czoło and Gorc Kamienicki. The south-eastern ridge of the Gorce reaches the Pieniny range (cut off by the Ochotnica pass), with Lubań (1,225 metres (4,019 ft)) as its tallest peak followed by Pasterski Wierch, Runek and Marszałek. The north-west ridges include Obidowiec, and the peak of Suhora (1,000 m (3,300 ft)) featuring an astronomical observatory owned and operated by the Pedagogical University of Kraków.

There are a number of smaller caves in the Gorce, carved out in sedimentary rock and its conglomerates which form the Carpathian Flysch Belt. High annual rainfall is caused by the air forced up by the mountains and accumulating into clouds. Rain water flows fast in all directions due to dense ground and ground-cover; feeding the Raba river on the north-west side of the Gorce, and the Dunajec on the south-east side. Other rivers, formed by the mountains include the Kamienica (35 kilometres (22 mi) in length), the Ochotnica (24 kilometres (15 mi)) and the Porębianka (13 kilometres (8.1 mi)), as well as large streams such as the Turbacz, the Gorcowy and the Łopuszna among others. The main city is Nowy Targ on the Dunajec below in the valley of Podhale, with large recreational villages including Krościenko nad Dunajcem, Szczawa and Ochotnica.

== Geography ==
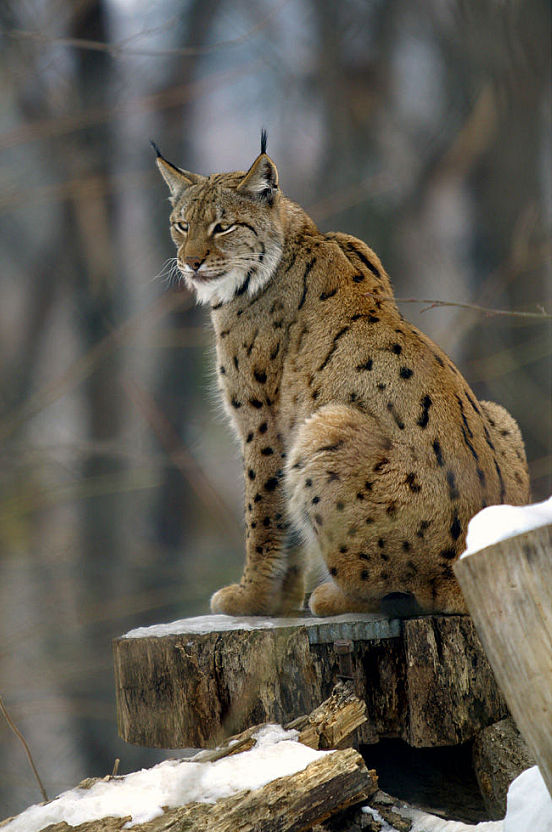
A Lynx in Gorce National Park

A Fire salamander in its natural habitat

Part of the Gorce Mountains are protected within Gorce National Park (Polish: Gorczański Park Narodowy), a bird sanctuary and a biodiversity conservation area designated in 1981 by the Małopolska Province, with strictly protected zone covering 3,611 hectares, out of the total park area of 7,030 hectares (27.1 sq mi), in the highest part of the Gorce.

Wildlife include almost 50 mammal species, with wolf and lynx at the top; less frequent brown bear, and lutra (rare European otter), as well as marten and badger often found digging under pasture fields. The Hazel and the Forest dormouse along with the Edible dormouse are all strictly protected. There are over 200 Red deer counted in the park area, as well as Roe deer and Wild boar, fox, wildcat, hare, skunk, and stoat (the ermine). Reptiles and amphibians include the fire salamander (Latin: Salamandra salamandra, the only amphibian (one of two Salamandridae) that give birth to fully formed offspring at high elevations; the symbol of the Park), as well as over ninety species of breeding birds including owl, eagle, hawk, grouse, black stork and others.

In the Gorce, there are hundreds of species of plants, including Alpine and Subalpine plants, which grow in meadows and open areas. Forests cover about 65% of the mountains, in four distinct levels according to elevation. The most common species of trees are beech, spruce and fir, with the average age of up to 100 years.

The Gorce landscape has been altered by human activity. Early settlers appeared in the Gorce area in the 12th century. The first monastery was erected in Ludźmierz by Cistercian monks in 1234. During the reign of Casimir III the Great (Kazimierz Wielki) the first castles were built, including in Czorsztyn, and more new settlements, such as the town of Krościenko (1348) and villages: Kluszkowce (1307), Grywałd (1330), and Tylmanowa (1336), were established along the border with the Kingdom of Hungary, followed by increased commercial logging and transport. However, the Gorce forests suffered most in the 19th century during the imperial rule of Austria-Hungary. Trees were cut on a large scale, especially in easily accessible areas.

The Gorce Mountains are a popular tourist area, with forty well-marked trails for hiking trips two-to-four hours long, split into different levels of difficulty with the maximum distance of 17 kilometres (11 mi) (Raba Niżna-Turbacz Trail, which is twice the average length). Notably, the colors of trail blazes (signs, installed by PTTK for hikers and skiers alike) do not imply levels of difficulty, but rather primary and secondary trails with different length and orientation, for example: the red and blue colors signify trails in east-west and north-south directions, while shortest loops generally use yellow blazes.

1. Red, the longest trail, traversing the entire range: from easternmost Krościenko nad Dunajcem, to Rabka-Zdrój at its western end.
2. Blue trails, from Snozka Pass (Przełęcz Snozka) in the south, to Kamienica (north).
3. Green trails, from Tylmanowa, Niedźwiedź, Nowy Targ (district capital) across the highest peaks (Turbacz, Lubań).
4. Yellow trails, from Ochotnica Górna, Poręba Wielka, Raba Niżna to PTTK mountain chalets usually.
5. Black trails; from Szczawa, Lubomierz, Łopuszna, Mszana Dolna, Rabka-Zdrój across various meadows and passes.
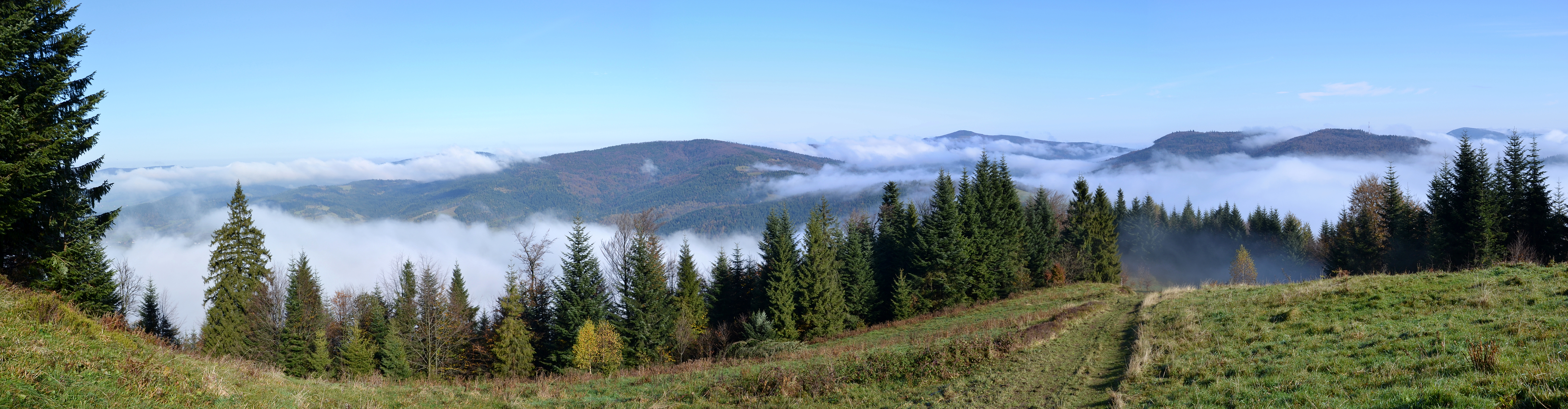
Panorama of the Gorce Mountains

== See also ==
- Geography of Poland
- Tourism in Poland
