= Gmina Ochotnica Dolna =

Gmina Ochotnica Dolna Ochotnica Dolna Commune
- Gmina
- Flag Coat of arms
- Interactive map of Gmina Ochotnica Dolna
- Coordinates (Ochotnica Dolna): 49°32′N 20°19′E
- Country: Poland
- Voivodeship: Lesser Poland
- County: Nowy Targ
- Seat: Ochotnica Dolna

Area
  - Total: 141.03 km^{2} (54.45 sq mi)

Population (2006)
  - Total: 7,921
  - Density: 56.17/km^{2} (145.5/sq mi)
- Website: http://www.ochotnica.pl

Gmina Ochotnica Dolna is a rural gmina (administrative district) in Nowy Targ County, Lesser Poland Voivodeship, in southern Poland. Its seat is the village of Ochotnica Dolna, which lies approximately 23 kilometres (14 mi) east of Nowy Targ and 65 km (40 mi) south-east of the regional capital Kraków.

The gmina covers an area of 141.03 square kilometres (54.5 sq mi), and as of 2006 its total population was 7,921.

== Villages ==
Gmina Ochotnica Dolna contains the villages and settlements of Młynne, Ochotnica Dolna, Ochotnica Górna and Tylmanowa.

== Neighbouring gminas ==
Gmina Ochotnica Dolna is bordered by the gminas of Czorsztyn, Kamienica, Krościenko nad Dunajcem, Łącko and Nowy Targ.
