= Kamienica, Limanowa County =

Kamienica
- Village

- Location within Poland
- Coordinates: 49°34′N 20°20′E
- Country: Poland
- Voivodeship: Lesser Poland
- County: Limanowa
- Gmina: Kamienica
- Highest elevation: 600 m (2,000 ft)
- Lowest elevation: 450 m (1,480 ft)

Population
  - Total: 4,000
- Time zone: UTC+1 (CET)
  - Summer (DST): UTC+2 (CEST)
- Vehicle registration: KLI

Kamienica [kamjɛˈnit͡sa] is a village in Limanowa County, Lesser Poland Voivodeship, in southern Poland. It is the seat of the gmina (administrative district) called Gmina Kamienica. It is situated on the Kamienica River, a tributary of the Dunajec River.

The landmark of Kamienica is the manor estate with an English landscape garden.

== History ==
Following the German-Soviet invasion of Poland, which started World War II in September 1939, the village was occupied by Germany until 1945. The local Polish police chief was murdered by the Russians in the Katyn massacre in 1940.

== Notable residents ==
- Czesław Kukuczka (1935–1974), one of only two known foreign nationals (non-German descent and non-German resident) casualty of the Berlin Wall.
