= Władysław Orkan =

Polish writer and poet (1875–1930)

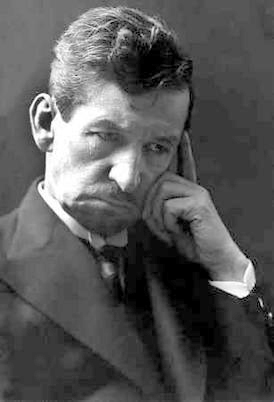
- Władysław Orkan
- Born: Franciszek Ksawery Smaciarz; 27 November 1875; Poręba Wielka, Austria-Hungary
- Died: 14 May 1930 (aged 54); Kraków, Poland
- Resting place: Zakopane
- Occupation: Writer
- Writing career
- Language: Polish
- Period: Young Poland

Władysław Orkan (27 November 1875 – 14 May 1930) (born Franciszek Ksawery Smaciarz, later changed to Smreczyński, also known under his pen name, Orkan) was a Polish Goral writer and poet from the Young Poland period. He is known as one of the greatest Goral writers. The most famous of his works portray the common people from the region and Goral history.

== Biography ==
Born in Poręba Wielka, Limanowa County as Franciszek Ksawery Smaciarz, he attended the elementary school in Szczyrzyc. He started publishing while in the fourth grade; he also joined many extracurricular clubs and organization, including pro-Polish independence ones. Due to his involvement in such activities, his grades suffered, and he never passed the secondary school exit exam. Orkan returned to the village of Poręba, and continued writing. He debuted in 1896 with a publication of a poem, patriotic poem Nad grobem matki and several satirical verses. In 1898 he published his first work, collection of short stories, Nowele; that year he also changed his surname in to Smreczyński. He published more works soon thereafter: another collection short stories Nad urwiskiem in 1900, a novel Komornicy (1900), drama Postronni (1903), a verse volume Z tej smutnej ziemi (1903), novel W roztokach (1908) and others.

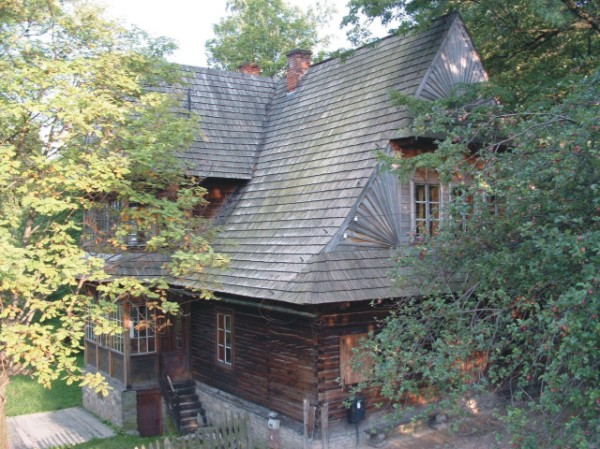
Orkanówka

In early 1900s he started construction of a new house; the building later became the Biographical Museum of Władysław Orkan (Muzeum Biograficzne Władysława Orkana or Orkanówka for short). At that time he also married Maria Zwierzyńska and they had one child, Zofia. Maria died three years after giving birth, and Władysław Orkan, always troubled with finances, asked his sister to raise his daughter. He later married Bronisława Folejewska. During those years he also travelled to Italy, Switzerland, and Germany.

During the First World War he joined the Polish Legions (4th Regiment). For most of his life he stayed in Poręba village. In addition to writing, he was also an activist for the region, cofounder and member of the Association of Gorals. He wanted to create a single Goral political entity which would be called Greater Podhale (Greater Podhale is an archaic term for the Goral lands and has generally fallen out of use due to it favouring Podhale above all regions) and stressed the ethnic unity of Gorals from all regions. After the war, he continued to write; particularly notable are lyrical poems constituting a cycle Pochwała życia, the drama Widma (1917–1927), the novel Czantoria (1928–1929) and his articles and essays Listy ze wsi (1925–1927). He died in Kraków; shortly before he could collect the 1930 City of Warsaw’s Award for Literature. He is buried at the Rakowicki Cemetery, but next year he was exhumed and moved to the Remembrance Cemetery at Pęksowy Brzyzek, Zakopane. After his death, many regional organisations were set up under his name, to commemorate his contribution to the culture and prestige of the Goral Lands.

== Works ==
One of the most common images in his works was the poor Goral village. His works contain other images as well, including descriptions of mountain countryside and nature, and humorous elements. His early works were inspired by Stanisław Witkiewicz.

=== Poetry ===
- Nad grobem Matki. Dumania. Kraków 1896
- Z tej smutnej ziemi. Lwów 1903
- Z martwej roztoki. Kraków 1912
- Pieśni czasu. Piotrków 1915

=== Dramas ===
- Skapany świat. Dramat w czterech aktach z epilogiem. Lwów 1903
- Ofiara. Fragment w trzech aktach z r.1846. Kraków 1905
- Wina i kara. Tragedia. Kraków 1905
- Franek Rakoczy. Epilog w trzech aktach. Lwów 1908

=== Short stories ===
- Nowele. Warszawa 1898
- Nad urwiskiem. Szkice i obrazki. Lwów 1900
- Herkules nowożytny i inne wesołe rzeczy. Kraków 1905
- Miłość pasterska. Nowele. Lwów 1908
- Wesele Prometeusza. Warszawa 1921

=== Novels ===
- Komornicy. Lwów 1900
- W roztokach (tom I i II). Lwów 1903
- Pomór. Kraków 1910
- Drzewiej. Kraków 1912
- Kostka Napierski. Warszawa 1925

=== Non-fiction ===
- Drogą Czwartaków. Od Ostrowca na Litwę. Kraków 1916
- Listy ze wsi (tom I i II). Warszawa 1925-1927
- Warta. Studia, listy, szkice. Lwów 1926
- Wskazania. Warszawa 1930

=== Unfinished ===
- Czantoria (i inne pisma społeczne). Warszawa 1936
