= Czesław Kukuczka =

Polish man who died at the Berlin Wall

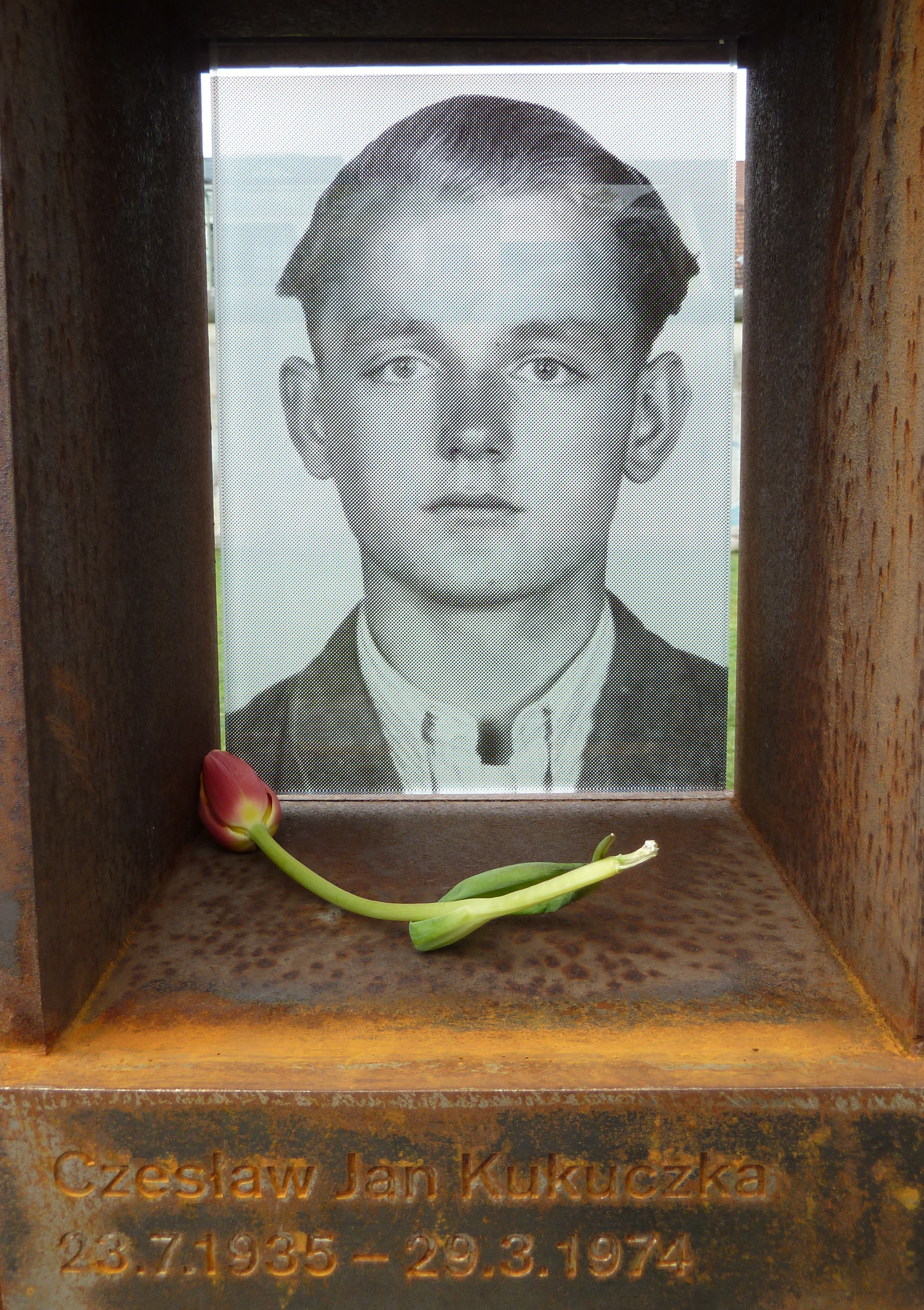
- Czesław Kukuczka, at the Window of Remembrance, Berlin Wall Memorial
- Born: 23 July 1935; Kamienica, Second Polish Republic
- Died: 29 March 1974 (aged 38); East Berlin, East Germany
- Cause of death: Gunshot wounds
- Resting place: Kamienica, Polish People's Republic
- Monuments: Window of Remembrance, Berlin Wall Memorial, Berlin
- Known for: One of three non-German escapees to die at the Berlin Wall

Czesław Kukuczka (23 July 1935 – 29 March 1974) was a Polish man who became the 114th known person to die at the Berlin Wall. Kukuczka was assassinated during an attempt to threaten the Polish People's Republic embassy in East Germany into allowing him to migrate to West Berlin, becoming one of only three non-German escapee victims of the Berlin Wall.

== Biography ==
Czesław Jan Kukuczka was born on 23 July 1935, in Kamienica, Second Polish Republic, and grew up there. As a young boy, the local magazine “Gorczańskie Wieści" mentioned him as "the most active of the hotheads - young, full of ideas, and capable of dedication." At the age of 17, Kukuczka was recruited to participate in the construction of Nowa Huta, a socialist model city on the eastern outskirts of Kraków being built by the Polish People's Republic, but soon returned home disillusioned with his work there. A year later, at 18 years-old, Kukuczka was found guilty of embezzlement and sentenced to two and a half years in prison in Nowy Sącz and Jaworzno, but was released after one year on parole. Shortly after his release Kukuczka was married and would father three children, and subsequently worked again in construction before working as a firefighter for the fire department in Jaworzno. On Sunday, 3 March 1974, Kukuczka disappeared without a trace and was not seen again until appearing on 29 March 1974, in East Berlin, East Germany.

== Death ==
On 29 March 1974, at 12:30 PM, Kukuczka arrived at in the Polish People's Republic Embassy in East Berlin claiming to have an important message, and was admitted to the embassy without further control. He would be hosted by Colonel Maksymilian Karnowski, a member of the East Berlin operational group of the Polish Ministry of the Interior (MSW) (pl), and an employee named Olszewski. Kukuczka demanded that he be allowed to cross into West Berlin at 3:00 PM, via the border crossing and international train station at Friedrichstraße, and threatened to detonate a bomb that he was carrying with him, with the detonating cord connected to his left hand. Kukuczka also claimed that if his demands were not met, a supposed accomplice would bomb the Polish Information and Cultural Center on Karl-Liebknecht-Straße, and the events would be reported about in the western world because of another accomplice he claimed to have in West Berlin. Further in his conversation, Kukuczka indicated wishing to immigrate to the United States where he had aunts, and according to documents found on his person their address was in the city of Hollywood, Florida. Kukuczka was counting on the Polish People's Republic embassy personnel to create the necessary travel documents so he could leave East Berlin, which they did provide him with.

Kukuczka departed in the Polish People's Republic Embassy at 2:40 PM with the necessary documents, and was transported to Bahnhof Friedrichstraße by a car belonging to the Stasi, the East German secret police. He disembarked at the train station, used the rest room, then attempted to make his way through the border security. West German students visiting from Bad Hersfeld reported to police in West Berlin later that Kukuczka, shabbily dressed, walked past them toward the crossing. As they watched, Kukuczka was shot in the back from a distance of two meters by a civilian wearing a dark coat and tinted sunglasses. Kukuczka, who was seriously injured but still alive, was then taken away by ambulance. While most persons injured at the Berlin Wall were normally taken to the nearby Krankenhaus der Volkspolizei (Hospital of the People's Police), Kukuczka was taken instead to the infirmary in the Stasi prison at Hohenschönhausen, 10 kilometers away. By 6:30 PM, Kukuczka was dead from numerous internal injuries caused by the gunshot wounds.

Kukuczka's widow in the Polish People's Republic, Emilia, was presented with an urn containing his remains on 24 May 1974, along with a package containing personal effects from her deceased husband, and a death certificate, all presented by the district prosecutor. The next day, the mayor of Kamienica reported that a church burial had taken place with only Kukuczka's close family in attendance, and the full details regarding his death, such as the fake bomb and the visit to the embassy, were not made known to the family or local residents until after the Berlin Wall fell.

== Trial ==
A trial against Kukuczka's murderer began at the Berlin Regional Court on 14 March 2024. On 14 October, the court sentenced a former Stasi officer identified as 80-year old Martin Manfred Naumann to ten years' imprisonment for shooting Kukuczka.

== Aftermath ==
Kukuczka is notable as one of only three known escapee deaths at the Berlin Wall to be neither German or an East German resident, along with Franciszek Piesik, also Polish, and Vladimir Odinzov, a Soviet soldier.

== See also ==
- List of deaths at the Berlin Wall
- Berlin Crisis of 1961
