= Poręba Wielka, Limanowa County =

Poręba Wielka
- Village
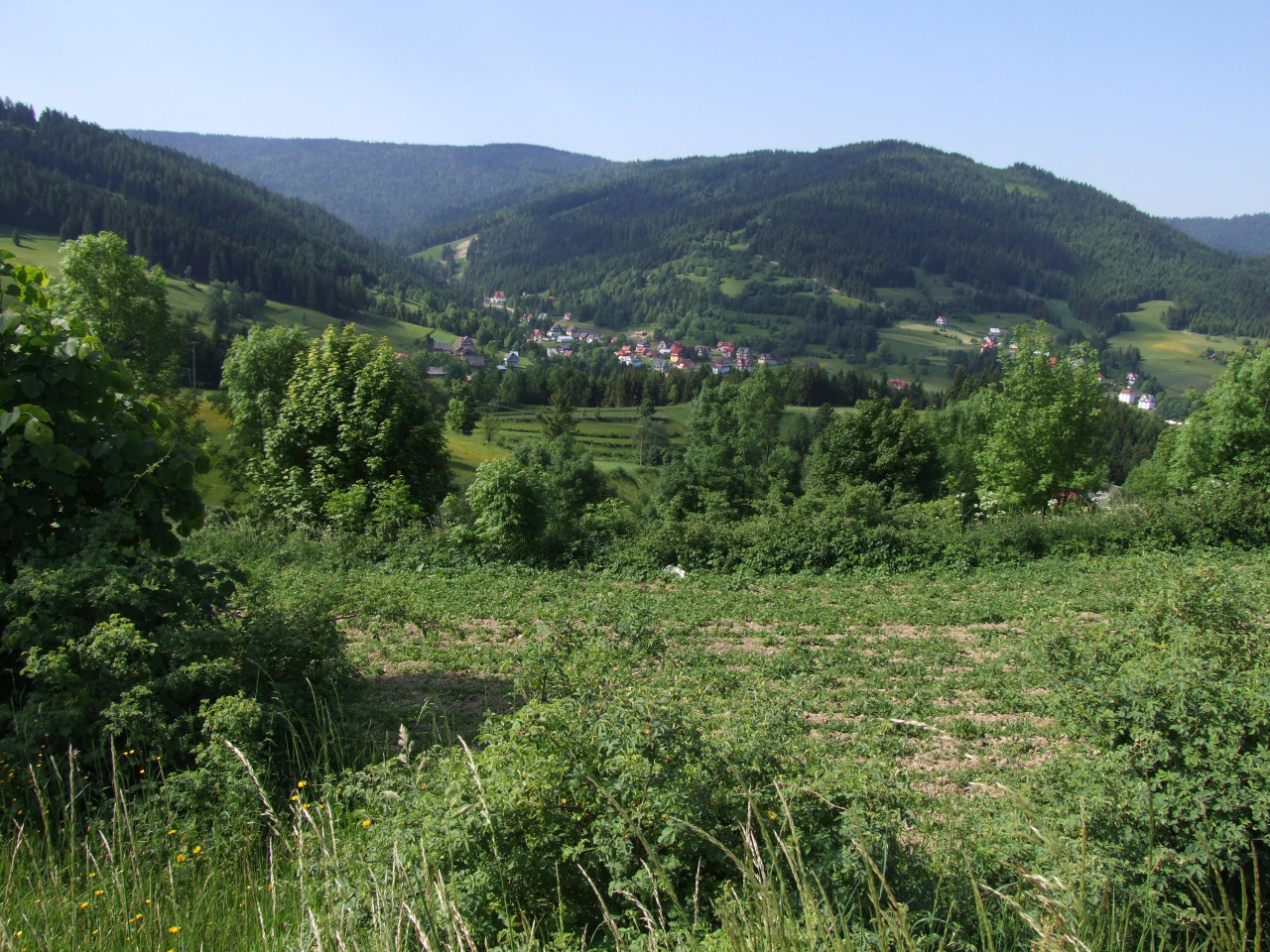
- View of the village under the Tobołów peak

- Location within Poland
- Coordinates: 49°36′38″N 20°3′45″E
- Country: Poland
- Voivodeship: Lesser Poland
- County: Limanowa
- Gmina: Niedźwiedź
- Population: 2,100

Poręba Wielka [pɔˈrɛmba ˈvjɛlka] is a village in the administrative district of Gmina Niedźwiedź, within Limanowa County, Lesser Poland Voivodeship, in southern Poland.

Poręba Wielka is known for its thermal water deposits with health properties. The deposits were discovered in the 1970s, and their exploitation for recreational and therapeutic purposes began after 2022.

The village is the cite of the Gorce National Park. Polish writer Władysław Orkan was born here.
