= Ochotnica Górna =

- Village
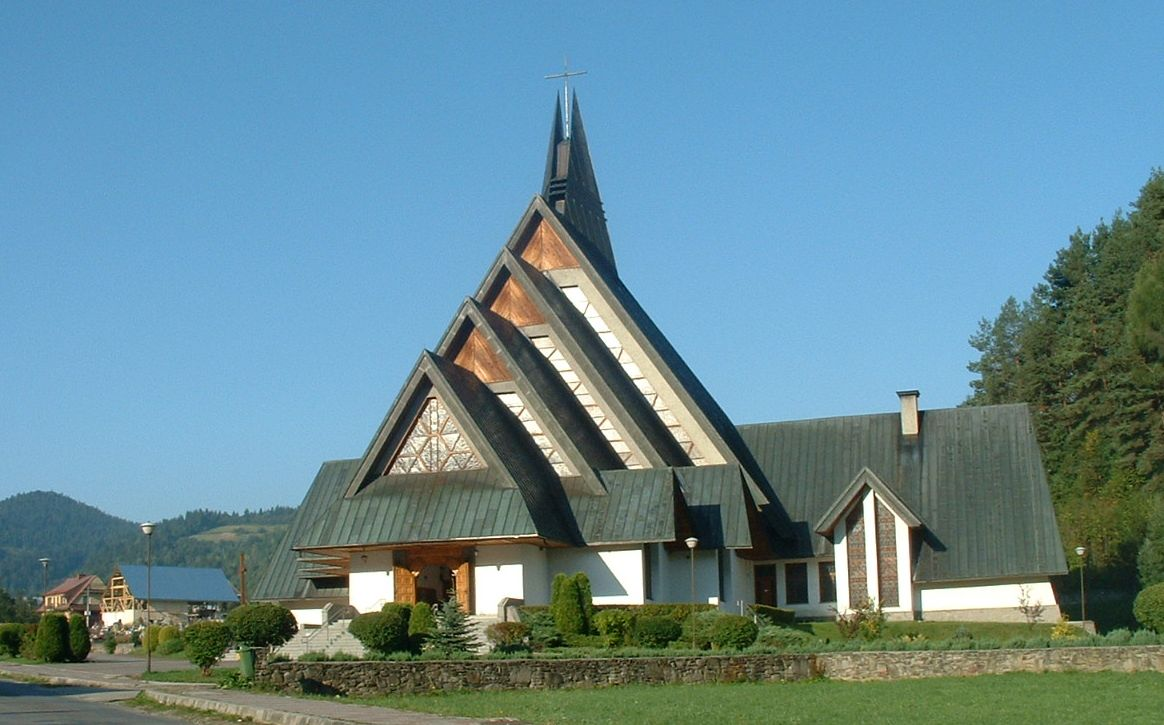
- Ascension of the Virgin Mary Church

- Location within Poland
- Coordinates: 49°31′N 20°15′E
- Country: Poland
- Voivodeship: Lesser Poland
- County: Nowy Targ
- Gmina: Ochotnica Dolna
- Population (approx.): 2,100

Ochotnica Górna [ɔxɔtˈnit͡sa ˈɡurna] is a village in the administrative district of Gmina Ochotnica Dolna, within Nowy Targ County, Lesser Poland Voivodeship, in southern Poland.

The village has an approximate population of 2,100.
