= Gorce National Park =

National park in Poland

- Gorczański Park Narodowy
- IUCN category II (national park)
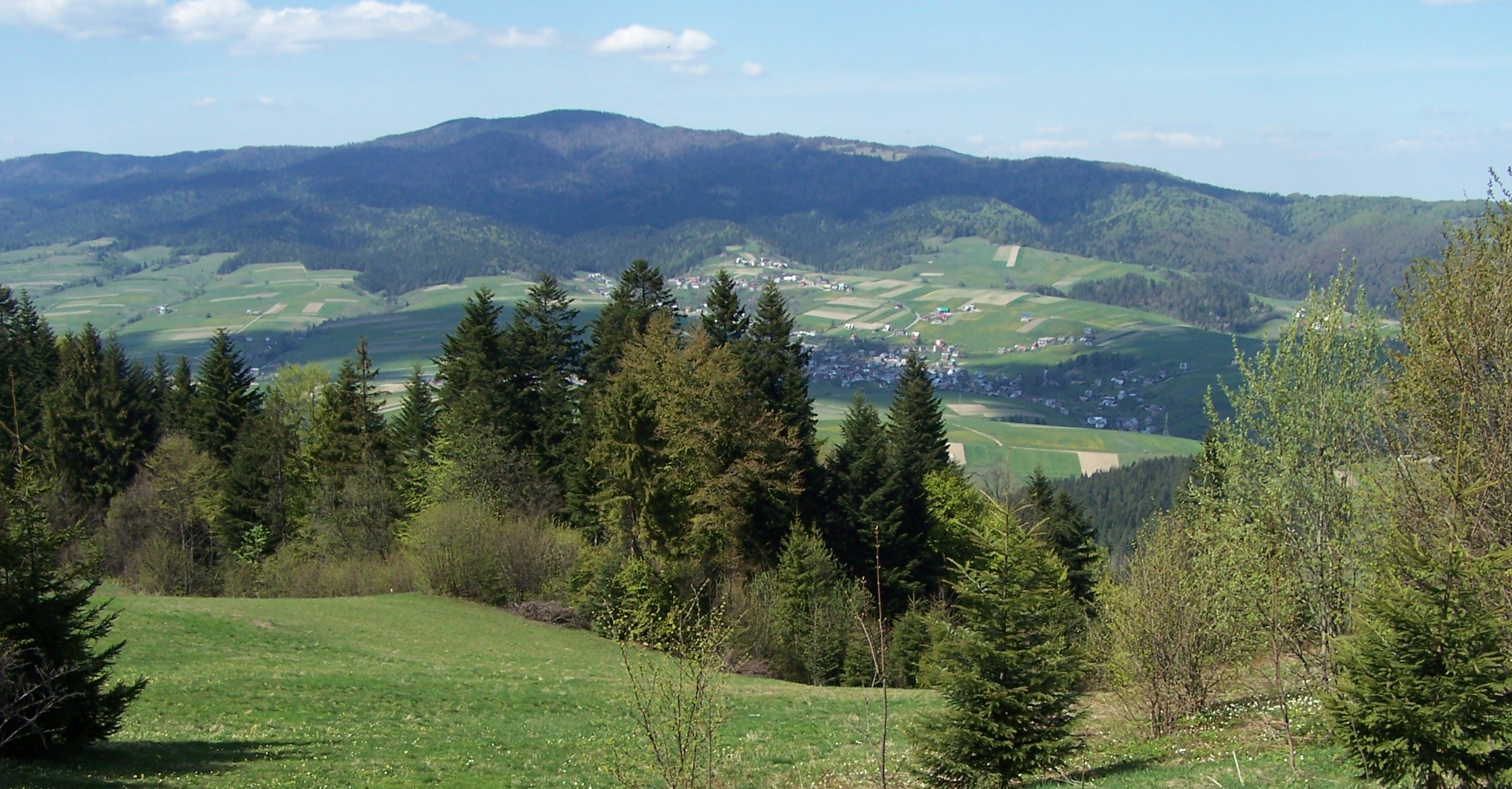
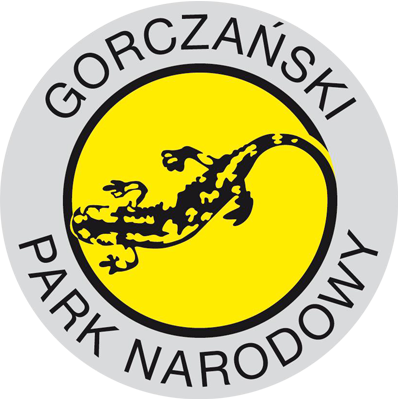
- View of south-eastern ridge of Lubań (1,211 m) Park logo with Fire salamander

- Location within Poland
- Location: Lesser Poland Voivodeship, Poland
- Nearest city: Nowy Targ
- Coordinates: 49°35′N 20°3′E
- Area: 70.3 km^{2} (27.1 sq mi)
- Established: 1981
- Governing body: Ministry of the Environment
- Website: Official website

Gorce National Park (Polish: Gorczański Park Narodowy) is a national park in Lesser Poland Voivodeship, southern Poland. It covers central and northeastern parts of the Gorce Mountains, which are part of the Western Beskids (at the western end of the Carpathian range).

The first steps to protect this land go back to 1927, when a forest reserve was set up on land owned by Count Ludwik Wodzicki of Poręba Wielka. The National Park was created in 1981, then covering 23.9 square kilometres. Today, the area of the park has grown to 70.3 km^{2} (27.1 sq mi), of which 65.91 km^{2} is forested. The area of the protective zone around the park is 166.47 km^{2}. The park lies within Limanowa County and Nowy Targ County, and has its headquarters in Poręba Wielka.

The Gorce range is dominated by arched peaks, with river valleys cutting into the range. There are a few small caves and obviously - several peaks such as Turbacz (the highest - 1310 meters above sea level), Jaworzyna Kamienicka, Kiczora, Kudłoń, Czoło Turbacza and Gorc Kamienicki. Waters cover only 0.18 km^{2} of park's area - there are no lakes or big rivers, only streams.

== Geography ==
Map of Gorce National Park

In the whole Gorce range there are hundreds of species of plants, including Alpine and Subalpine plants which grow on meadows. Forests cover about 95% of park's area and most common species are spruce, beech and fir. There are some openings which are mostly the result of prior human activity. First settlers appeared in the Gorce area in the 14th century but Gorce's forests suffered most in the 19th century. Back then, trees were cut down on a large scale, especially in easily accessible areas.

Animal life is abundant and it includes over 90 species of breeding birds and almost fifty (50) mammal species including lynx, wolf and bear. Also there are frogs, snakes and salamanders (the latter, a rare fire salamander, is the symbol of the park).

The Jaworzyna Kamienicka glade, one of the most beautiful in this range and located on Jaworzyna Kamienicka, itself the second-highest peak of Gorce, houses the historical Bulanda Chapel, funded at the beginning of the 20th century by Gorce's most famous shepherd, Tomasz Chlipała. Gorce's most well-known cave is also nearby – Zbójnicka Jama.

=== Inhabitation ===
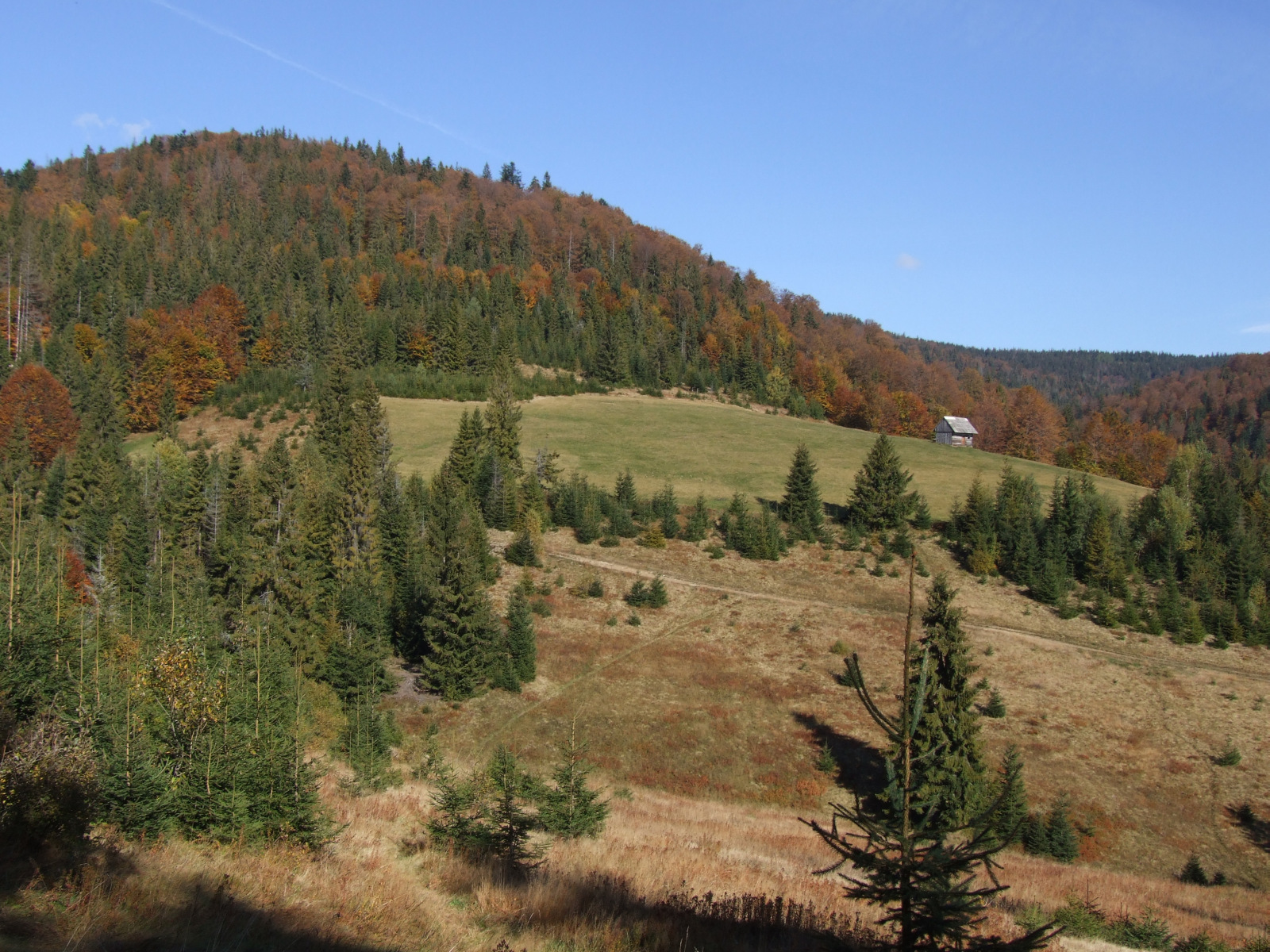
Slopes of Polana Fiedorówka

The park's overall landscape is of an undisturbed character which means that the areas of human activities are on the outside. There are not a lot of tourists that visit, but for those that do the park can be a haven for nature lovers. Climbing soft peaks of the Gorce Mountains makes it possible to check out surrounding national treasures, including Tatra and the Pieniny Mountains.
