= Męcina =

- Village
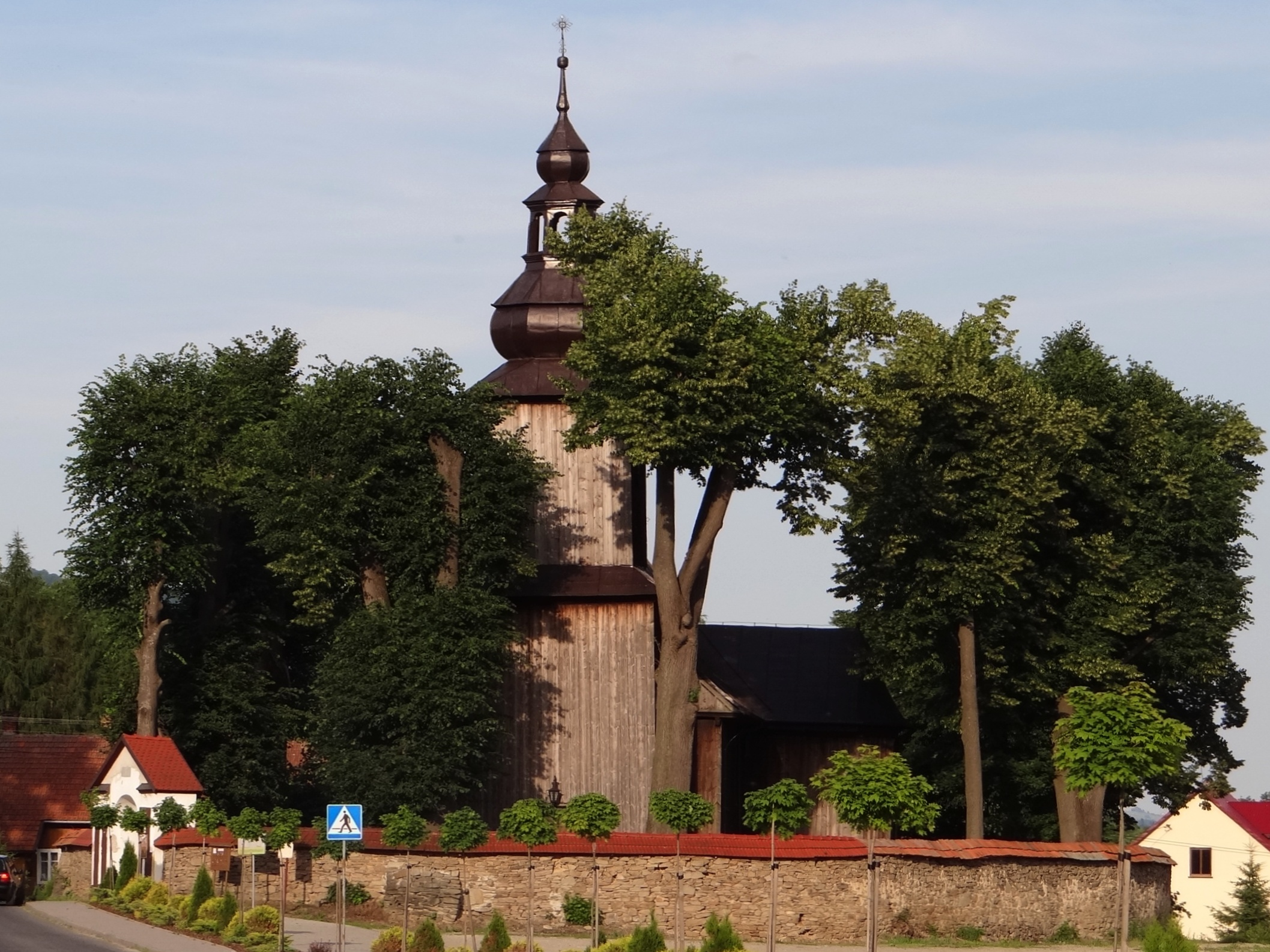
- Old wooden Church of Saint Anthony

- Location within Poland
- Coordinates: 49°40′43″N 20°32′50″E
- Country: Poland
- Voivodeship: Lesser Poland
- County: Limanowa
- Gmina: Limanowa
- Population: 3,248
- Website: http://www.mecina.prv.pl

Męcina [mɛnˈt͡ɕina] is a village in the administrative district in the Malopolska province of Gmina Limanowa, within Limanowa County, Lesser Poland Voivodeship, in southern Poland. In the years 1975–1998 the town administratively belonged to the province of Nowy Sacz.

== Location ==
Męcina rests at the edge of a hill called Litacz in the Łososińskie range in Beskid Wyspowy. on a stream called Smolnik, which is a tributary of the river Dunajec. A county road runs thru the village to Limanowa and to Chełmiec, and a local railway line to Chabówka and to Nowy Sącz, a yellow tourist trail leads to the mountain ridge of Łososińskiego.

== History ==
The oldest traces of human activity in the region are documented in the area between the villages of Męcina and Pisarzowa. Archaeological excavations have revealed funeral urns from the times of the Lusatian culture, which in Poland lasted between 1300–400 BC.

The first mention of the village comes from Alms of St Peter from 1326 and relate to the local parish.

At the end of the sixteenth century the village was divided into upper and lower Męcina, ruled by the Krzesz and Marcinkowski families. In the mid-sixteenth century Męcina's lord Sebastian Krzesz fell into disagreement with the local parish priest, which soon turned into open conflict. Krzesz, eventually exiled the priest, seized his property, destroyed parish registers and invited two preachers of the arian Polish Brethren. In the church instead of the altar a plain wooden cross was placed. During the Reformation the church served as an arian congregation.

It was only in 1605 that a new Catholic priest arrived and he had to start his ministry with the renovation of the church, in which he was helped financially by the next heir of the House of Krzesz – Stanisław, who converted to Catholicism.

In the nineteenth century Męcina's pastor was Father Vincent Wąsikiewicz, a researcher of folk culture, an author of books and ethnographic studies. During this period there were several noble mansions and manors in the area. In Lower Męcina a manor called "White" (opposite to the present day school) owned by the Gostkowski family, close to Kłodno was a manor called "Bobrówka" (today, leaving behind two small granaries). In the Upper Męcina was a manor called "Dębina" (approx. 1 km from the church, at the top of the village, on the right side of the road to the Pisarzowa), owned by another branch of the Gostkowski family.

After World War II, Męcina became famous throughout Poland and beyond its borders due to the Bronislaw Smoleń hockey stick factory. Bronislaw Smoleń was also engaged in initiating the construction of a school in Męcina and many other social actions. On the wall of the school is a plaque dedicated to his person, unveiled on 1 September 1997.

== Interesting and historic buildings in the village ==
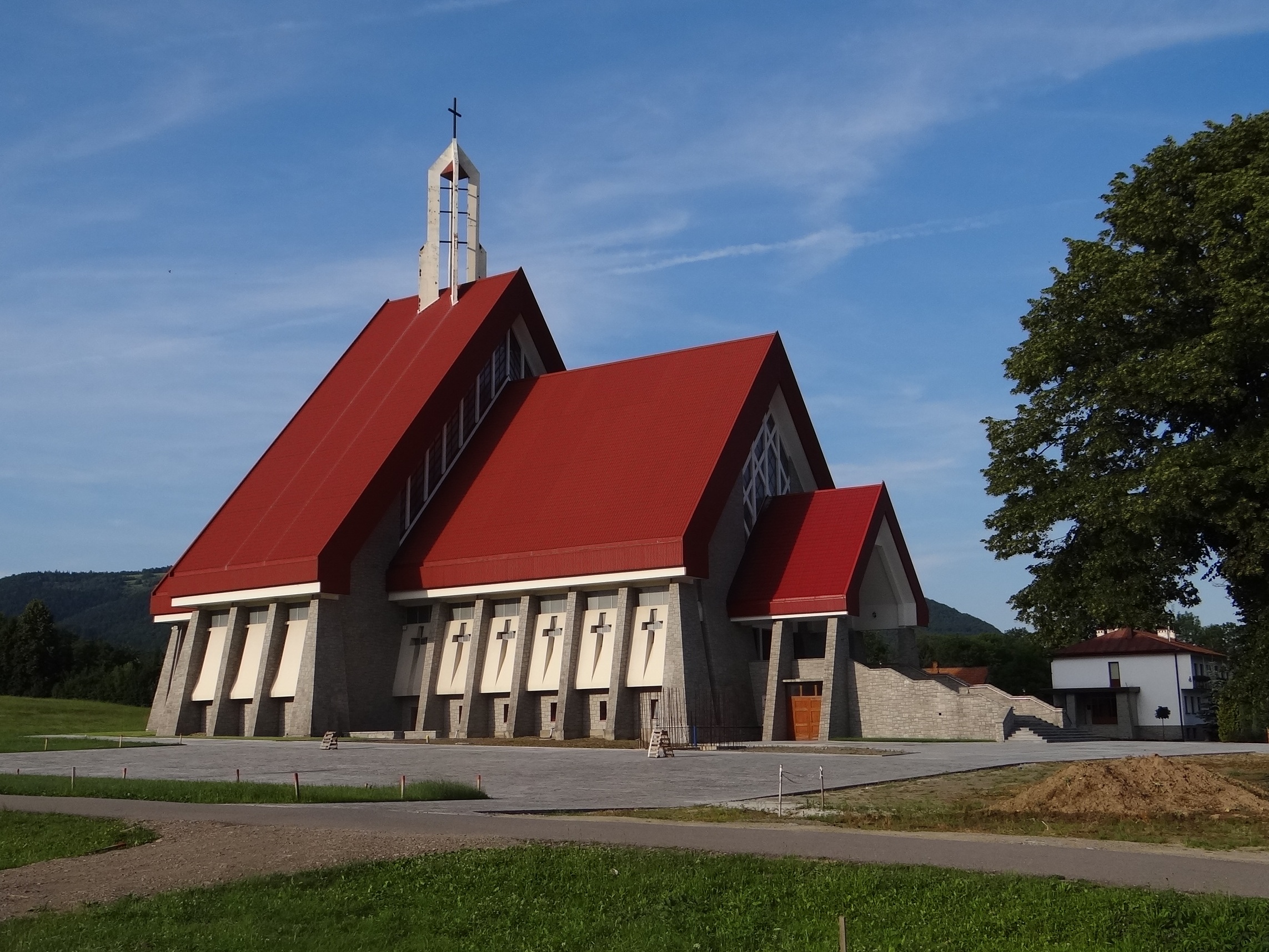
New Church of St. Anthony

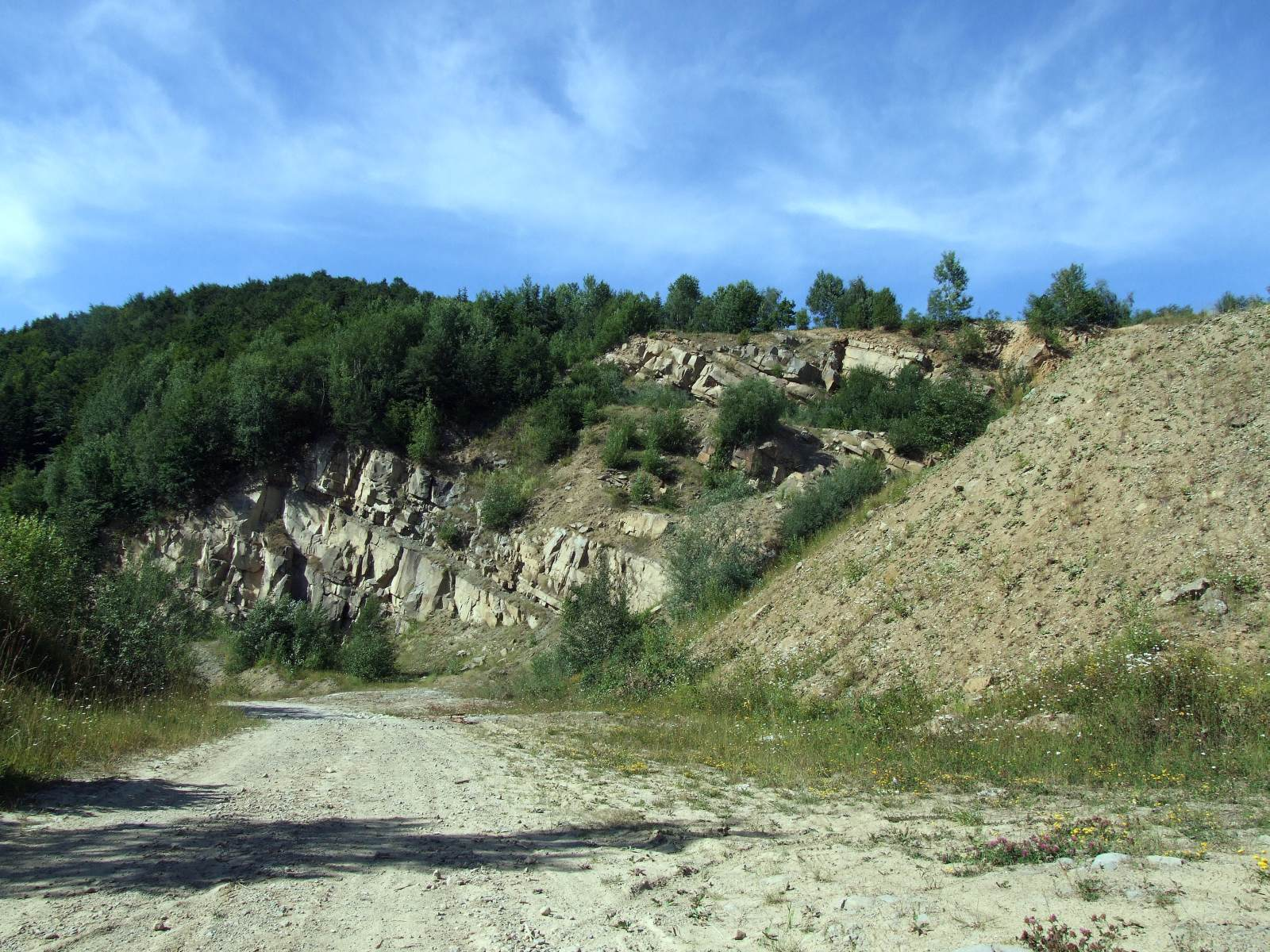
Męcina sandstone quarry

In the center of the village on the road to Nowy Sącz is the wooden church of St. Anthony the Abbot from the end of the seventeenth century, built on the framework of a tower pole construction. Inside is a preserved rood beam with a Baroque crucifix, the choir edging Baroque profiles. A stone crypt with the lords of Męcina and local pastors is located under the altar. The porch has a painting of St. John Cantius and figure of St. John Nepomucene from 1740.

A new church built between 1984 and 2006 serves as the parish church.

Hall of memory of Zdzisław Smoleń – Inspector of the Podhale - Carpathia district of the Związku Strzeleckiego "Strzelec" which gathers a rich collection of family memorabilia, including photos, a collection of military badges, uniforms and weapons (including a Russian saber, captured in the 1920 Battle of Warsaw).

House of creative work and Zygmunt and Jolanta Kłosowscy, local painters and sculptors.

The historic chapel from the seventeenth century in the hamlet Miczaki where local faithful celebrated Mass at a time when the church was converted into an arian congregation.

Above Miczaki is a large sandstone quarry (recently resumed work).

In the lower part of the village, on the road to Krasne Potockie is a ruined two hundred years old mill with fragments of the old mill wheel.

In the center of the village there is also a group of schools, fire station of the local volunteer fire service, a few shops, and railway station.

== Born in Męcina ==
- Ferdinand Piwowar and Władyslaw Pociecha, murdered by soviets in the Katyń massacre

== See also ==
- Męcina Mała,
- Męcina Wielka
