= Mordarka =

- Village
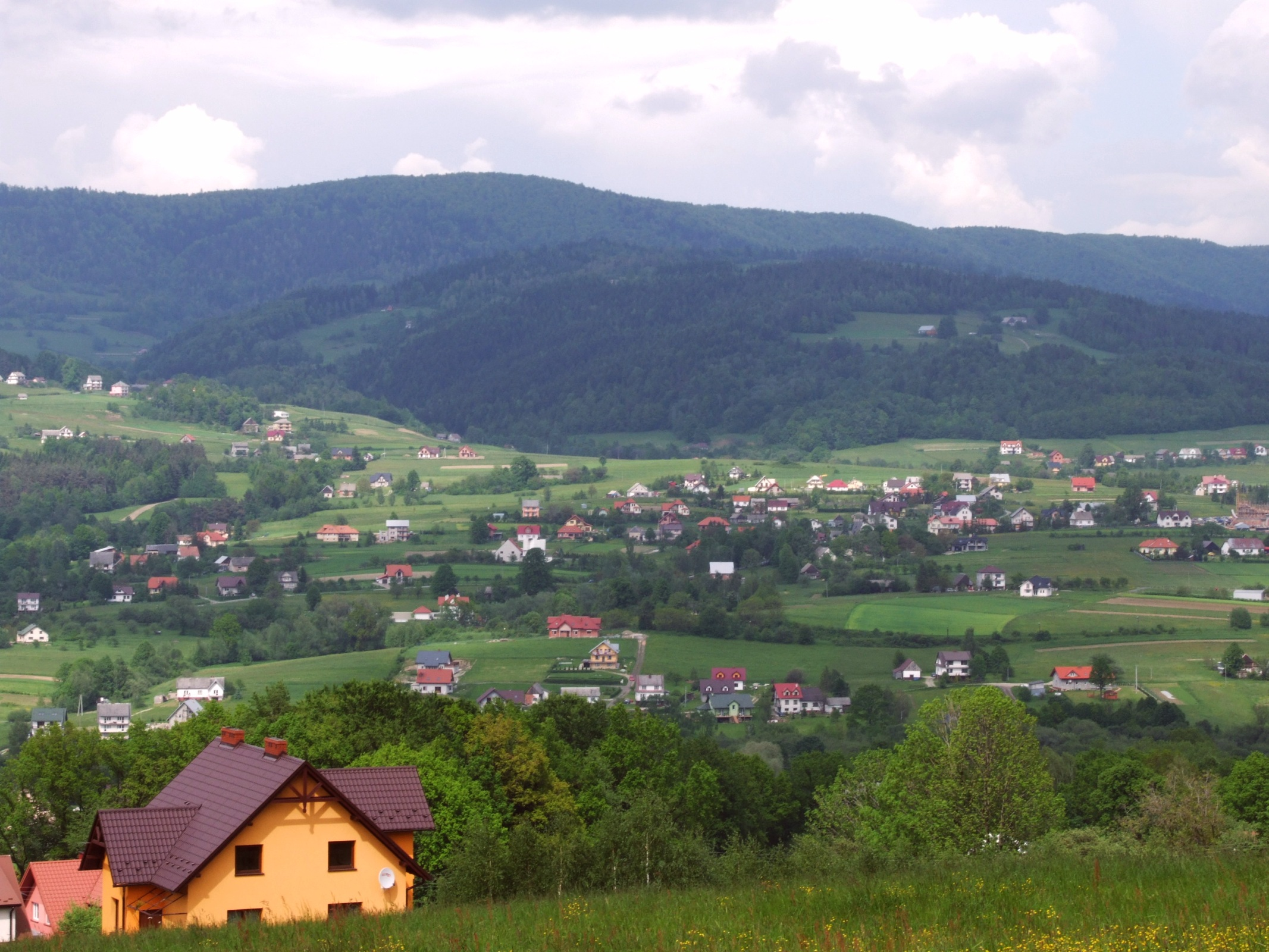

- Location within Poland
- Coordinates: 49°41′50″N 20°27′47″E
- Country: Poland
- Voivodeship: Lesser Poland
- County: Limanowa
- Gmina: Limanowa

Population
  - Total: 2,387
- Time zone: UTC+1 (CET)
  - Summer (DST): UTC+2 (CEST)
- Vehicle registration: KLI

Mordarka [mɔrˈdarka] is a village in the administrative district of Gmina Limanowa, within Limanowa County, Lesser Poland Voivodeship, in southern Poland.

== History ==
In 1881, Mordarka had a population of 772.

During the German invasion of Poland, which started World War II, on 7 September 1939, the Germans committed a massacre of ten people from Limanowa in Mordarka. The victims were nine Jews and a Polish mailman, who tried to persuade the Germans to release the nine arrested Jews.
