= Gmina Słopnice =

Gmina Słopnice Słopnice Commune
- Gmina
- Coat of arms
- Interactive map of Gmina Słopnice
- Coordinates (Słopnice): 49°42′N 20°21′E
- Country: Poland
- Voivodeship: Lesser Poland
- County: Limanowa
- Seat: Słopnice

Area
  - Total: 56.74 km^{2} (21.91 sq mi)

Population (2006)
  - Total: 5,917
  - Density: 104.3/km^{2} (270.1/sq mi)
- Website: www.slopnice.pl

Gmina Słopnice is a rural gmina (administrative district) in Limanowa County, Lesser Poland Voivodeship, in southern Poland. Its seat is the village of Słopnice, which lies approximately 6 kilometres (4 mi) west of Limanowa and 50 km (31 mi) south-east of the regional capital Kraków.

The gmina covers an area of 56.74 square kilometres (21.9 sq mi), and as of 2006 its total population is 5,917.

== Neighbouring gminas ==
Gmina Słopnice is bordered by the town of Limanowa and by the gminas of Dobra, Kamienica, Limanowa and Tymbark.
