= Bałażówka =

- Village
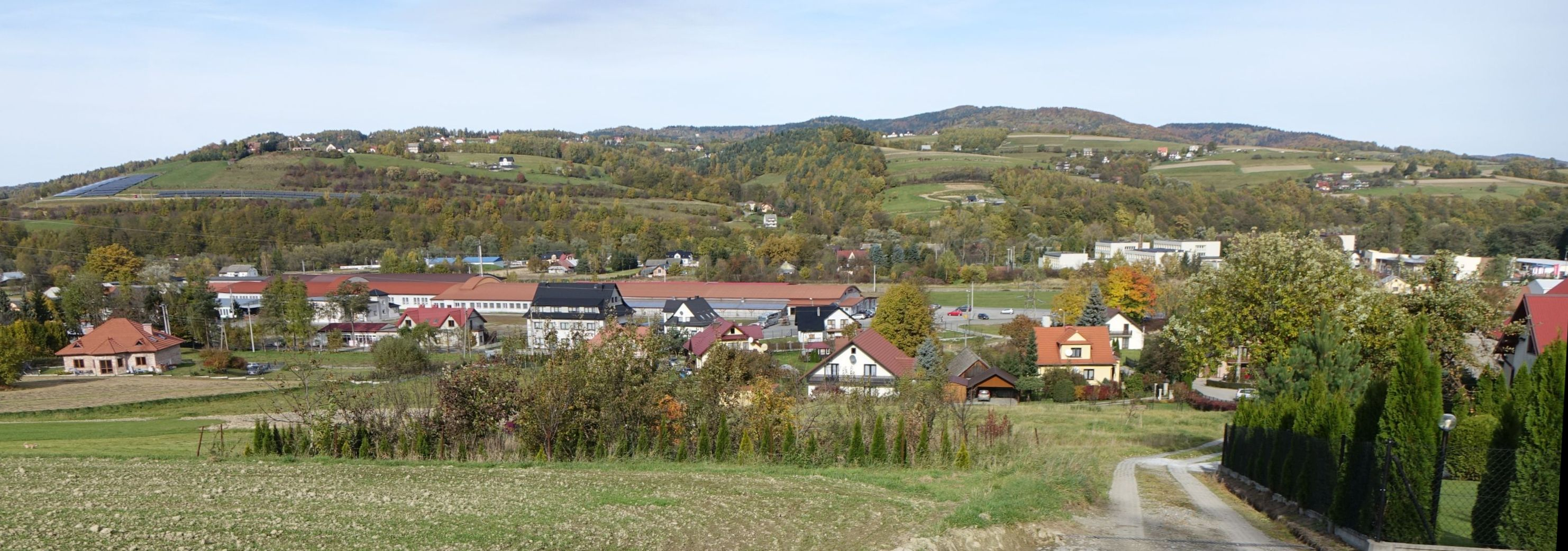

- Location within Poland
- Coordinates: 49°45′10″N 20°21′59″E
- Country: Poland
- Voivodeship: Lesser Poland
- County: Limanowa
- Gmina: Limanowa
- Population: 131

Bałażówka [bawaˈʐufka] is a village in the administrative district of Gmina Limanowa, within Limanowa County, Lesser Poland Voivodeship, in southern Poland.
