= Koszary, Lesser Poland Voivodeship =

Koszary
- Village
- Location within Poland
- Coordinates: 49°44′34″N 20°22′15″E
- Country: Poland
- Voivodeship: Lesser Poland
- County: Limanowa
- Gmina: Limanowa
- Population: 746

Koszary [kɔˈʂarɨ] is a village in the administrative district of Gmina Limanowa, within Limanowa County, Lesser Poland Voivodeship, in southern Poland.
