= Pasierbiec =

- Village
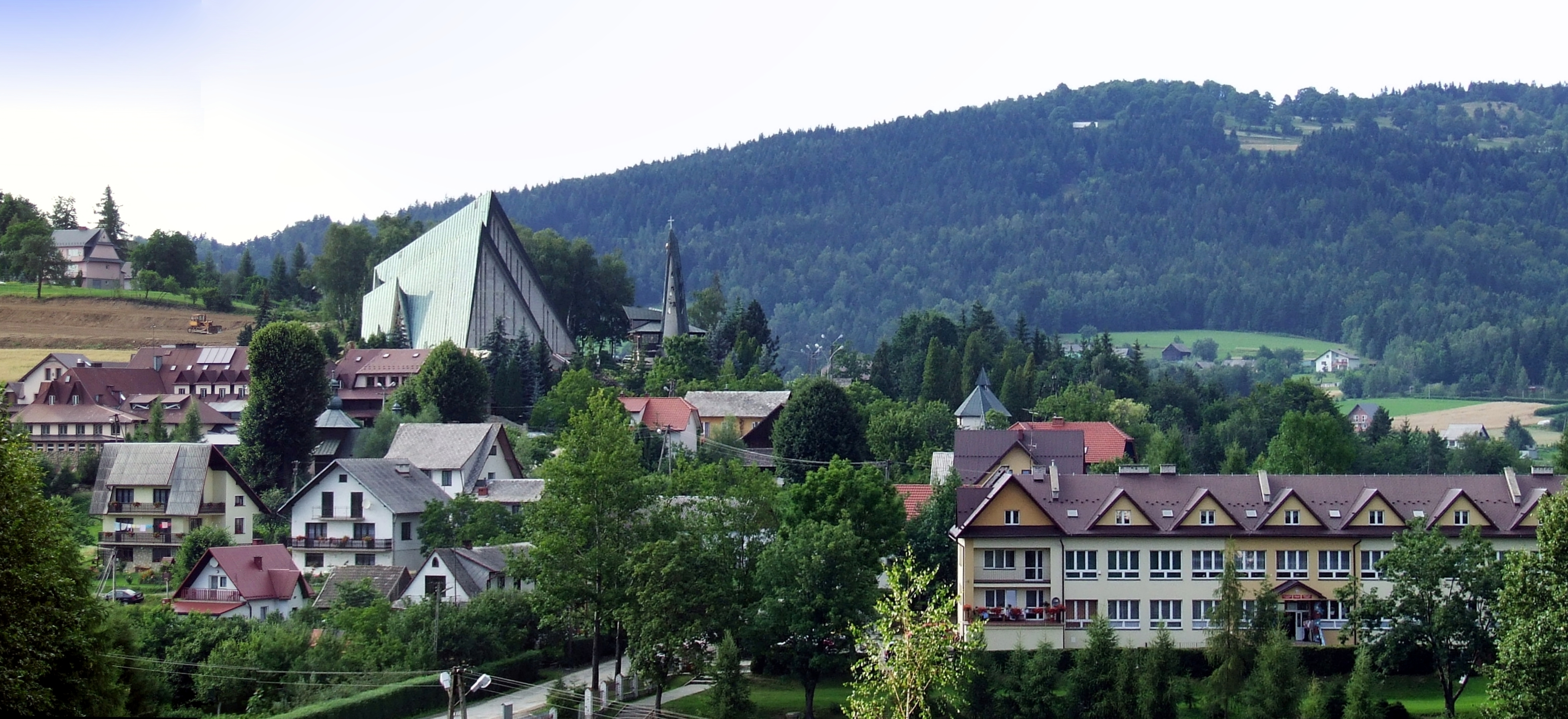
- General view

- Location within Poland
- Coordinates: 49°46′N 20°23′E
- Country: Poland
- Voivodeship: Lesser Poland
- County: Limanowa
- Gmina: Limanowa

Pasierbiec [paˈɕɛrbjɛt͡s] is a village in the administrative district of Gmina Limanowa, within Limanowa County, Lesser Poland Voivodeship, in southern Poland.
