= Kanin (name) =

Kanin is a given name and a surname. Russian feminine form of the surname is Kanina. Notable people with the name include:

== Surname ==
- Fay Kanin
- Garson Kanin
- Michael Kanin
- Vasily Kanin
- Zach Kanin

== Given name ==
- Kanin Howell (1981), American stunt performer
- Kanin Puttamanunt

== See also ==
- Prince Kan'in Kotohito
- Kanina (disambiguation)
