= Rupniów =

- Village
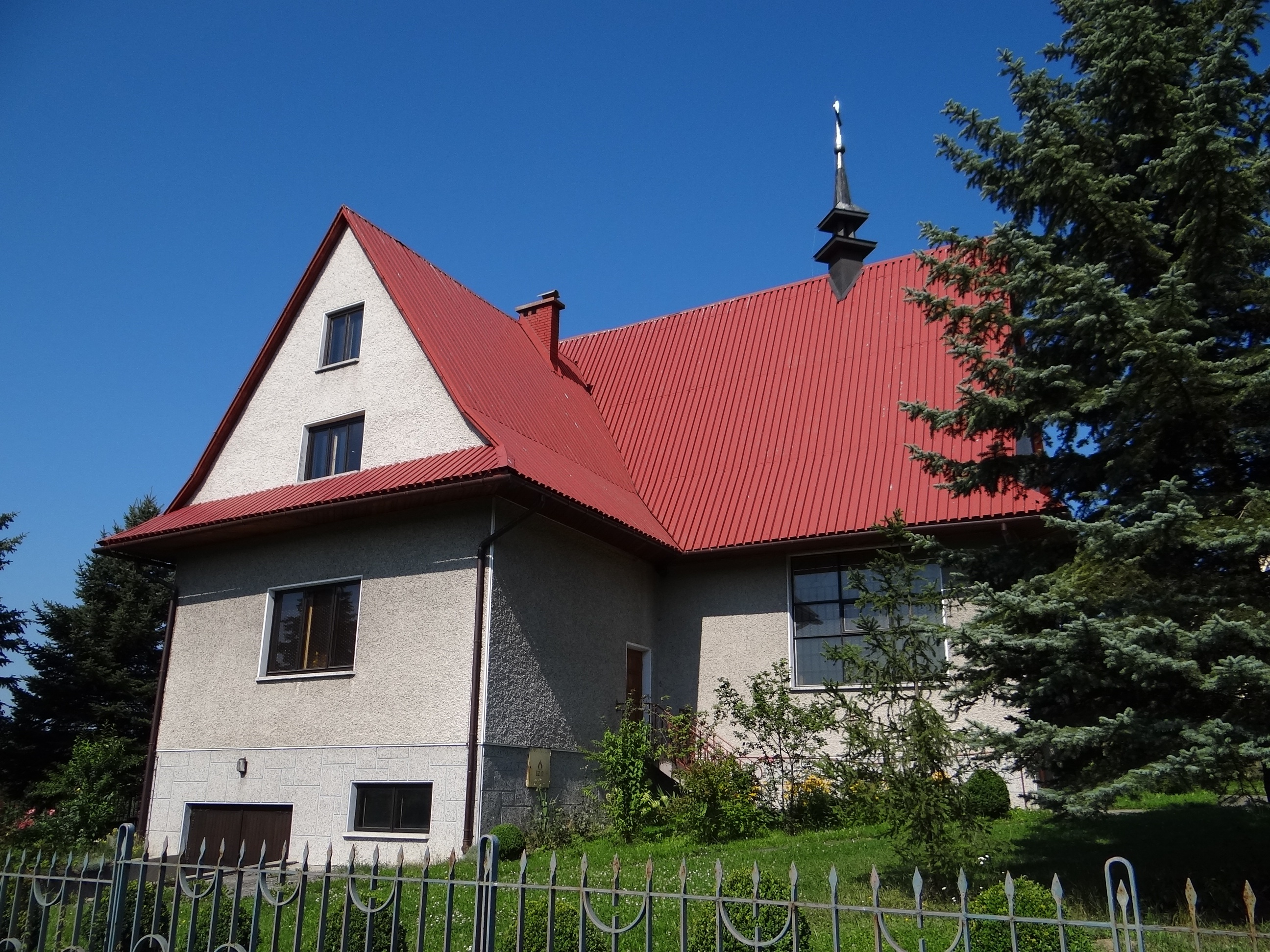
- Chapel

- Location within Poland
- Coordinates: 49°47′N 20°19′E
- Country: Poland
- Voivodeship: Lesser Poland
- County: Limanowa
- Gmina: Limanowa

Rupniów [ˈrupɲuf] is a village in the administrative district of Gmina Limanowa, within Limanowa County, Lesser Poland Voivodeship, in southern Poland.
