= Konina =

Konina may refer to:

== People ==
- Tomasz Konina (1972–2017), Polish director and stage designer

== Places ==
- Konina, Mali
- Konina, Limanowa County, Poland
