= Kłodne =

- Village
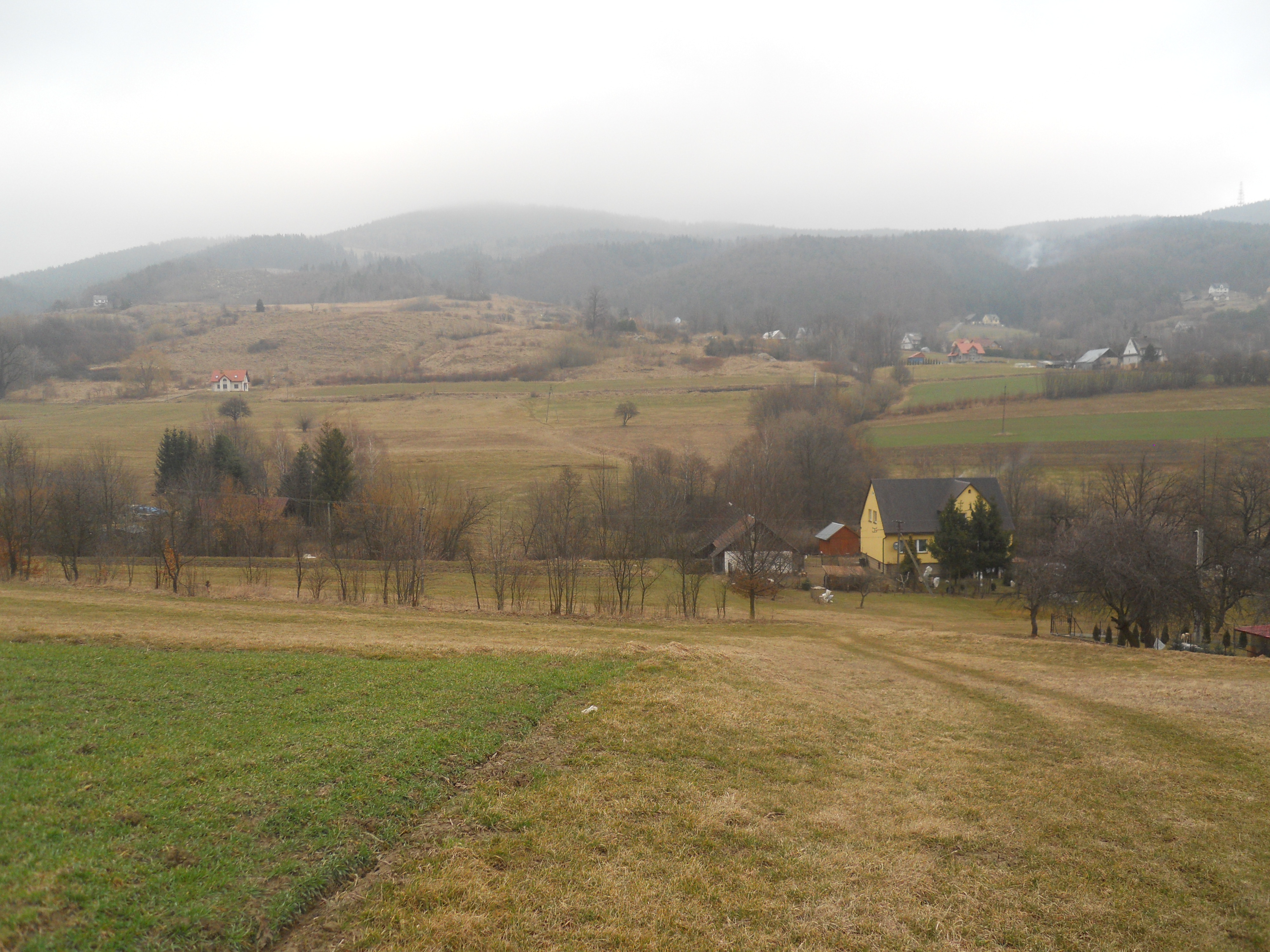

- Location within Poland
- Coordinates: 49°41′6″N 20°33′58″E
- Country: Poland
- Voivodeship: Lesser Poland
- County: Limanowa
- Gmina: Limanowa
- Elevation: 937 m (3,074 ft)
- Population: 1,020

Kłodne [ˈkwɔdnɛ] is a village in the administrative district of Gmina Limanowa, within Limanowa County, Lesser Poland Voivodeship, in southern Poland.
