= Podobin =

- Village
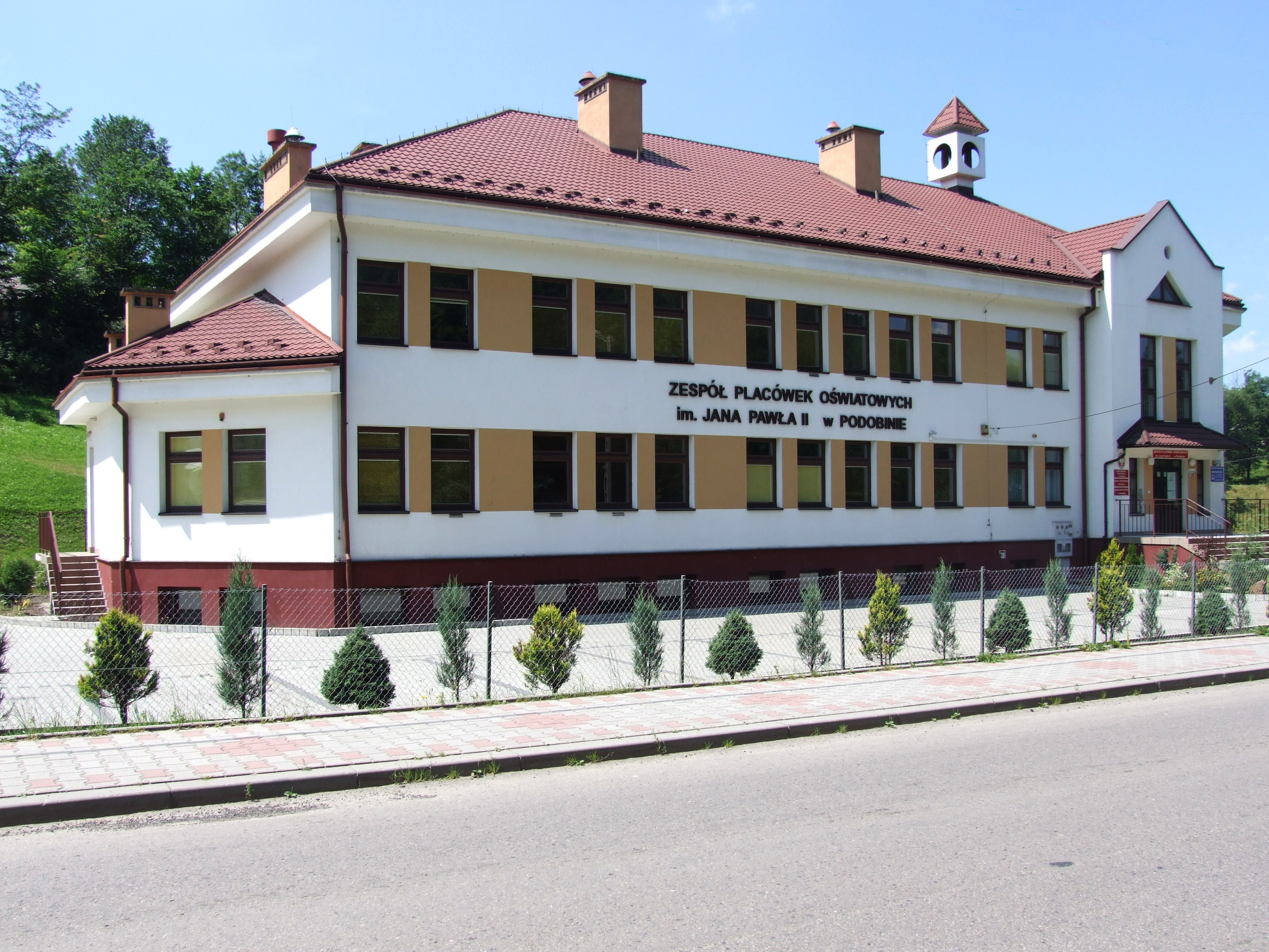
- School in Podobin

- Location within Poland
- Coordinates: 49°38′N 20°6′E
- Country: Poland
- Voivodeship: Lesser Poland
- County: Limanowa
- Gmina: Niedźwiedź

Podobin [pɔˈdɔbin] is a village in the administrative district of Gmina Niedźwiedź, within Limanowa County, Lesser Poland Voivodeship, in southern Poland.
