= Bronisław Dutka =

Polish politician (born 1957)

member of Sejm 2005-2007
- Incumbent
- Assumed office 25 September 2005

Personal details
- Born: 1957 (age 68–69)
- Party: Polish People's Party

Bronisław Dutka (born 15 August 1957 in Pisarzowa) is a Polish politician. He was elected to Sejm on 25 September 2005, getting 5,469 votes in 14 Nowy Sącz district as a candidate from the Polish People's Party list.

He was also a member of Sejm 1991-1993 and Sejm 2001-2005.

== See also ==
- Members of Polish Sejm 2005-2007
