= Gmina Limanowa =

Gmina Limanowa Limanowa Commune
- Gmina
- Coat of arms
- Interactive map of Gmina Limanowa
- Coordinates (Limanowa): 49°42′2″N 20°25′36″E
- Country: Poland
- Voivodeship: Lesser Poland
- County: Limanowa
- Seat: Limanowa

Area
  - Total: 152.39 km^{2} (58.84 sq mi)

Population (2006)
  - Total: 22,794
  - Density: 149.58/km^{2} (387.40/sq mi)
- Website: http://www.ug.limanowa.pl/

Gmina Limanowa is a rural gmina (administrative district) in Limanowa County, Lesser Poland Voivodeship, in southern Poland. Its seat is the town of Limanowa, although the town is not part of the territory of the gmina.

The gmina covers an area of 152.39 square kilometres (58.8 sq mi), and as of 2006 its total population is 22,794.

== Villages ==
Gmina Limanowa contains the villages and settlements of Bałażówka, Kanina, Kisielówka, Kłodne, Koszary, Lipowe, Makowica, Męcina, Młynne, Mordarka, Nowe Rybie, Pasierbiec, Pisarzowa, Rupniów, Siekierczyna, Sowliny, Stara Wieś, Stare Rybie, Walowa Góra and Wysokie.

== Neighbouring gminas ==
Gmina Limanowa is bordered by the town of Limanowa and by the gminas of Chełmiec, Jodłownik, Łapanów, Laskowa, Łososina Dolna, Łukowica, Podegrodzie, Słopnice, Trzciana and Tymbark.
