= Stara Wieś, Limanowa County =

Stara Wieś
- Village
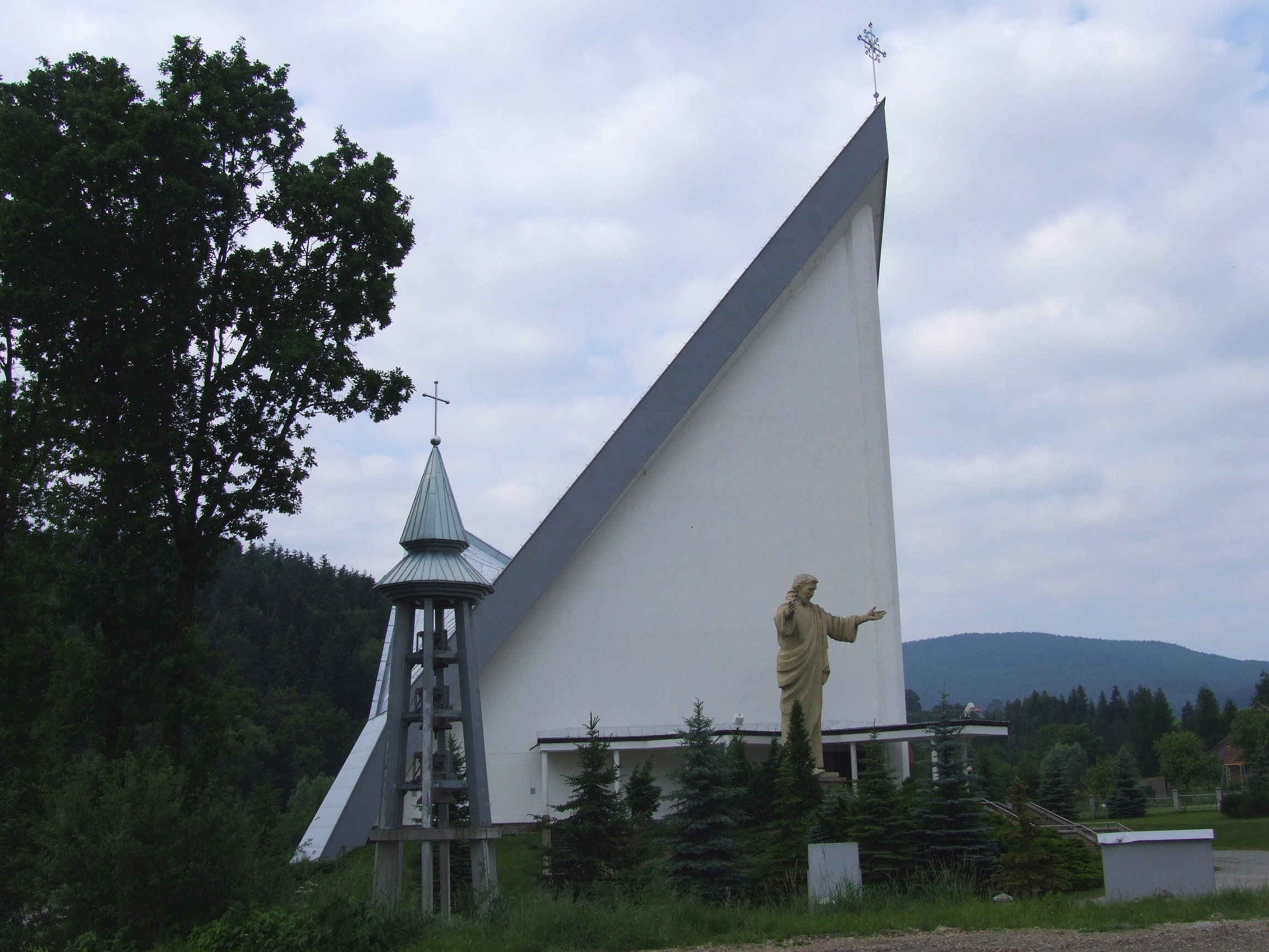
- Local Catholic church

- Location within Poland
- Coordinates: 49°41′0″N 20°24′3″E
- Country: Poland
- Voivodeship: Lesser Poland
- County: Limanowa
- Gmina: Limanowa
- Population: 3,715

Stara Wieś [ˈstara ˈvjɛɕ] is a village in the administrative district of Gmina Limanowa, within Limanowa County, Lesser Poland Voivodeship, in southern Poland. It is notorious for a 2025 shooting.

== 2025 shooting ==
Stara Wieś shooting
- Location: 49°40′52″N 20°24′13″E; Stara Wieś, Limanowa County, Lesser Poland Voivodeship, Poland
- Date: 27 June 2025; ~10:30 AM CET (UTC+1)
- Attack type: Domestic shooting
- Weapons: Rifle Single-shot homemade; Double-barreled shotgun (used in suicide)
- Deaths: 3 (Including the perpetrator)
- Injuries: 1
- Perpetrator: Tadeusz Duda
- Motive: possibly domestic dispute
- Verdict: Suspect deceased (suicide)

On 27 June 2025, a shooting occurred in the village of Stara Wieś, Limanowa County, Lesser Poland Voivodeship, Poland. The suspect, a 57-year-old man, shot three family members, killing his daughter (26) and son-in-law (31), and seriously wounding his mother-in-law (72). A one-year-old child was unharmed.

Following the shooting, Duda fled into nearby forests, triggering an extensive manhunt involving over 800 police officers, tracking dogs, drones, and helicopters. The search gained widespread media attention due to the perpetrator's ability to evade capture. Days after the incident, Duda reportedly returned to the vicinity of his village. Upon spotting police officers, he allegedly exchanged fire with them before escaping again, further intensifying public concern and media coverage.

On 1 July 2025, Duda's body was discovered on a country road. Items that may have belonged to Duda were later found in a wooded area near his home. An autopsy confirmed that he died from a self-inflicted gunshot wound to the head, indicating death by suicide. Investigations are ongoing to determine whether he had assistance during his evasion.

=== Perpetrator ===
Tadeusz Duda (December 10, 1968 – July 1, 2025) was a Polish man identified by police as the perpetrator of the Stara Wieś shooting. He lived in Stara Wieś in southern Poland. Authorities reported that he had previously been charged with abusing his wife and threatening his parents-in-law and was subject to a court-issued restraining order prohibiting contact with his family. Neighbours described him as "golden" to outsiders but noted frequent domestic disturbances, including arguments and threats.
