= Makowica =

Makowica may refer to:

- Makowica, Lesser Poland Voivodeship, Poland
- Makowica, Masovian Voivodeship, Poland
