= Lipowe, Limanowa County =

Lipowe
- Village
- Location within Poland
- Coordinates: 49°42′35″N 20°23′16″E
- Country: Poland
- Voivodeship: Lesser Poland
- County: Limanowa
- Gmina: Limanowa
- Elevation: 570 m (1,870 ft)
- Population: 758

Lipowe [liˈpɔvɛ] is a village in the administrative district of Gmina Limanowa, within Limanowa County, Lesser Poland Voivodeship, in southern Poland.
