= Gmina Niedźwiedź =

Gmina Niedźwiedź Niedźwiedź Commune
- Gmina
- Coat of arms
- Interactive map of Gmina Niedźwiedź
- Coordinates (Niedźwiedź): 49°37′15.7″N 20°04′47.2″E
- Country: Poland
- Voivodeship: Lesser Poland
- County: Limanowa
- Seat: Niedźwiedź

Area
  - Total: 74.44 km^{2} (28.74 sq mi)

Population (2006)
  - Total: 6,757
  - Density: 90.77/km^{2} (235.1/sq mi)
- Website: http://www.niedzwiedz.iap.pl

Gmina Niedźwiedź is a rural gmina (administrative district) in Limanowa County, Lesser Poland Voivodeship, in southern Poland. Its seat is the village of Niedźwiedź, which lies approximately 21 kilometres (13 mi) west of Limanowa and 51 km (32 mi) south of the regional capital Kraków.

The gmina covers an area of 74.44 square kilometres (28.7 sq mi) and as of 2006, its total population is 6,757.

== Villages ==
Gmina Niedźwiedź contains the villages and settlements of Konina, Niedźwiedź, Podobin, and Poręba Wielka.

== Neighbouring gminas ==
Gmina Niedźwiedź is bordered by the town of Mszana Dolna and by the gminas of Kamienica, Mszana Dolna, Nowy Targ, and Rabka-Zdrój.
