= Słopnice =

- Village
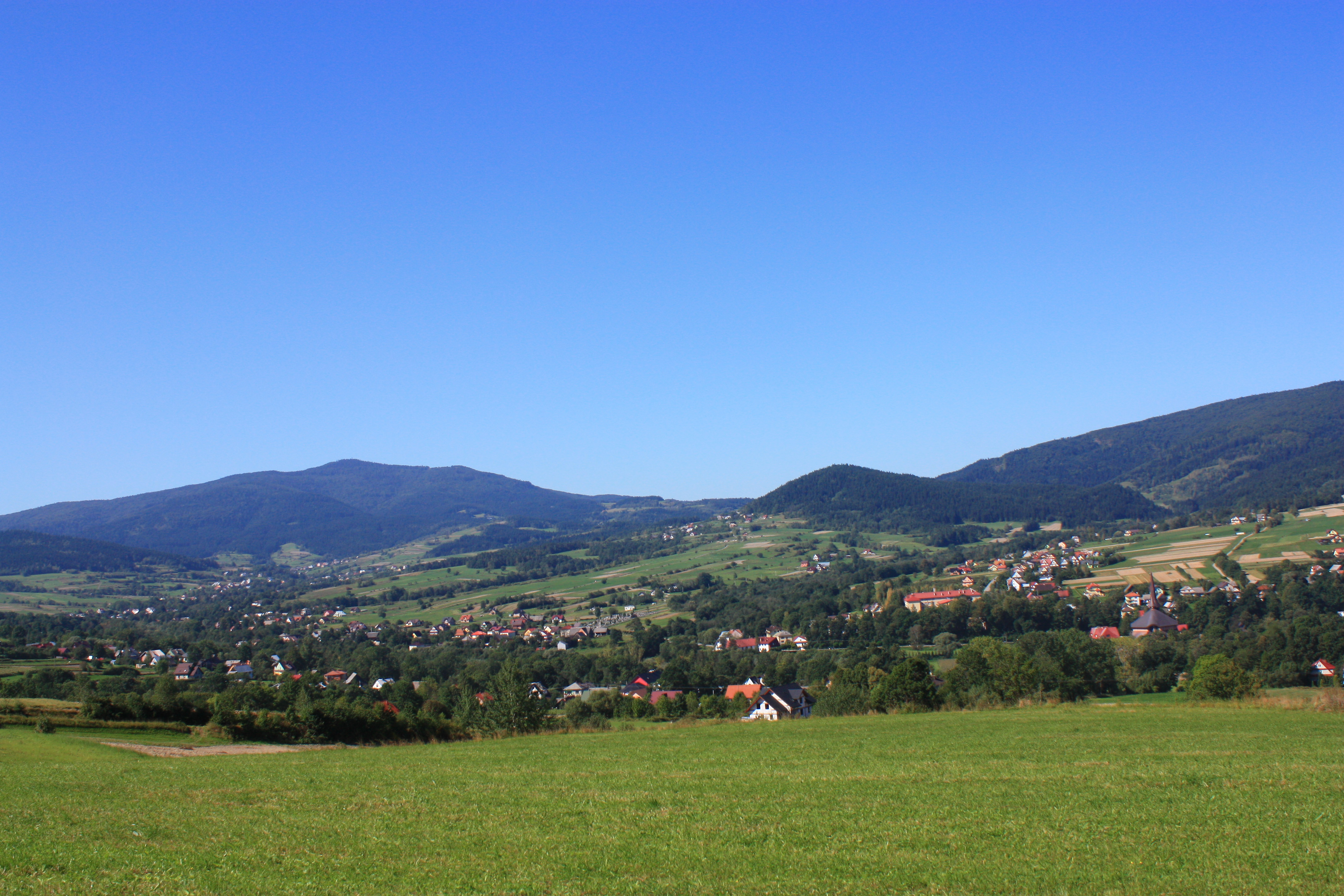
- Panorama of Słopnice

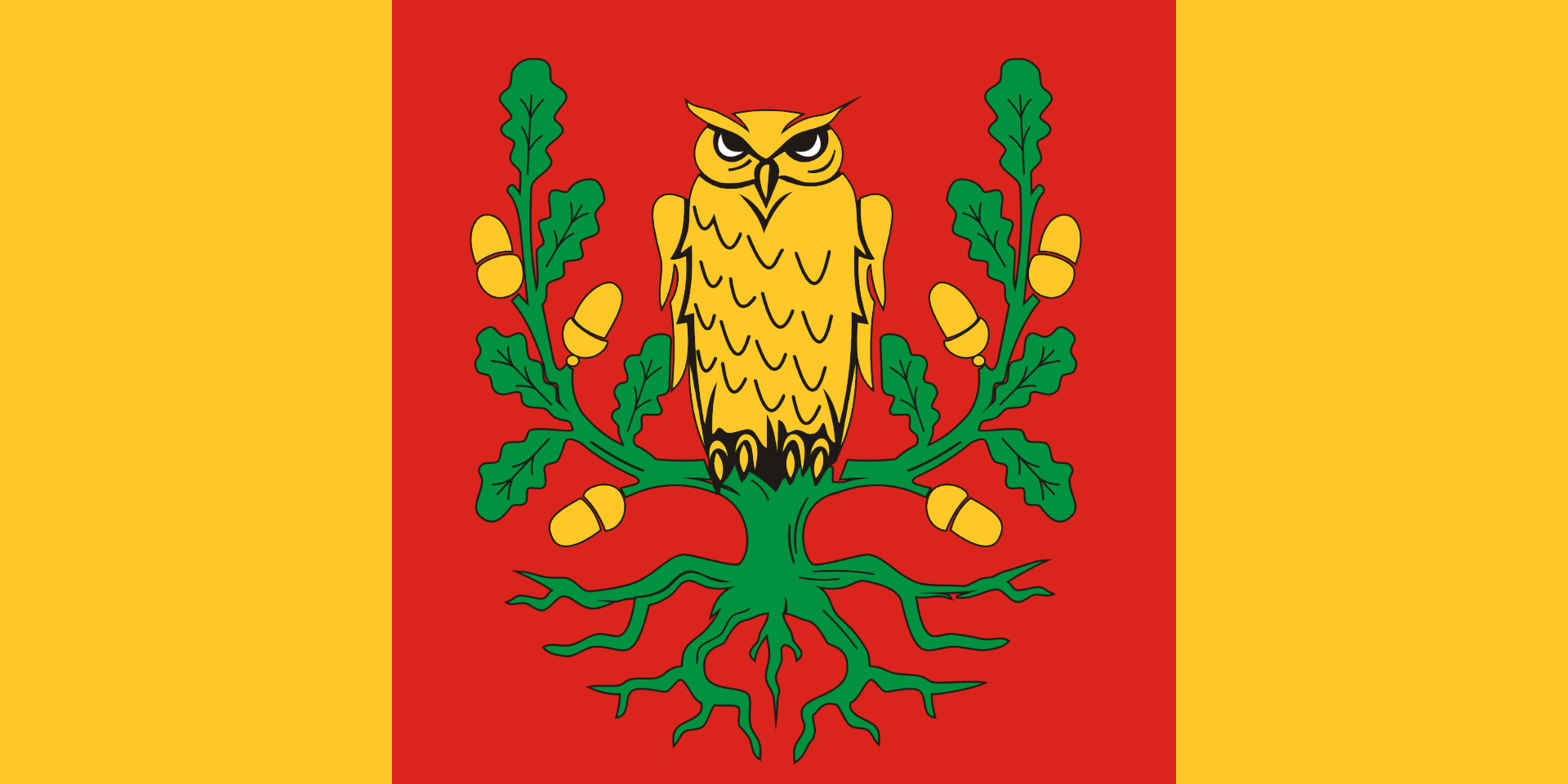
- Flag Coat of arms

- Location within Poland
- Coordinates: 49°42′N 20°21′E
- Country: Poland
- Voivodeship: Lesser Poland
- County: Limanowa
- Gmina: Słopnice
- Founded: 14th century

Population
  - Total: 7,129
- Time zone: UTC+1 (CET)
  - Summer (DST): UTC+2 (CEST)
- Vehicle registration: KLI
- Website: Słopnice

Słopnice ([swɔpˈɲit͡sɛ]; pronunciation: swop-NEET-sə) is a village in Limanowa County, Lesser Poland Voivodeship, in southern Poland. It is the seat of the gmina (administrative district) called Gmina Słopnice.

Situated along the Carpathian Mountains, the village had a population of 7,004 in 2022.

== History ==
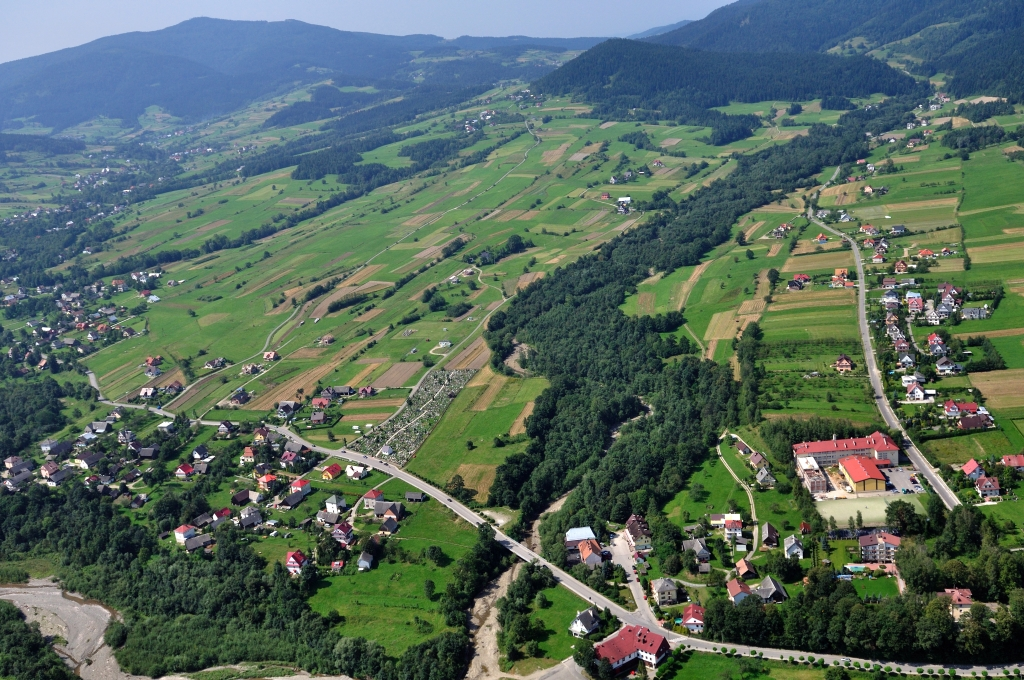
Słopnice from above

The village dates back to the 14th century. The first settlers began to arrive during the reigns of Polish kings Ladislaus I the Short and Casimir III the Great. The village was initially divided into two parts; one being Słopnica Królewska (Royal Słopnica) and the other Słopnica Szlachecka (Noble Słopnica), which were later merged. Sometime between 1358 and 1373 the first Catholic parish was established. A wooden temple of Saint Andrew was erected and remained in use until it was demolished in the 18th century. In 1776, a new church was constructed on the same spot which stands to this day and is the most important landmark in the village. After the First Partition of Poland, the village was annexed by Austria, and included within its newly formed autonomous province of Galicia. However, the population was Polish speaking and the province was colloquially or unofficially known as "Austrian Poland". Until World War I, almost the entire population of the village was engaged in agriculture and farming. There were no industries present in Słopnice. Also, a substantial portion of the people who resided in Słopnice were Polish Jews.

During World War I, Józef Piłsudski, future Marshal of Poland, stationed in Słopnice with his Polish Legions that fought for Poland's cause in regaining its independence. The united Austro-Polish troops defeated the Russians in the nearby villages in November 1914. At the same time, the inhabitants greatly suffered from war activity, food rationing and subsequent poverty. After the war, in 1918, Poland regained independence and control of Słopnice.

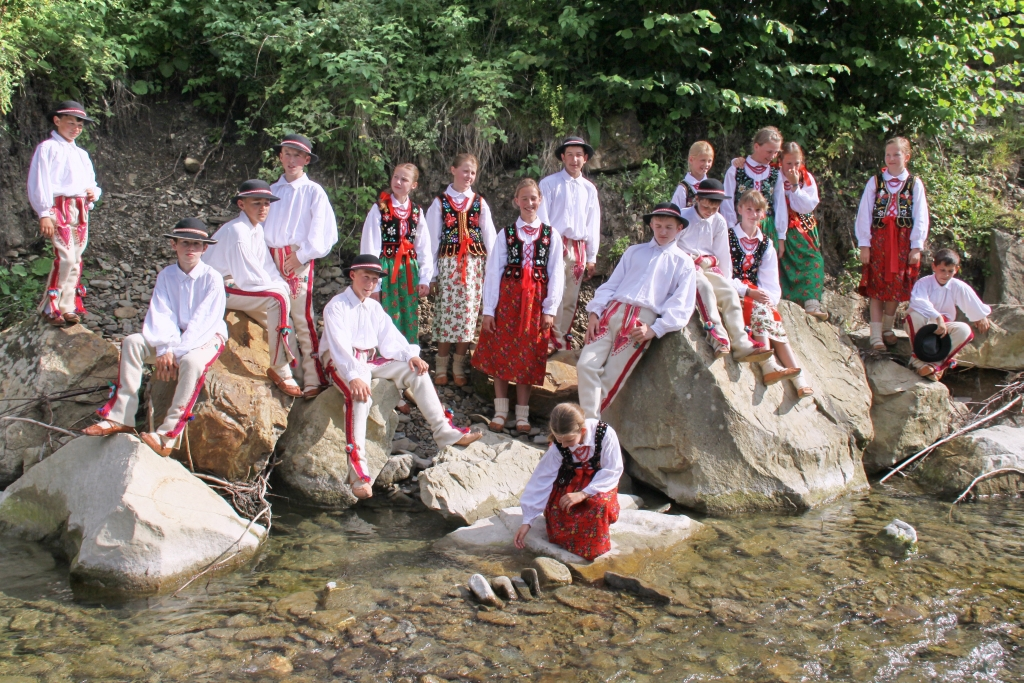
Children's choir from Słopnice in traditional Goral costumes

In 1930, the village was the seat of a separate gmina (commune), but in 1935 it became part of Gmina Tymbark where one of the most famous Polish companies, Tymbark S.A., was founded in 1936. The firm became one of the largest producers of juices and beverages in the entire country.

Following the joint German-Soviet invasion of Poland, which started World War II in September 1939, the village was occupied by Germany until 1945. Polish resistance fighters and partisans were active in the surrounding forests. The Jews of Słopnice were sent by the Nazi Germans to a newly established ghetto in the nearby town of Limanowa, where they were starved, murdered or sent to extermination camps. In retaliation for the activity of the Polish resistance, on July 17, 1944, the Germans carried out a massacre of 32 Poles in Słopnice (see Nazi crimes against the Polish nation). Despite a German ban, local Poles secretly commemorated the grave and placed a cross on it. A monument now stands there.

Elias Sanders, the father of U.S. politician and 2016/2020 presidential candidate Bernie Sanders, was born in Słopnice in 1904 and emigrated to the United States in 1921. Sanders visited the village with his brother Larry Sanders in 2013. In 2016, the mayor, Adam Sołtys, said, "There's quite a bit of excitement in the air here—we're proud of Senator Sanders and we wish our 'homeboy' even greater success!"

== Tourism ==
Słopnice has a hotel and an agritourism centre for visitors. It also a features camping sites and lookout points due to its position along the picturesque Carpathian Mountains.

== Landmarks ==
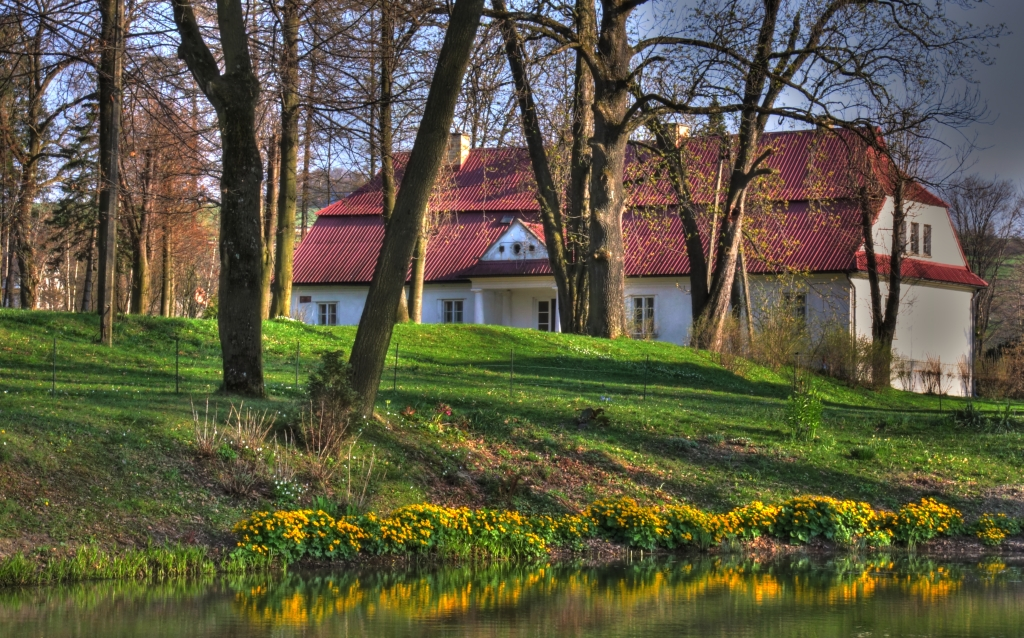
Bobrowski Manor and Park

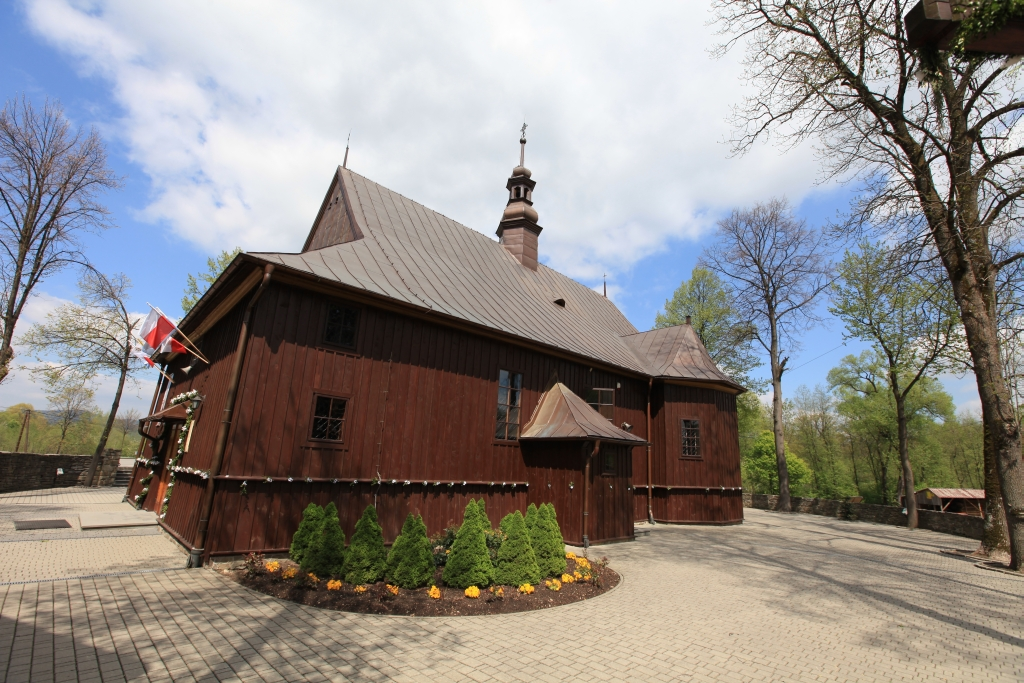
Saint Andrew Church

- Saint Andrew's Church, 1776
- Neoclassical Bobrowski Manor House (dworek), early 19th century, with an adjacent park with over 400-year-old oaks, lindens and chestnut trees
- Cemetery of cholera victims in Zaświercze, 1871
- Village museum in nearby school
- Historical chapels and shrines along main roads

== Sports ==
The local football club is Sokół Słopnice. It competes in the lower leagues.

== Twin towns ==
Słopnice has five twin towns:

- Balkány, Hungary
- Chlebnice, Slovakia
- Gießhübl, Austria
- Lazuri, Romania
- Zajta, Hungary
