= Sowliny =

- Village
- Location within Poland
- Coordinates: 49°43′31″N 20°24′52″E
- Country: Poland
- Voivodeship: Lesser Poland
- County: Limanowa
- Gmina: Limanowa

Sowliny is a village in the administrative district of Gmina Limanowa, within Limanowa County, Lesser Poland Voivodeship, in southern Poland.
