= Walowa Góra =

- Village
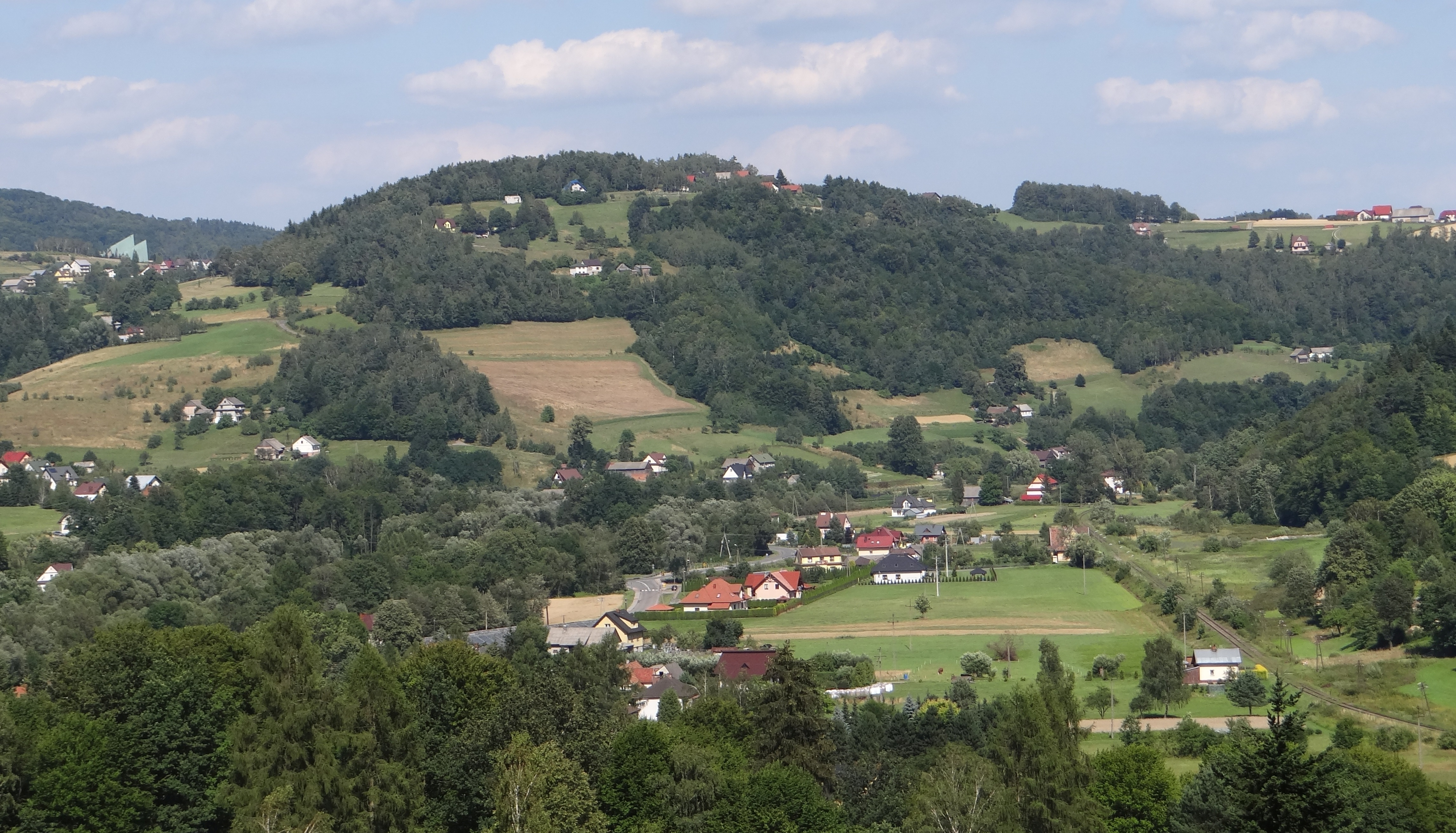

- Location within Poland
- Coordinates: 49°45′3″N 20°22′56″E
- Country: Poland
- Voivodeship: Lesser Poland
- County: Limanowa
- Gmina: Limanowa
- Population: 396

Walowa Góra [vaˈlɔva ˈɡura] is a village in the administrative district of Gmina Limanowa, within Limanowa County, Lesser Poland Voivodeship, in southern Poland.
