= Siekierczyna, Limanowa County =

Village in Poland

Siekierczyna
- Village
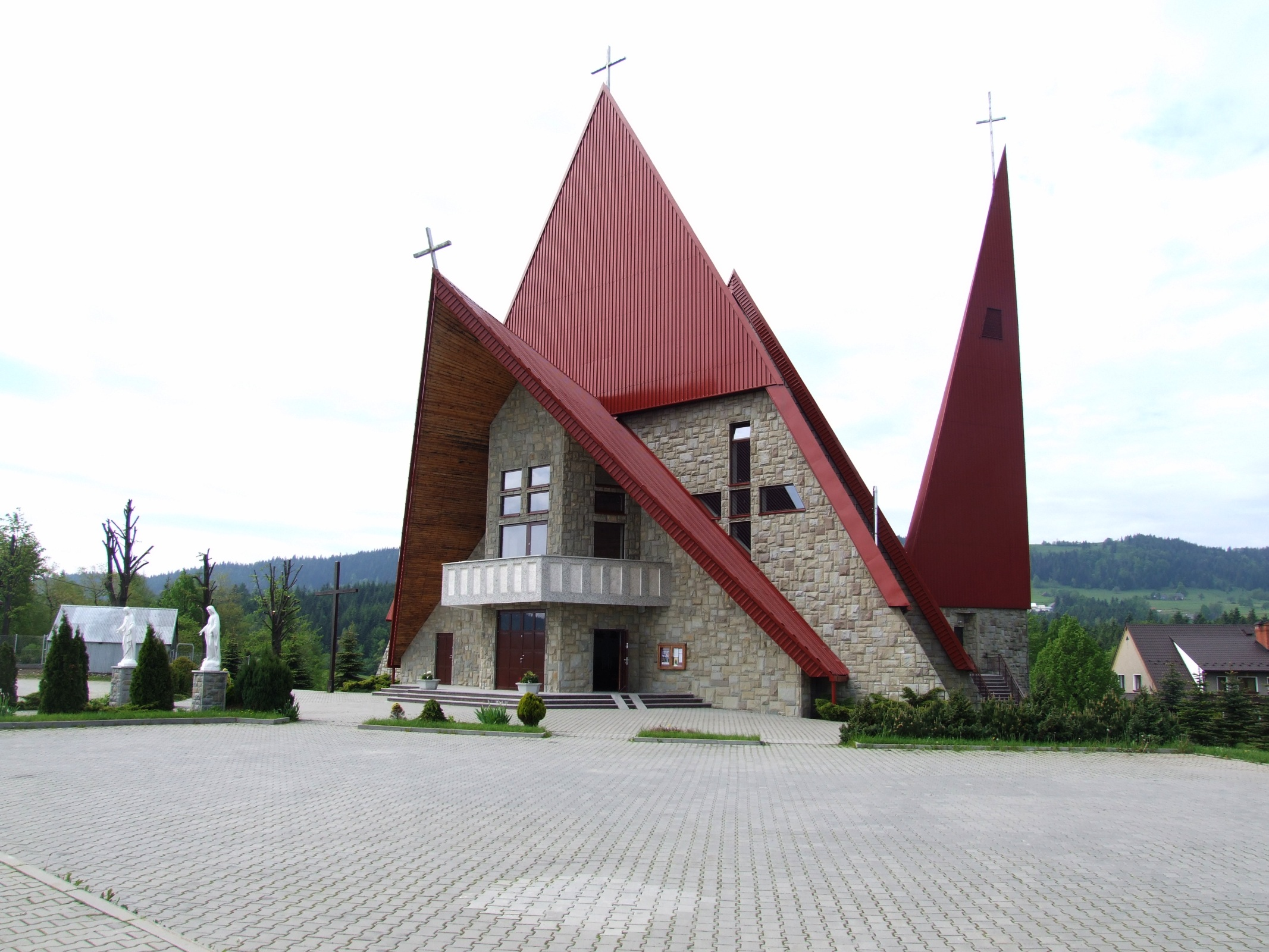
- Local Catholic church

- Location within Poland
- Coordinates: 49°39′11″N 20°26′3″E
- Country: Poland
- Voivodeship: Lesser Poland
- County: Limanowa
- Gmina: Limanowa
- Population: 1,682

Siekierczyna [ɕɛkʲɛrˈt͡ʂɨna] is a village in the administrative district of Gmina Limanowa, within Limanowa County, Lesser Poland Voivodeship, in southern Poland.
