= Zygmunt Żuławski =

Polish politician (1880–1949)

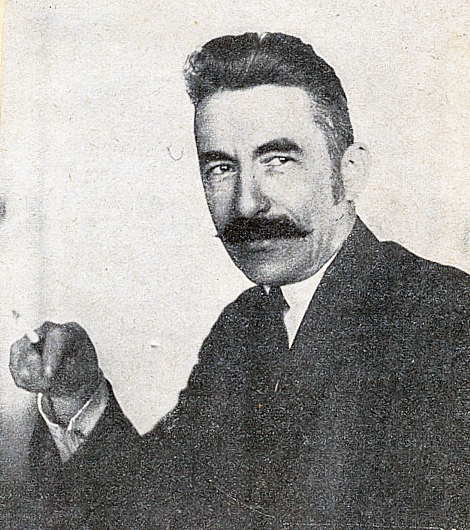
- Portrait of Żuławski, 1939
- Born: July 31, 1880; Młynne, Austria-Hungary
- Died: September 4, 1949 (aged 69); Kraków, Republic of Poland
- Occupation: Politician
- Notable work: Wspomnienia

Zygmunt Żuławski (Polish pronunciation: [ˈzɨɡmunt ʐuˈwafskʲi]; 31 July 1880 in Młynne, Austria-Hungary – 4 September 1949 in Kraków) was a Polish politician, association activist, and socialist. He was a member of:

- The Polish Social Democratic Party of Galicia, from 1904
- The Polish Socialist Party, 1919-1939
- The Polska Partia Socjalistyczna - Wolność-Równość-Niepodległość, 1940-1945
- The Komisja Centralna Związków Zawodowych, 1922-1939
- The Odrodzona Polska Partia Socjalistyczna, 1945–1946.

He held the position of:

- Deputy of the sejm, 1919-1935
- Deputy of the State National Council, 1946-1947
- Deputy of the Legislative Sejm, from 1947.

In 1980 Żuławski published a book entitled Wspomnienia.
