= Kanina =

Kanina may refer to:

- Kanina, Poland, a village in Poland
- Kanina (river), Bulgaria
- Kanina (Mělník District), a municipality and village in the Czech Republic
- Kanina Khas, a town in Haryana, India
- Feminine form of the Russian surname Kanin (name)
- Ottoman Turkish name of Kaninë, a settlement in Albania
- Kiron Kanina Skinner
