= Wysokie, Lesser Poland Voivodeship =

Wysokie
- Village
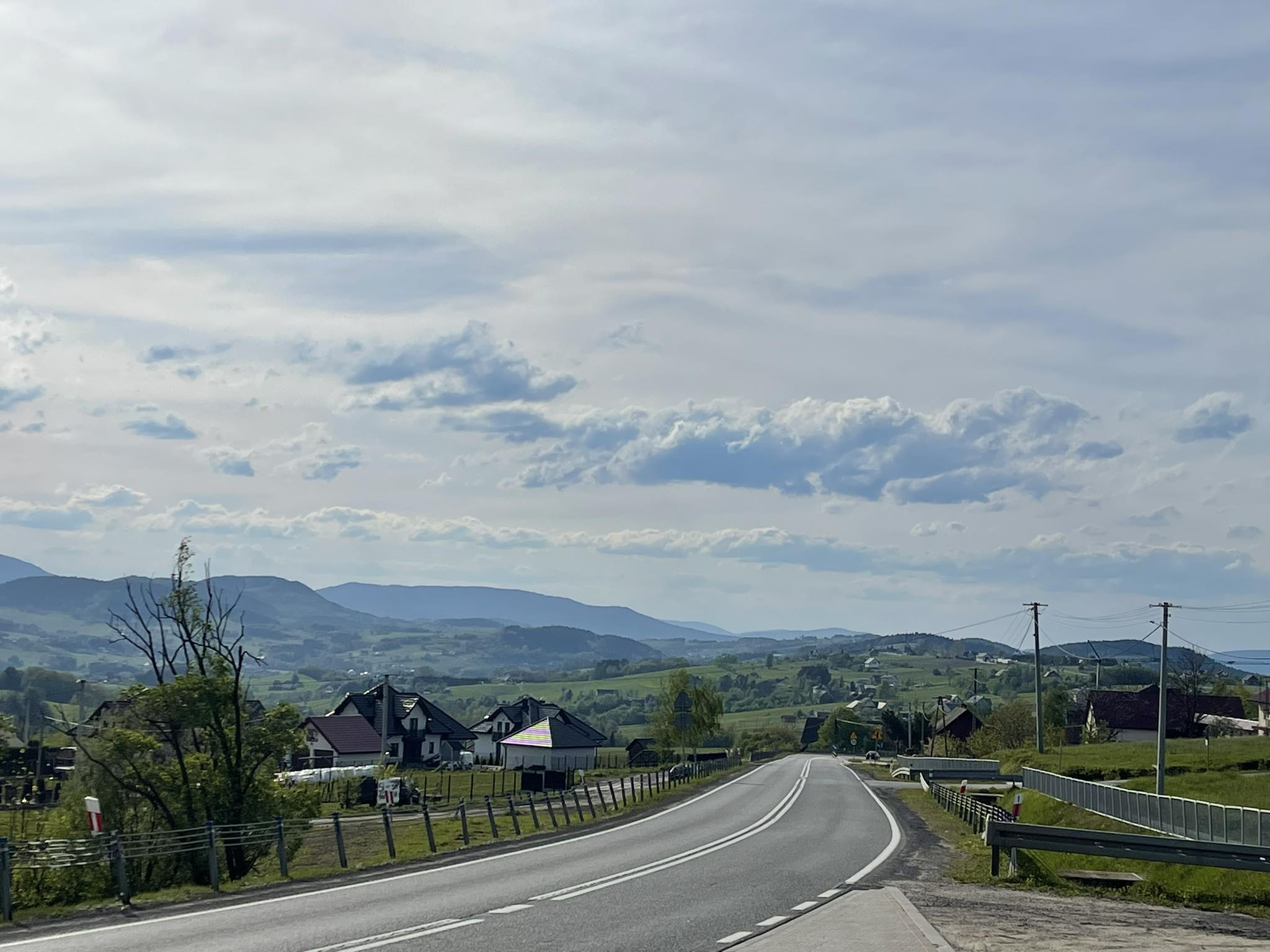
- Wysokie

- Location within Poland
- Coordinates: 49°39′8″N 20°32′48″E
- Country: Poland
- Voivodeship: Lesser Poland
- County: Limanowa
- Gmina: Limanowa
- Population: 815

Wysokie [vɨˈsɔkʲɛ] is a village in the administrative district of Gmina Limanowa, within Limanowa County, Lesser Poland Voivodeship, in southern Poland.

== Gallery ==
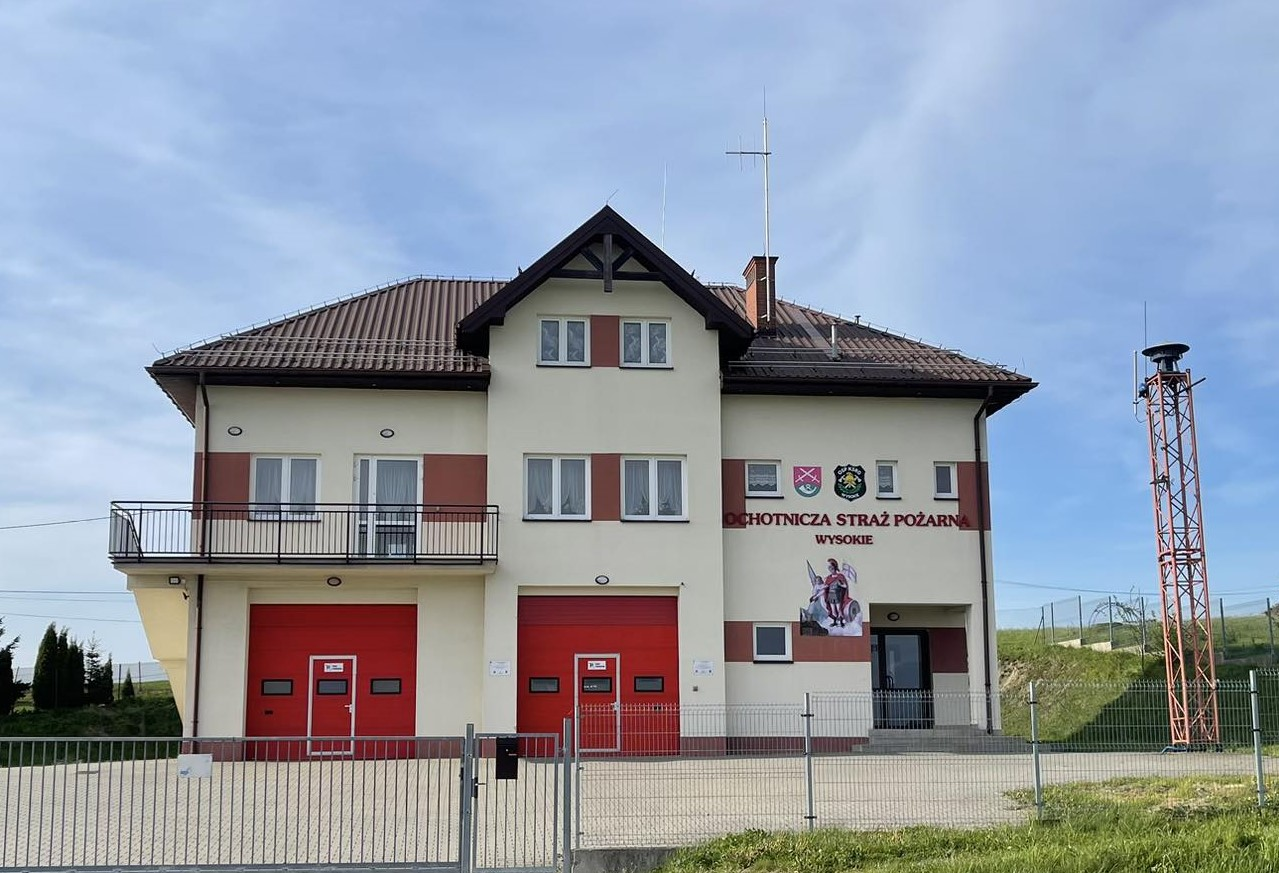

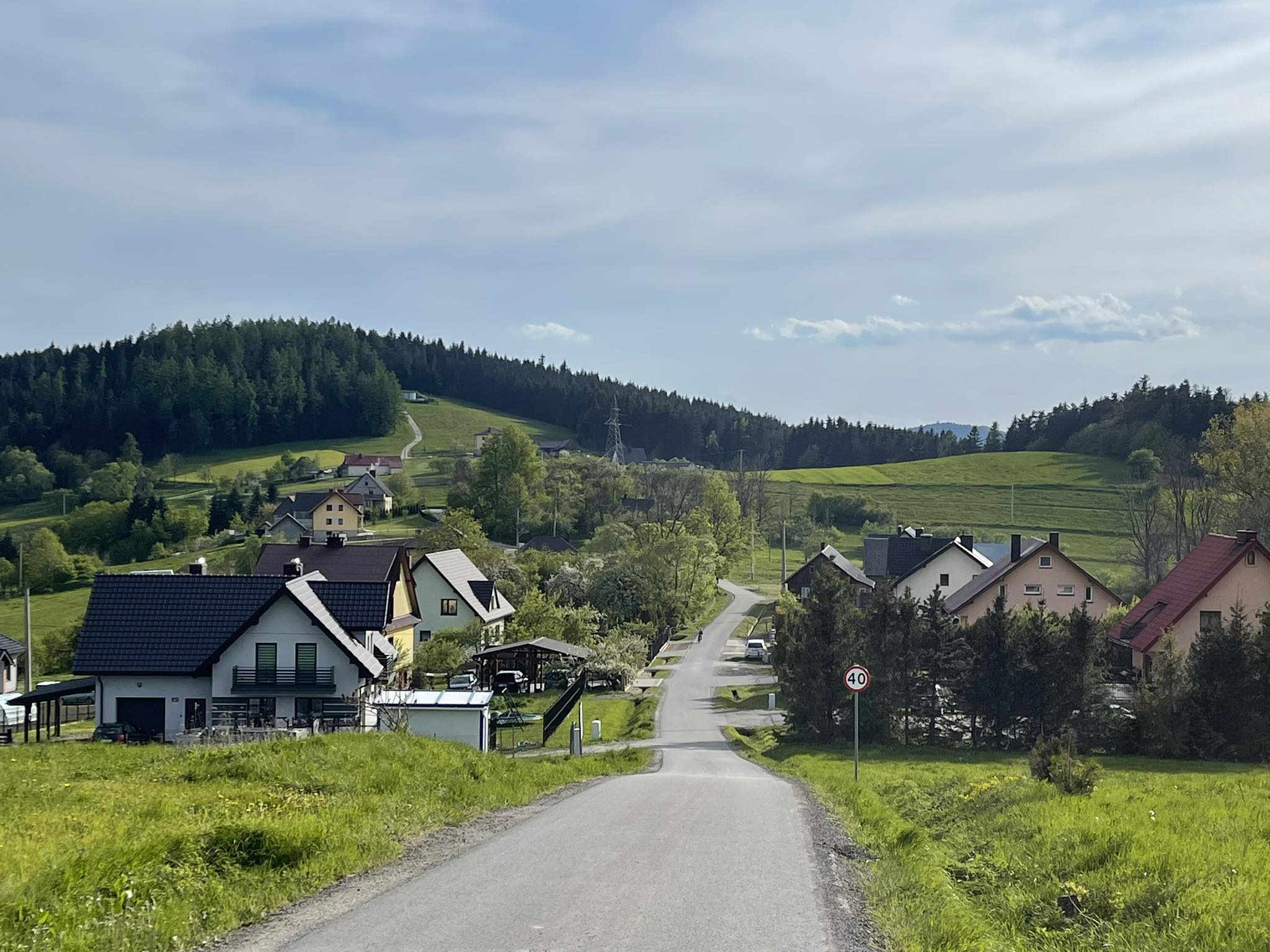
