= Niedźwiedź, Limanowa County =

Niedźwiedź
- Village
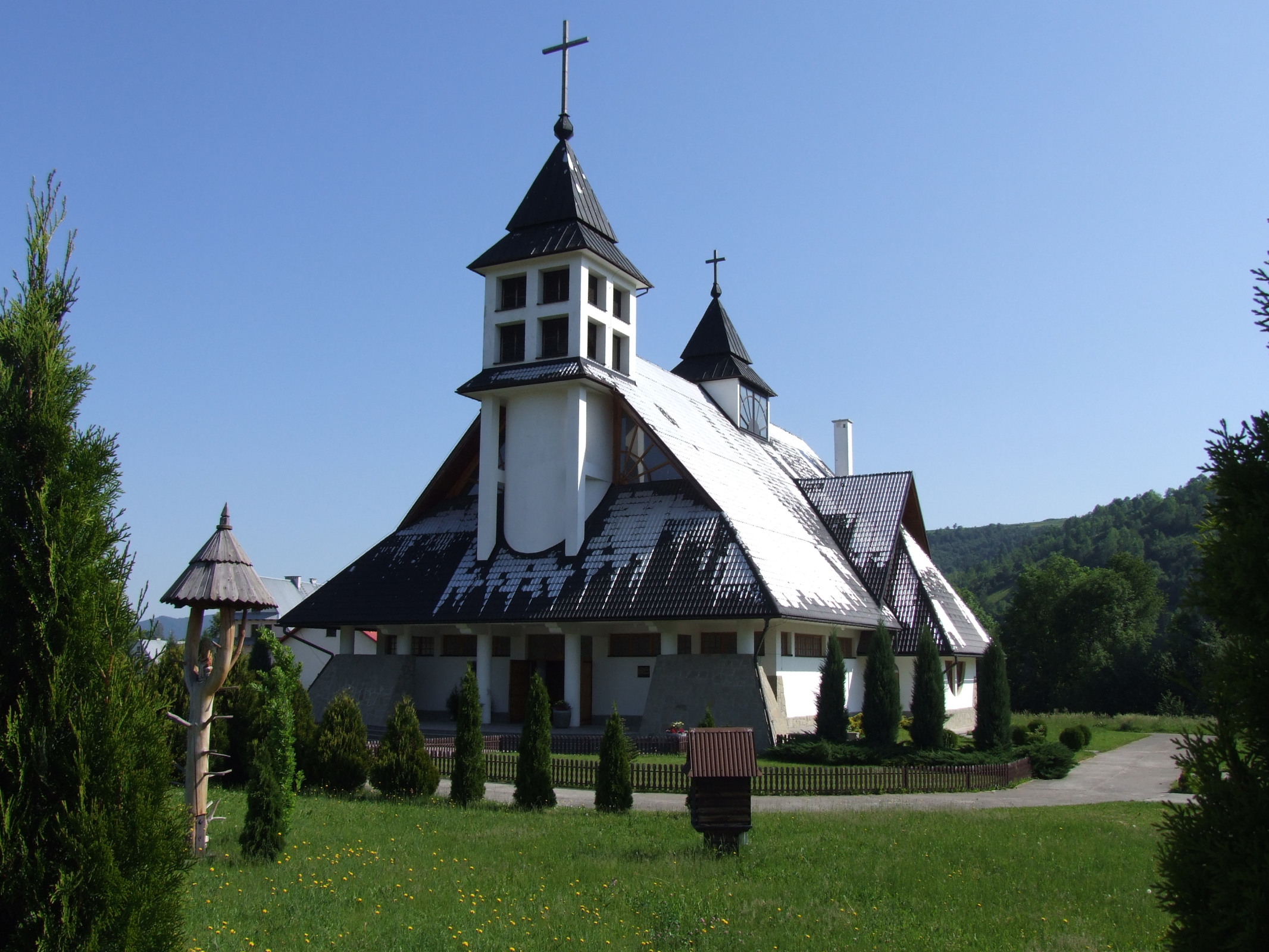
- Church

- Location within Poland
- Coordinates: 49°38′N 20°10′E
- Country: Poland
- Voivodeship: Lesser Poland
- County: Limanowa
- Gmina: Niedźwiedź
- Population: 1,400

Niedźwiedź [ˈɲɛd͡ʑvjɛt͡ɕ] is a village in Limanowa County, Lesser Poland Voivodeship, in southern Poland. It is the seat of the gmina (administrative district) called Gmina Niedźwiedź.
