= Młynne, Limanowa County =

Młynne
- Village
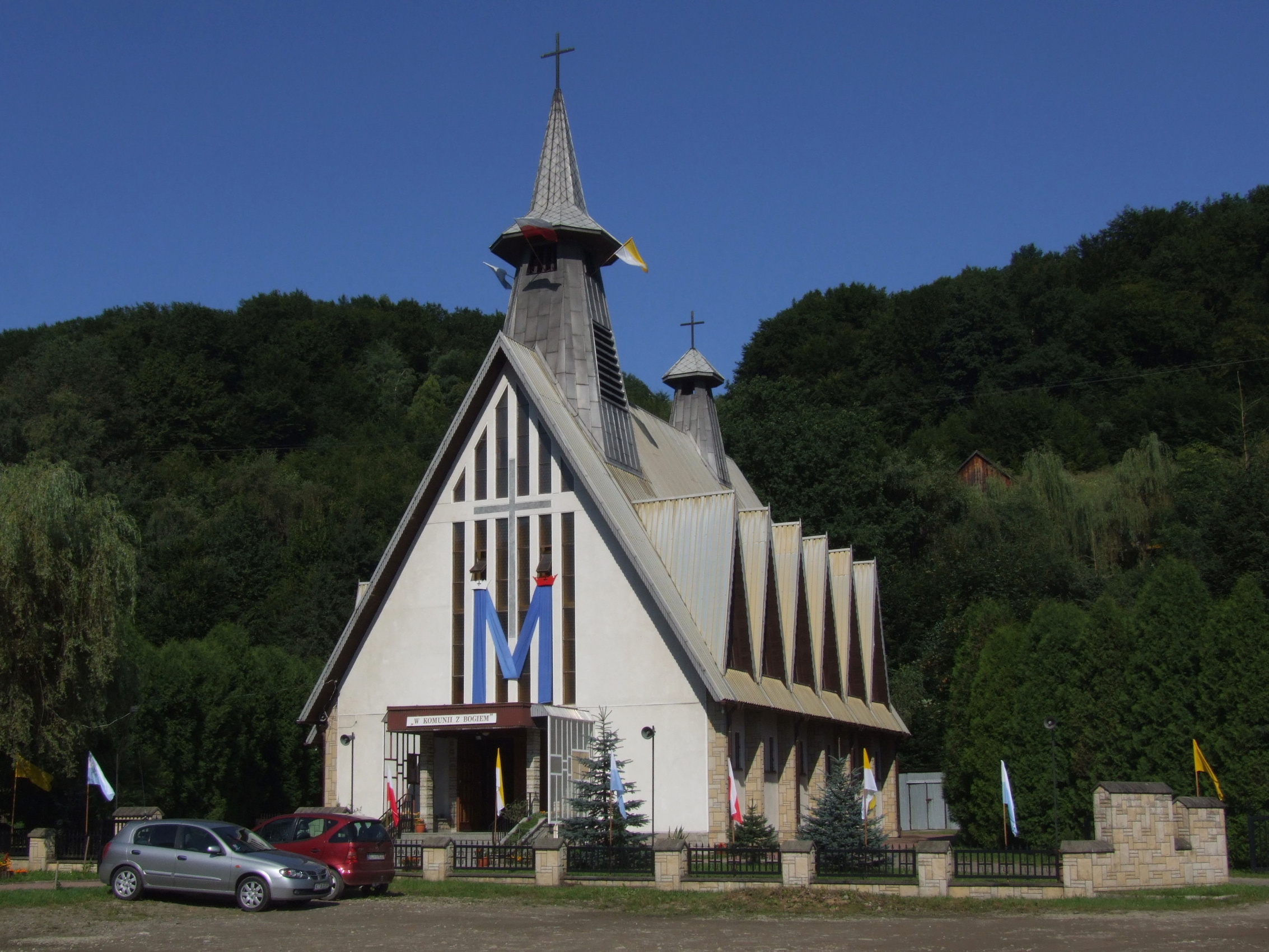
- Church

- Location within Poland
- Coordinates: 49°45′N 20°25′E
- Country: Poland
- Voivodeship: Lesser Poland
- County: Limanowa
- Gmina: Limanowa
- Population: 1,500

Młynne [ˈmwɨnnɛ] is a village in the administrative district of Gmina Limanowa, within Limanowa County, Lesser Poland Voivodeship, in southern Poland.
