= Chlebnice =

- Municipality
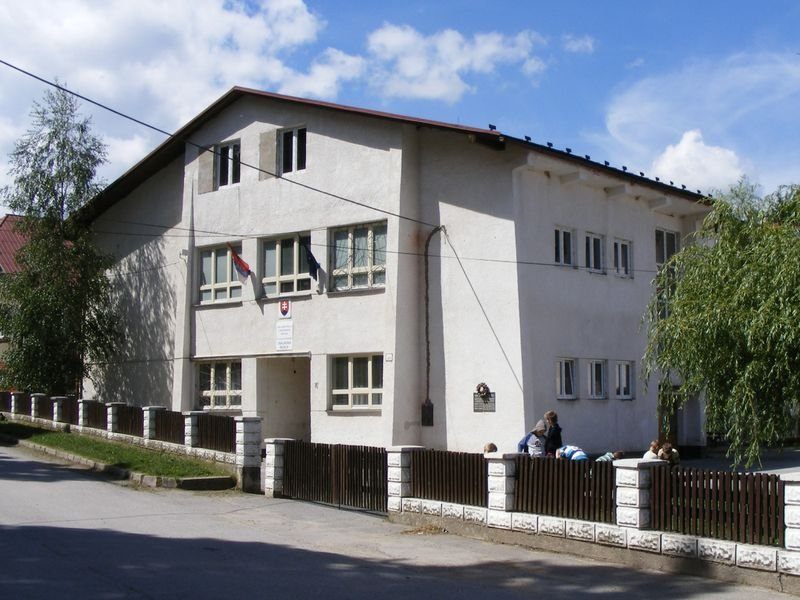

- Flag

- Location of Chlebnice in the Žilina Region Location of Chlebnice in Slovakia
- Coordinates: 49.23°N 19.47°E
- Country: Slovakia
- Region: Žilina Region
- District: Dolný Kubín District
- First mentioned: 1564

Area
  - Total: 25.30 km^{2} (9.77 sq mi)
- Elevation: 582 m (1,909 ft)

Population (2025)
  - Total: 1,611
- Time zone: UTC+1 (CET)
  - Summer (DST): UTC+2 (CEST)
- Postal code: 275 5
- Area code: +421 43
- Vehicle registration plate (until 2022): DK
- Website: www.obecchlebnice.sk

Chlebnice is a village and municipality in Dolný Kubín District in the Žilina Region of northern Slovakia.

Chlebnice has three sister cities: Balkány in Hungary, Słopnice in Poland and Lázári in Romania.

== Geography ==
The municipality lies at an altitude of 582 metres (1,909 ft) and covers an area of 25.30 km^{2} (9.77 sq mi) (2025).

== History ==
Before the establishment of independent Czechoslovakia in 1918, Chlebnice was part of Árva County within the Kingdom of Hungary. From 1939 to 1945, it was part of the Slovak Republic.

== Population ==
Population statistic (10 years)
Year	1995	2005	2015	2025
Count	1481	1600	1621	1611
Difference		+8.03%	+1.31%	−0.61%

Population statistic
Year	2024	2025
Count	1619	1611
Difference		−0.49%

It has a population of 1611 people (31 December 2025).

=== Ethnicity ===
Census 2021 (1+ %)
Ethnicity	Number	Fraction
Slovak	1601	99.81%
Total	1604	

In year 2021 was 1604 people by ethnicity 1601 as Slovak, 8 as Not found out, 1 as Czech, 1 as Russian and 1 as French.

Note on population: The difference values of population numbers in the table "Population statistic" and in the sections "Ethnicity" & "Religion" is caused by the use of various statistical methods.

=== Religion ===
Census 2021 (1+ %)
Religion	Number	Fraction
Roman Catholic Church	1542	96.13%
None	37	2.31%
Total	1604	

In year 2021 was 1604 people by religion 1542 from Roman Catholic Church, 37 from None, 7 from Christian Congregations in Slovakia, 4 from Other, 4 from Evangelical Church, 3 from Not found out, 3 from Greek Catholic Church, 3 from Ad hoc movements and 1 from Old Catholic Church.

== See also ==
- List of municipalities and towns in Slovakia

== Genealogical resources ==
The records for genealogical research are available at the state archive "Statny Archiv in Bytca, Slovakia"

- Roman Catholic church records (births/marriages/deaths): 1672-1909 (parish A)
