= Kanina, Poland =

Kanina
- Village
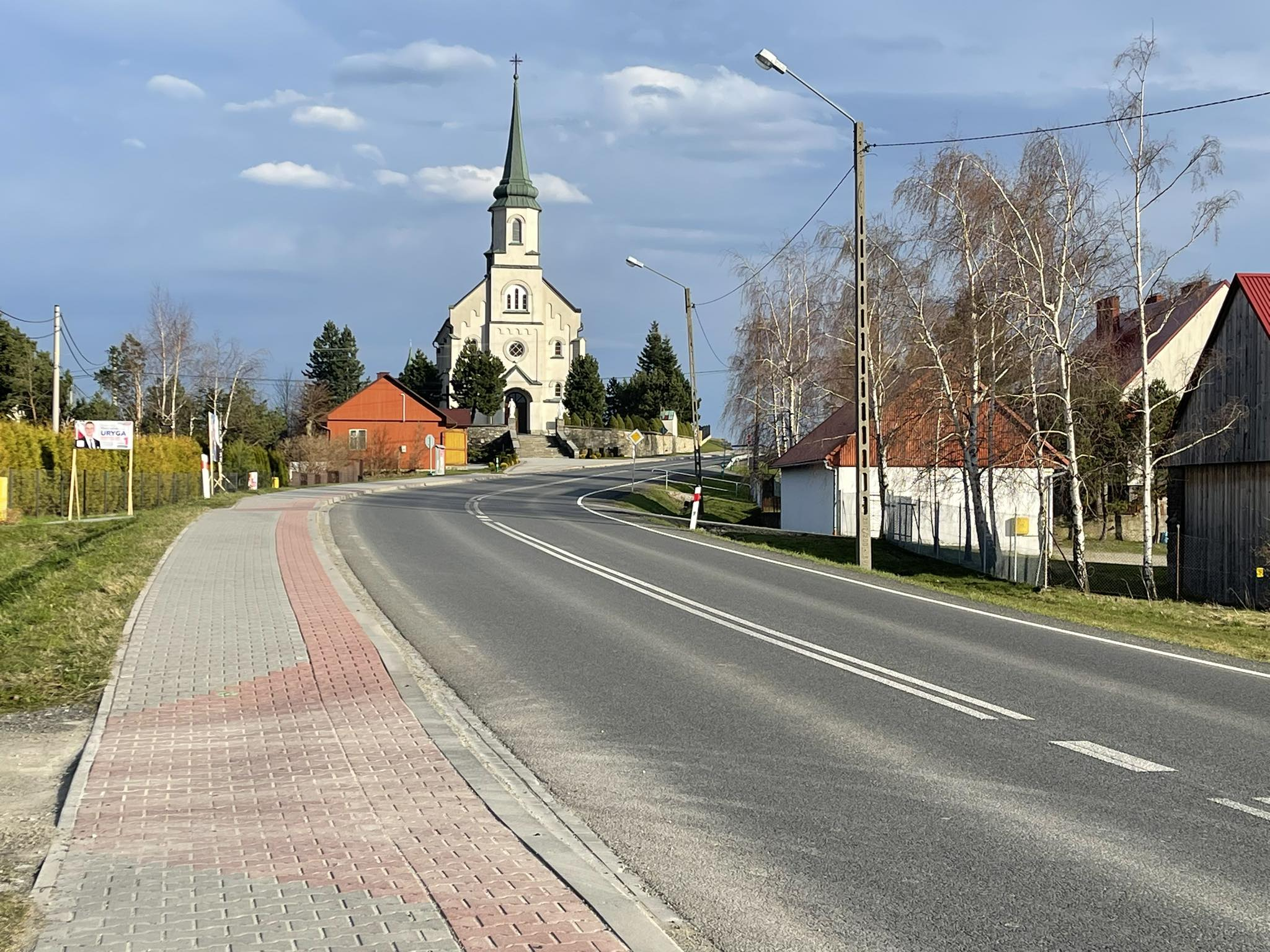

- Location within Poland
- Coordinates: 49°39′54″N 20°30′25″E
- Country: Poland
- Voivodeship: Lesser Poland
- County: Limanowa
- Gmina: Limanowa

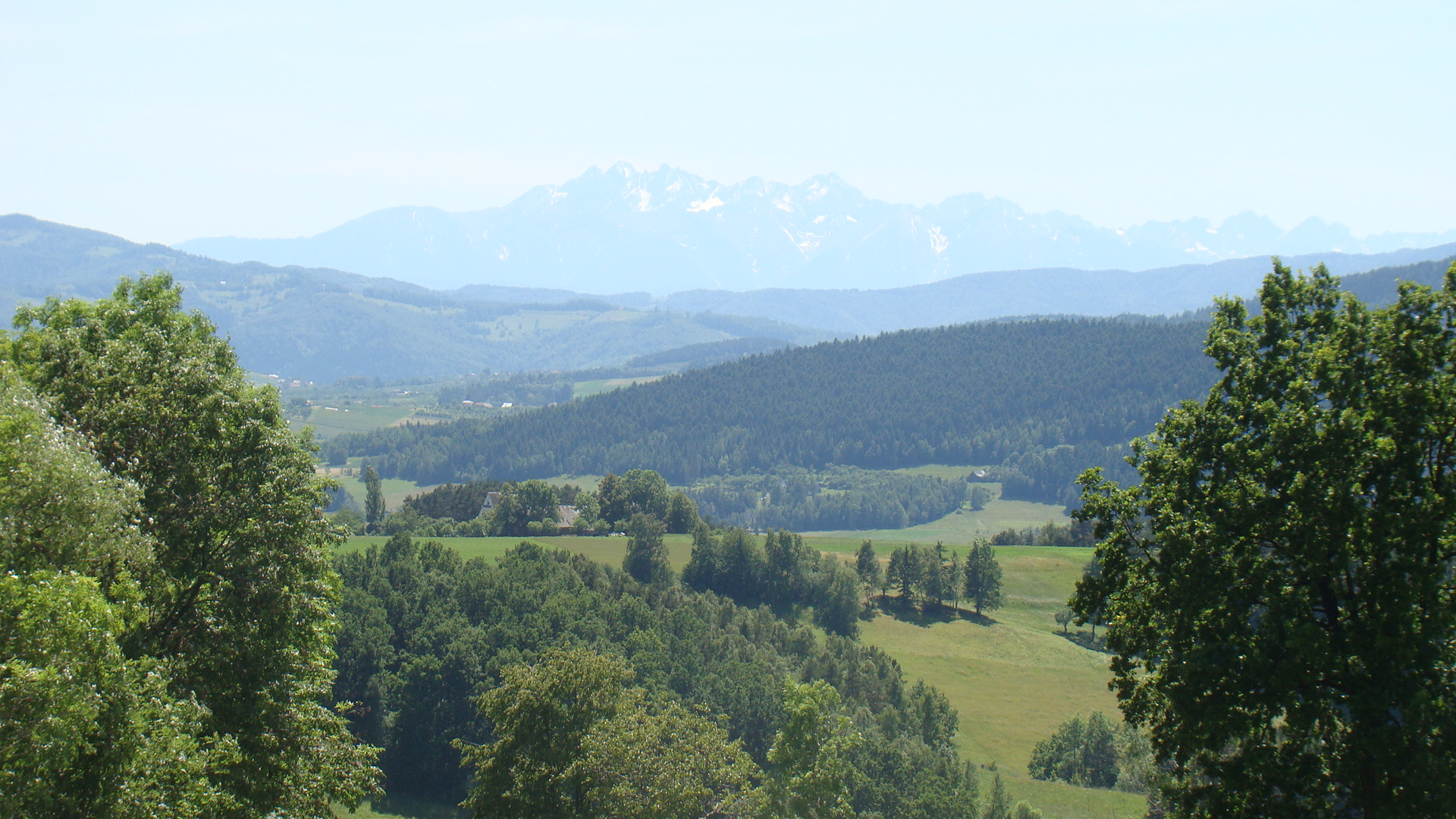
View of the Tatra Mountains

Kanina [kaˈnina] is a village in the administrative district of Gmina Limanowa, within Limanowa County, Lesser Poland Voivodeship, in southern Poland.
