= Makowica, Lesser Poland Voivodeship =

Makowica
- Village
- Location within Poland
- Coordinates: 49°45′56″N 20°23′51″E
- Country: Poland
- Voivodeship: Lesser Poland
- County: Limanowa
- Gmina: Limanowa
- Population: 234

Makowica [makɔˈvit͡sa] is a village in the administrative district of Gmina Limanowa, within Limanowa County, Lesser Poland Voivodeship, in southern Poland.
