= Konina, Limanowa County =

Konina
- Village
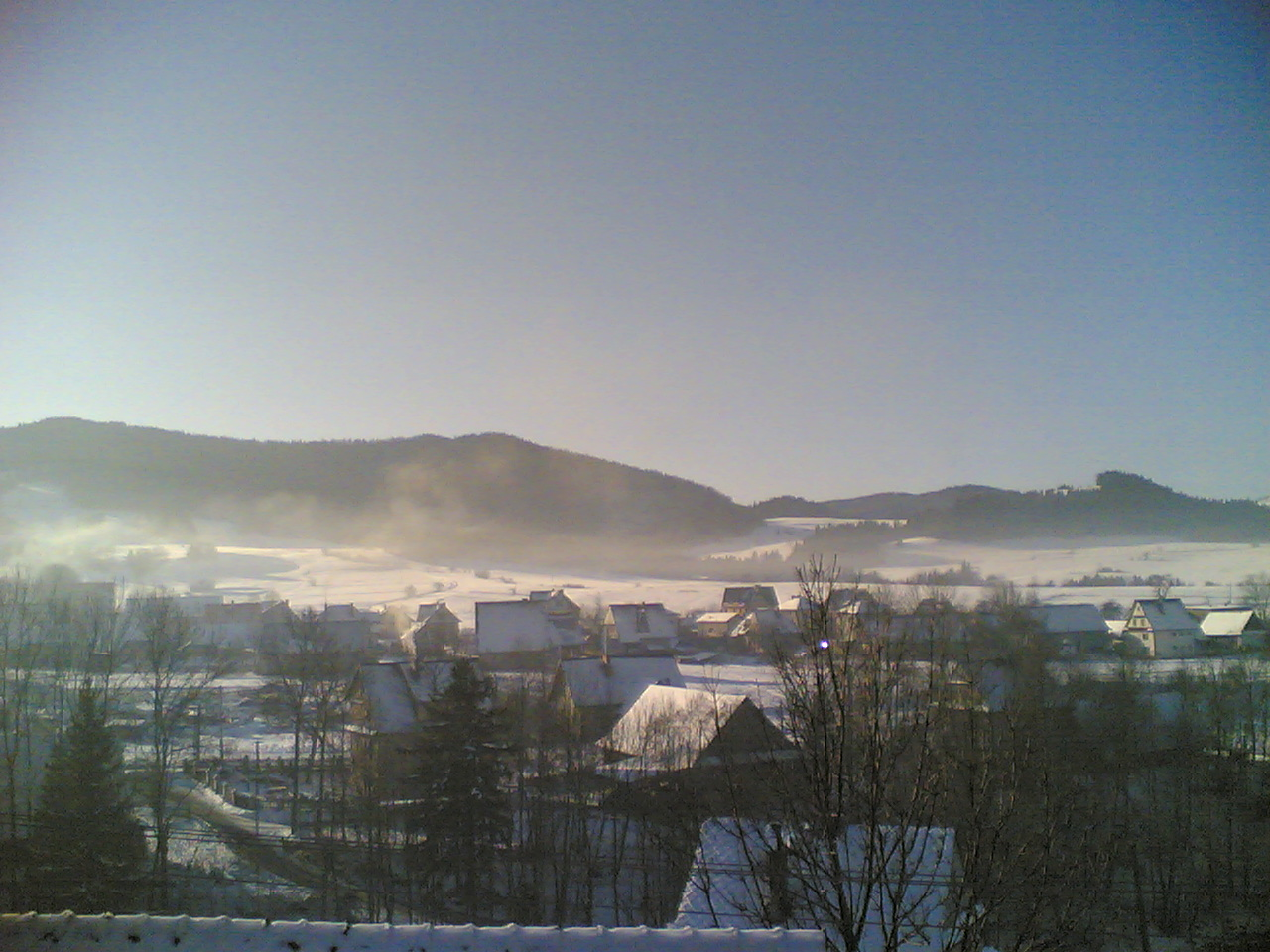
- General view of the village in winter

- Location within Poland
- Coordinates: 49°36′N 20°7′E
- Country: Poland
- Voivodeship: Lesser Poland
- County: Limanowa
- Gmina: Niedźwiedź
- Elevation: 550 m (1,800 ft)
- Population: 2,008

Konina [kɔˈnina] is a village in the administrative district of Gmina Niedźwiedź, within Limanowa County, Lesser Poland Voivodeship, in southern Poland.
