= Kanin Puttamanunt =

Thai actor (born 1988)

- กณิณ ปัทมนันถ์
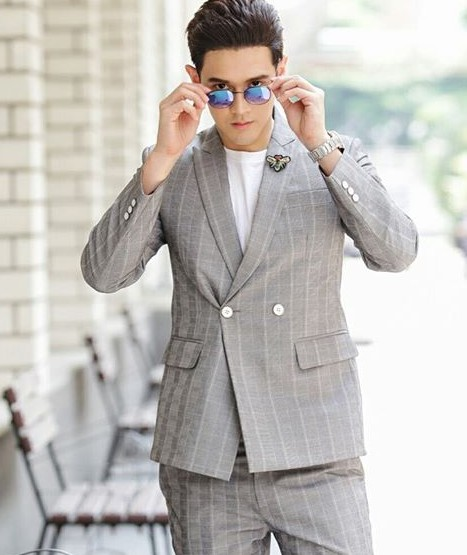
- Born: Khomsan Arunrueangsawat; March 30, 1988 (age 38); Bangkok, Thailand
- Other name: Nadon Kanin (ณดล กณิณ)
- Education: Rajamangala University of Technology Phra Nakhon
- Occupation: Actor
- Years active: 2008–present

Khomsan Arunrueangsawat (Thai: คมสันต์ อรุณเรืองสวัสดิ์, IPA: [kˈɒmsən ˈaɹənɹˌuːɐŋsˌawɒt]; born 30 March 1988) nicknamed Don (Thai: ดนฐ์), known by his stage name as Kanin Puttamanunt (Thai: กณิณ ปัทมนันถ์, [kˈanɪn pˈʌtɐmˌanjuːnt]); is a Thai actor.

== Life and career ==
Kanin was born Khomsan Arunrueangsawat on March 30, 1988 in Bangkok, Thailand. He has two siblings He graduated from Rajamangala University of Technology Phra Nakhon.

In 2008, he started his model career as a model in the RS Group before getting invited in his acting career by Suppachai Srivijit. He was cast in different shows including Leum Prai Lai Ruk and Soot Dtae Jai Ja Kwai Kwah which he later titled himself as an actor of Channel 3 HD.

In 2012, he ended his contract of being an actor for Channel 3 HD and got an opportunity to be an actor for Channel 7 HD.

== Personal life ==
Kanin got an injury from a bomb while filming Athit Apsaeng.
