= Pisarzowa =

- Village
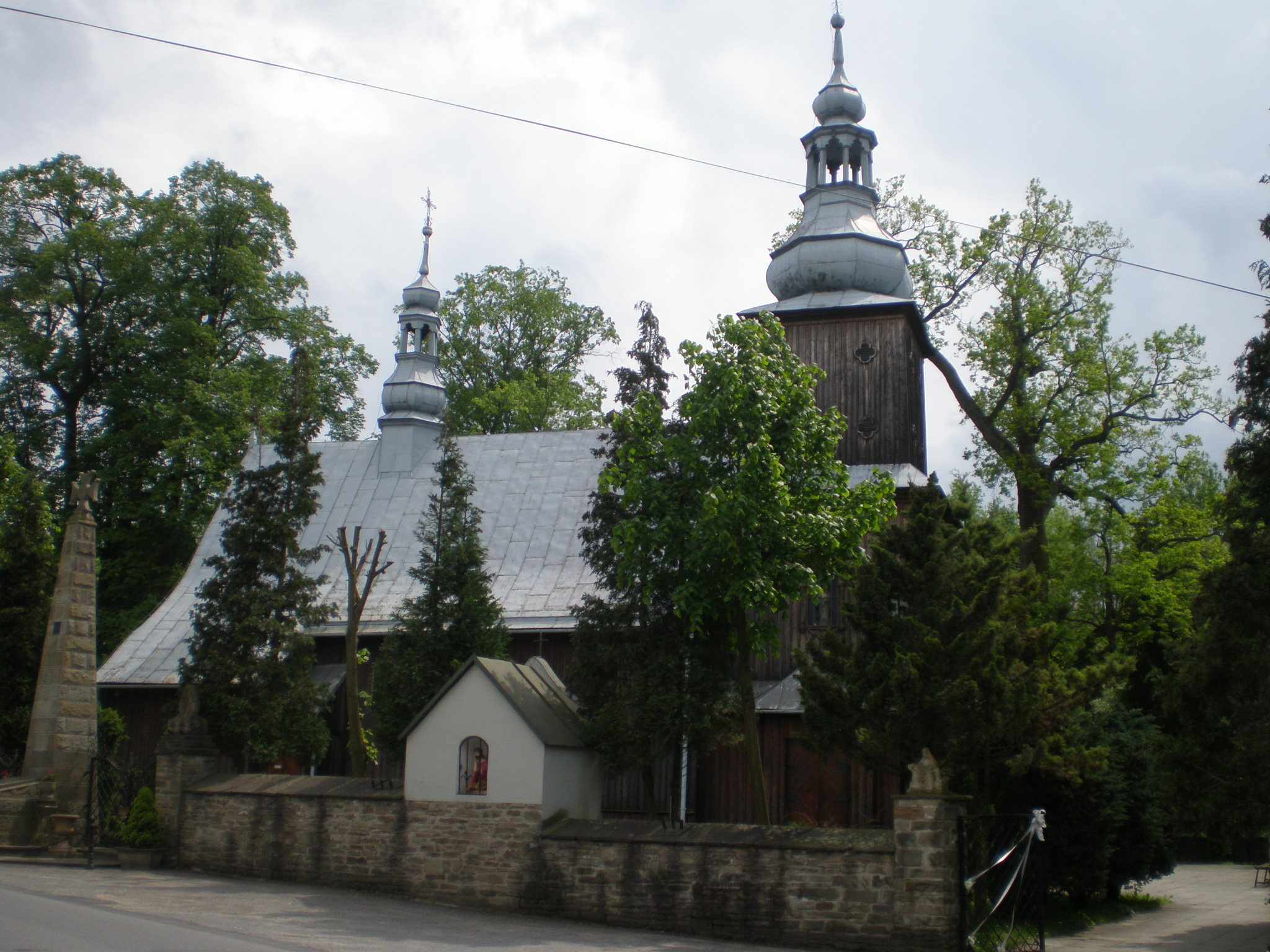
- St. John the Evangelist church

- Location within Poland
- Coordinates: 49°41′34″N 20°29′46″E
- Country: Poland
- Voivodeship: Lesser Poland
- County: Limanowa
- Gmina: Limanowa
- Highest elevation: 550 m (1,800 ft)
- Lowest elevation: 450 m (1,480 ft)

Pisarzowa [pisaˈʐɔva] is a village in the administrative district of Gmina Limanowa, within Limanowa County, Lesser Poland Voivodeship, in southern Poland.
