= Limanowa =

Town in Lesser Poland Voivodeship, Poland

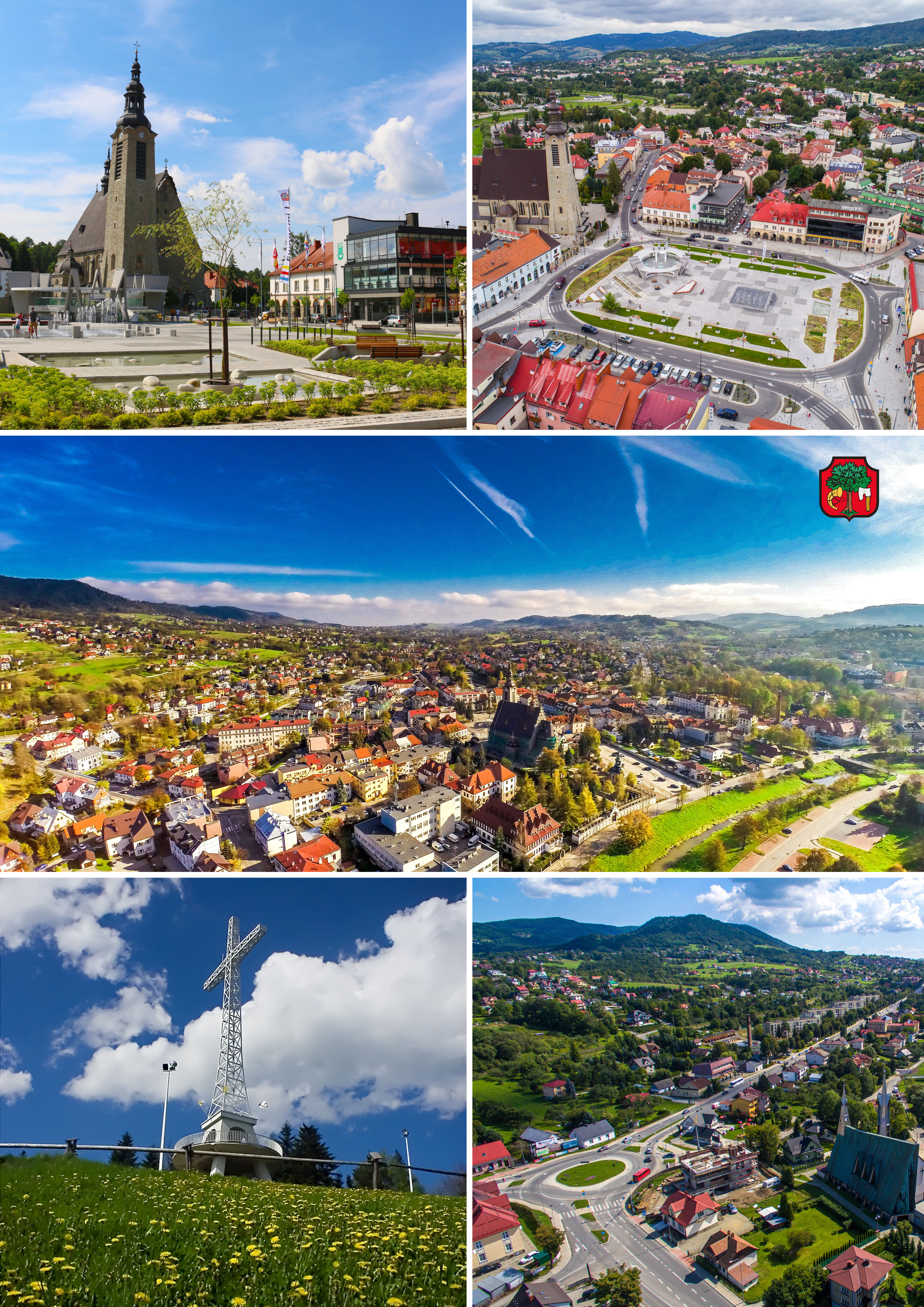
- Views of Limanowa

- Flag Coat of arms
- Interactive map of Limanowa
- Location within Poland
- Coordinates: 49°42′2″N 20°25′36″E
- Country: Poland
- Voivodeship: Lesser Poland
- County: Limanowa
- Gmina: Limanowa (urban gmina)

Government
  - Mayor: Jolanta Juszkiewicz

Area
  - Total: 18.7 km^{2} (7.2 sq mi)
- Elevation: 400 m (1,300 ft)

Population (2019)
  - Total: 14,738
  - Density: 788/km^{2} (2,040/sq mi)
- Time zone: UTC+1 (CET)
  - Summer (DST): UTC+2 (CEST)
- Postal code: 34-600, 34-601, 34-651
- Car plates: KLI
- Website: miastolimanowa.pl

Limanowa [lʲima'nɔva] is a town in southern Poland, in the Lesser Poland Voivodeship. It is the capital of Limanowa County and had a population of 15,132 in 2012.

== History ==
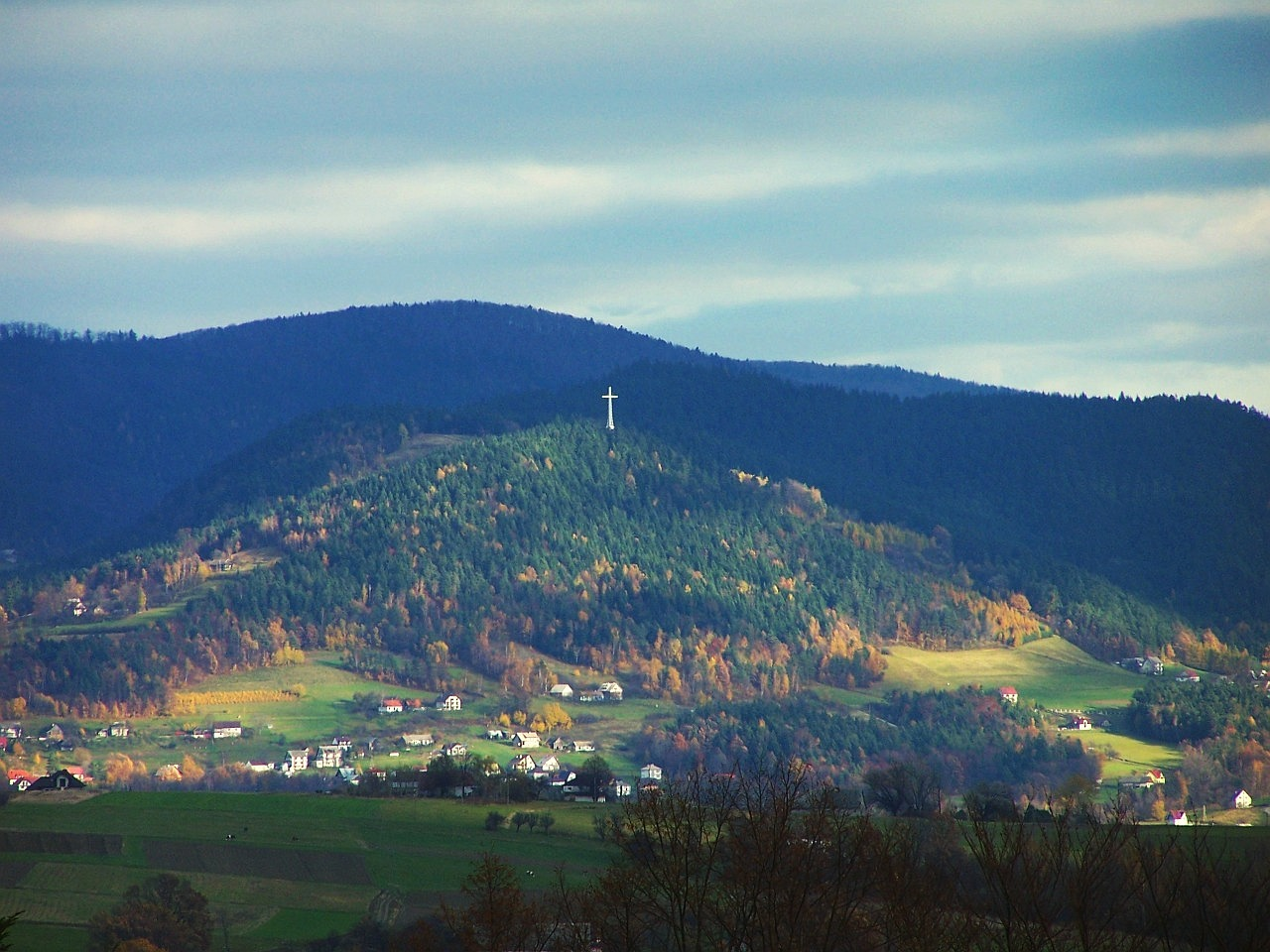
Panorama of Limanowa

Mentions of the town date back to 1496, when it was documented as Ilmanowa, a rural estate that belonged to members of the szlachta. In 1520, ownership of the estate was passed from the Słupski family to Achacy Jordan, who subsequently established a judiciary.

Limanowa became a township in 1565 after being granted city rights by King Sigismund II Augustus. For thirty years, the residents were not required to pay taxes to the Crown, during which time the town rapidly developed. However, its economic strength declined due to the plague and destruction caused by the Swedish invasion of 1655.

While the town was constantly damaged by fire because of its wooden buildings, the fire of 1759 destroyed much of its infrastructure. It was only in the Polish Partitions and Limanowa's incorporation into the Austrian province of Galicia that it was rebuilt. The town began flourishing as a trading hub, hosting over eighteen markets yearly.

During World War I, Limanowa was located at the Eastern Front. In the early months of the war, it was the site of the Battle of Limanowa between 1 and 9 December 1914, in which the Austro-Hungarian Army repelled a Russian breakthrough southwestwards between Limanowa and Kraków.

The Second World War saw an invasion by German soldiers and the establishment of a ghetto in Limanowa. The town suffered heavy casualties as a result of the occupation; 472 people were shot as hostages and conspiracy participants, 123 as concentration camp prisoners, 91 people died in the Third Reich, 47 died fighting in the war, and 3,053 people from Limanowa's Jewish population were murdered, including the family of Senator Bernie Sanders.

== Sports ==
- Limanovia Limanowa, a football team playing in local league.
- Limblach Limanowa, a basketball team reaching top Polish leagues.
- Limanowa is also home to one of the most extreme mountain marathons in Europe, the so-called "Kierat," which attracts hundreds of people every year.

== People ==
- Zygmunt Berling (1896–1980), general, politician
- Teresa Dzielska (pl) (born 1977), actress
- Dorota Gawryluk (pl) (born 1972), journalist and TV presenter
- Jakub Kot (born 1990), ski jumper
- Maciej Kot (born 1991), ski jumper
- Justyna Kowalczyk (born 1983), cross-country skier and multiple Olympic medallist
- Katarzyna Niewiadoma (born 1994), racing cyclist
- Katarzyna Zielińska (pl) (born 1979), actress

== International relations ==
=== Twin towns — Sister cities ===
Limanowa is twinned with:

- Niles, United States
- Truskavets, Ukraine
- Dolný Kubín, Slovakia
