= Limanowa County =

Limanowa County Powiat limanowski
- County
- Flag Coat of arms

- Location within the voivodeship
- Coordinates (Limanowa): 49°42′2″N 20°25′36″E
- Country: Poland
- Voivodeship: Lesser Poland
- Seat: Limanowa
- Gminas: Total 12 (incl. 2 urban): Limanowa; Mszana Dolna; Gmina Dobra; Gmina Jodłownik; Gmina Kamienica; Gmina Laskowa; Gmina Limanowa; Gmina Łukowica; Gmina Mszana Dolna; Gmina Niedźwiedź; Gmina Słopnice; Gmina Tymbark

Area
  - Total: 951.96 km^{2} (367.55 sq mi)

Population (2019)
  - Total: 131,729
  - Density: 138.38/km^{2} (358.39/sq mi)
  - Urban: 23,101
  - Rural: 108,628
- Car plates: KLI
- Website: powiat.limanowski.pl

Limanowa County (Polish: powiat limanowski) is a unit of territorial administration and local government (powiat) in Lesser Poland Voivodeship, southern Poland. It came into being on January 1, 1999, as a result of the Polish local government reforms passed in 1998. Its administrative seat and largest town is Limanowa, which lies 54 kilometres (34 mi) south-east of the regional capital Kraków. The only other town in the county is Mszana Dolna, lying 27 km (17 mi) west of Limanowa.The county is divided between Gorals in the territories of gmina Mszana Dolna and gmina Niedziewiedź and Lachs in the rest of the territory.

The county covers an area of 951.96 square kilometres (367.6 sq mi). As of 2019 its total population is 121,804, out of which the population of Limanowa is 15,157, that of Mszana Dolna is 7,944, and the rural population is 108,628.

== Neighbouring counties ==
Limanowa County is bordered by Bochnia County and Brzesko County to the north, Nowy Sącz County to the east, Nowy Targ County to the south-west, and Myślenice County to the west.

== Administrative division ==
The county is subdivided into 12 gminas (two urban and 10 rural). These are listed in the following table, in descending order of population.

Gmina	Type	Area (km^{2})	Population (2019)	Seat
Gmina Limanowa	rural	152.4	25,550	Limanowa *
Gmina Mszana Dolna	rural	169.8	17,627	Mszana Dolna *
Limanowa	urban	18.6	15,157	
Gmina Łukowica	rural	69.7	10,063	Łukowica
Gmina Dobra	rural	109.1	9,973	Dobra
Gmina Jodłownik	rural	72.4	8,683	Jodłownik
Gmina Laskowa	rural	72.8	8,189	Laskowa
Mszana Dolna	urban	27.1	7,944	
Gmina Kamienica	rural	96.1	7,862	Kamienica
Gmina Niedźwiedź	rural	74.4	7,370	Niedźwiedź
Gmina Słopnice	rural	56.7	6,737	Słopnice
Gmina Tymbark	rural	32.7	6,574	Tymbark
* seat not part of the gmina
