= Przyszowa =

- Village
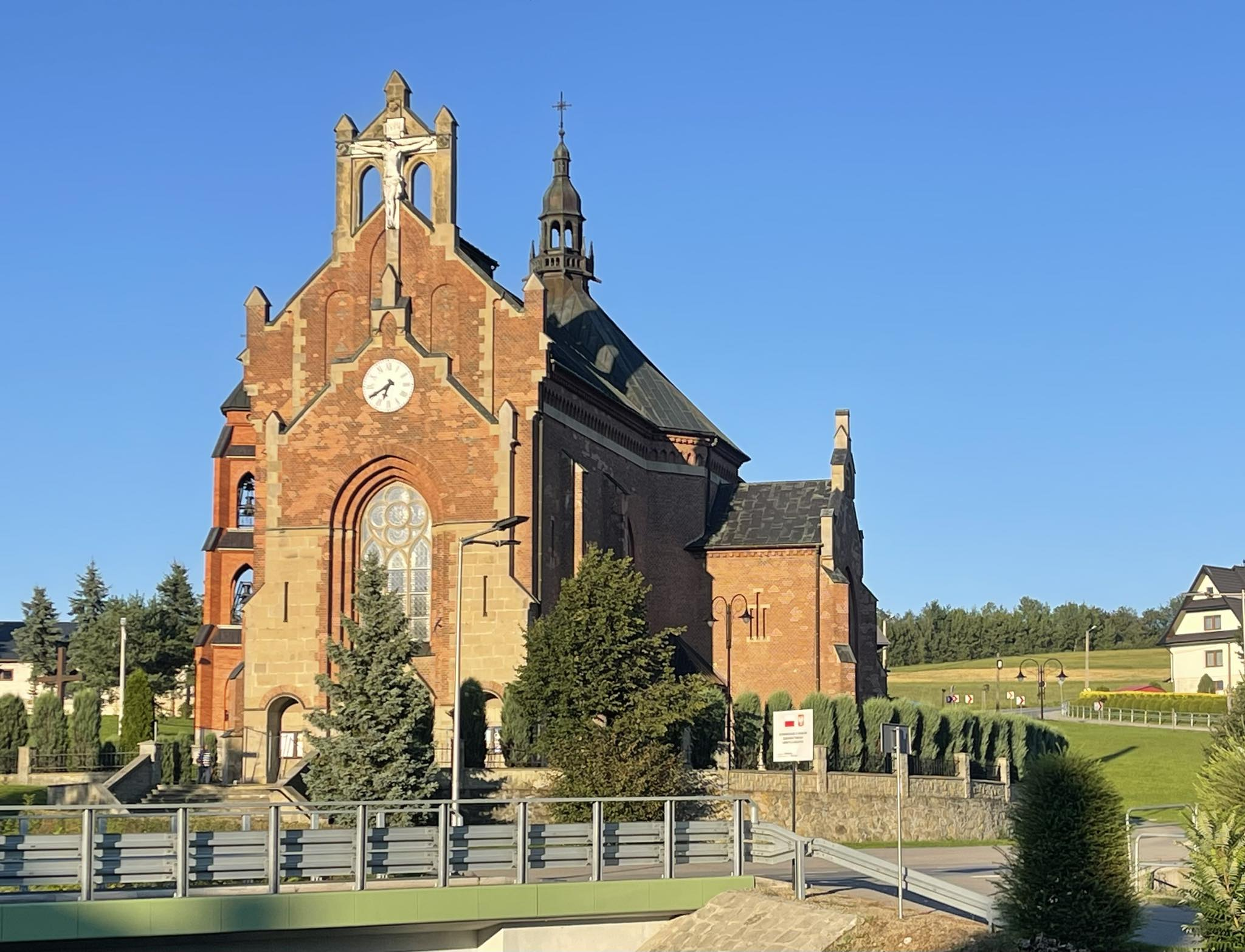
- St. Nicholas Church in Przyszowa

- Location within Poland
- Coordinates: 49°39′N 20°30′E
- Country: Poland
- Province: Lesser Poland
- County: Limanowa
- Gmina: Łukowica
- Area: 18.6 km^{2} (7.2 sq mi)
- Elevation: 420–803 m (1,378–2,635 ft)
- Population (2025): 2,652
- Time zone: UTC+1 (CET)
  - Summer (DST): UTC+2 (CEST)
- Postal code: 34-604

Przyszowa [pʂɨˈʂɔva] is a village in southern Poland, in the Limanowa County, within the province of Lesser Poland.

== History ==
The earliest known evidence of human activity in the area of present-day Przyszowa was discovered on Mount Łyżka. Finds include pottery fragments dating from the 18th to the 16th centuries BC, probably belonging to the late phase of the Mierzanowice culture, as well as pottery from later periods, including the Iron Age. The origins and purpose of the stone structures on the mountain remain under investigation, with ritual and funerary uses among the possibilities being considered. Local tradition also associates Łyżka with a castle known as Stare Zamczysko ("Old Castle") and with treasures said to have been hidden there by Saint Kinga to keep them safe from the Tatars.

The first written references to Przyszowa date from the 14th century. A parish existed there by 1325, although the precise dates when the settlement and parish were established are unknown. By the late 14th century, the village was owned by members of the nobility. In 1399, its owners were Zbyszko and Jakusz of Przyszowa.

During the 15th and 16th centuries, the history of Przyszowa was closely linked to the Wierzbięta family, which bore the Janina coat of arms. The earliest known member of the family in Przyszowa was Michał Wierzbięta, recorded in 1417. In 1423, he owned half of Przyszowa and half of nearby Janina, a former village on the River Słomka near Siekierczyna.

In 1431, Wierzbięta of Przyszowa, Michał's brother, took part in an expedition against the Carthusian monastery at Lechnica in Spiš, near present-day Červený Kláštor in Slovakia. In 1443, he served as steward of Stary Sącz, which then belonged to the convent of the Poor Clares. His death around 1446 led to a prolonged dispute between the owners of Przyszowa and the burghers of Nowy Sącz. His sons, including Marcin and Jan, accused the burghers of murdering their father and pursued their claims before the royal authorities for many years. The dispute ended in a settlement in 1470: the burghers of Nowy Sącz agreed to pay compensation to the Wierzbięta family, and the owners of Przyszowa relinquished all further claims.

Towards the end of the 15th century, the Wierzbięta family expanded its holdings around Bilsko, near Rożnów. In 1486, Wierzbięta of Przyszowa, who was married to Elżbieta, daughter of Wiernek of Bilsko, acquired part of the estates there from her sister Małgorzata Ratołdowa. In 1489, Elżbieta and her husband received a share of the estate left by her brother Mikołaj Wiernek. The following year, Wierzbięta purchased further shares from her sister Stachna. In 1505, he bought another part of Bilsko from Jan Dymliński, together with a meadow in Łączne, now part of Łososina Dolna.

In 1519, Grzegorz Wierzbięta transferred his estates in Przyszowa and Bilsko to his nephews Jakub and Feliks, the sons of Marcin Wierzbięta. Feliks, a royal courtier, received holdings in Bilsko, Biała (now part of Michalczowa), Wola pod Ostrą Górą (within present-day Bilsko) and Krużlowa, among other properties. Grzegorz settled in Nowy Sącz, where in 1521 he paid for a new roof for the hospital of the Franciscan monastery on what is now Pijarska Street. In 1525, Małgorzata, the sister of Jakub and Feliks, received her share of their parents' estate.

Jakub Wierzbięta became deputy starosta of Nowy Sącz. In the first half of the 16th century, he founded Nowa Janina within Przyszowa, in the part of the village bordering Siekierczyna. The name was later applied to the northern part of Przyszowa, including the area of present-day Berdychów. In 1535, he took part in the Lithuanian–Muscovite War (1534–1537) under the command of Hetman Jan Tarnowski. He distinguished himself during the capture of Starodub; according to Tarnowski, his deeds "brought great renown to his family".

In 1560, Jakub's five sons—Andrzej, Mikołaj, Marcin, Stanisław and Wojciech—and his daughter Anna divided the family estate. Andrzej received the southern part of Przyszowa, including Wądole, the main manor house and the right of patronage over the local church. This holding formed the basis of the later Niżni Dwór ("Lower Manor") estate. Mikołaj received Stare Dworzysko, later known as Wyżni Dwór ("Upper Manor"), in the area of the former village of Janina, now part of Siekierczyna. Marcin received Podoszczyzna and Zaręboszczyzna in northern Przyszowa, including the eastern part of what later became the Berdychów manorial farm. Stanisław received Nowa Janina in northern Przyszowa, towards Siekierczyna, together with the Załubincze manorial farm near Nowy Sącz. Wojciech received Siekierczyna.

The division of the estate in 1560 remained in place for several decades. In 1581, separate parts of Przyszowa belonged to Andrzej, Mikołaj, Marcin and Stanisław Wierzbięta. The four brothers nevertheless continued to act together in matters concerning the village. In 1593, they were jointly involved in boundary disputes with the Sędzimir and Łapka families, whose estates lay in neighbouring Łukowica and Roztoka, and in Zawada, now part of Łukowica. Five years later, Stanisław Wierzbięta, who owned Nowa Janina in northern Przyszowa, was involved in a legal dispute with Krzysztof Wiktor, the owner of Siekierczyna, over the boundary between their estates.

In the second half of the 16th century, the ideas of the Reformation, which had been spreading across Europe for several decades, also gained support among the nobility of the Sącz region in the Polish–Lithuanian Commonwealth. In Przyszowa, some members of the Wierzbięta family became associated with the Polish Brethren, and the local church was converted into a meeting house for the congregation. The Catholic parish ceased to function during this period, and the church eventually fell into disuse and ruin. By 1608, it was severely damaged. A new wooden Catholic church dedicated to St Nicholas was built in 1612.

Land ownership became increasingly fragmented during the 17th century. Estates in Przyszowa passed to the Łapka family of Łapanów in present-day Bochnia County; the Wiktor family of Wiatrowice on the Dunajec, now part of Tropie; and the Przyborowski, Podoski and Wielogłowski families. Several branches of the Wierzbięta family also retained their own holdings. In 1629, separate parts of the village were owned by Stefan and Jan Wierzbięta, while another was held by Samuel Przyborowski.

In the mid-17th century, some estates in Przyszowa still belonged to members of the Polish Brethren. One was Jan Podoski, who owned a manor house at Podowszczyzna in the upper part of Przyszowa. In 1655, during the Swedish Deluge, armed peasants attacked and looted his manor house. This was one of several attacks on estates belonging to members of the Polish Brethren in the Sącz region after Nowy Sącz had been recaptured from Swedish forces.

In the second half of the 17th century, the main manor house passed to the Dunin-Wąsowicz family, which bore the Łabędź coat of arms and came from Smogorzów near Przysucha in present-day Masovian Voivodeship. In 1676, Krzysztof Dunin-Wąsowicz married Zofia Taszycka of neighbouring Stronie. A year later, part of Przyszowa also belonged to Jan Wąsowicz of Smogorzów. In 1679, Aleksander Żuk-Skarszewski, a comrade-in-arms of Krzysztof Dunin-Wąsowicz, married Katarzyna Taszycka, Zofia's sister. In 1683, he purchased part of the Przyszowa estates from the Wąsowicz family, including the main manor house, known as Niżni Dwór. He thus established the Przyszowa branch of the Żuk-Skarszewski family. The church in Przyszowa also contains the graves of members of the Dunin-Wąsowicz family, including Krzysztof and his wife Zofia, née Taszycka. Other parts of Przyszowa remained in the hands of various noble families after Aleksander's purchase of Niżni Dwór.

The Wielogłowski family held property in Nowa Janina in northern Przyszowa. One member of the family, Stefan Wielogłowski, served as cup-bearer of Rawa and later as castellan of Biecz. His funerary monument is in the church in Przyszowa. In 1715, he helped organise the Tarnogród Confederation. At his initiative, a local confederation was formed at the Proszowice sejmik, with Marcin Rybiński as its marshal.

Following the First Partition of Poland in 1772, Przyszowa and the rest of the Sącz region became part of the Habsburg monarchy, within the Kingdom of Galicia and Lodomeria.

Przyszowa remained divided among several landowners during the 19th century. In 1822, Wincenty Dunikowski transferred the manor house at Berdychów to Józef Wielogłowski and Ewa Wielogłowska, née Dunikowska. Their daughter Cecylia Racięska later inherited the estate. In 1848, Protazy Żuk-Skarszewski issued his Odezwa do Włościanów z Części Wyżniej i Niżniej Gminy Przyszowy, releasing the peasants on his estates from their obligation to perform corvée labour. Records from 1852–1858 show several separate manorial estates, owned by members of the Żuk-Skarszewski, Wierzbięta, Żelazowski, Wielogłowski, Mieczkowski, Kałuski, Podoski and Racięski families, among others. In 1854, Przyszowa had 1,172 inhabitants.

Local education also developed during this period. In 1852, the village's first dedicated school building was erected on parish land.

The painter, poet and playwright Tytus Czyżewski was born on the Berdychów estate in 1880, when it belonged to Cecylia Racięska. He was a co-founder of Formism and one of the pioneers of modern Polish painting.

By the late 19th century, Przyszowa had about 1,500 inhabitants. The village had a parish school, a mutual aid and loan fund, a sawmill, a grain mill and a fertiliser works. In 1893, the municipality built a new masonry school building. The main manor house belonged to Faustyn Żuk-Skarszewski, a poet and member of both the Imperial Council and the Diet of Galicia and Lodomeria. Smaller manor houses stood at Rusinówka, Podoszczyzna, Ogrojec and Berdychów. Przyszowa was also associated with the long-established noble families of Hebda, Pierzchała, Suchodolski, Sułkowski, Wajda and Zaręba.

The present Gothic Revival Church of St Nicholas was built between 1901 and 1906 to a design by Teodor Talowski. The earlier wooden church, built in 1612, was demolished after the new church was completed.

In 1907, the Kraków Society for Popular Education opened a reading room in Przyszowa. It was managed by Piotr Zieliński and initially held 105 books.

In December 1914, during the First World War, the area around Przyszowa saw fighting as part of the Limanowa–Łapanów operation, an Austro-Hungarian counter-offensive against Russian forces. Small detachments of the 11th Honvéd Cavalry Division fought in the Stara Wieś–Siekierczyna–Przyszowa sector. The main manor complex, including its tower, was damaged during the fighting. Russian troops also looted the rectory, and some parish records were lost.

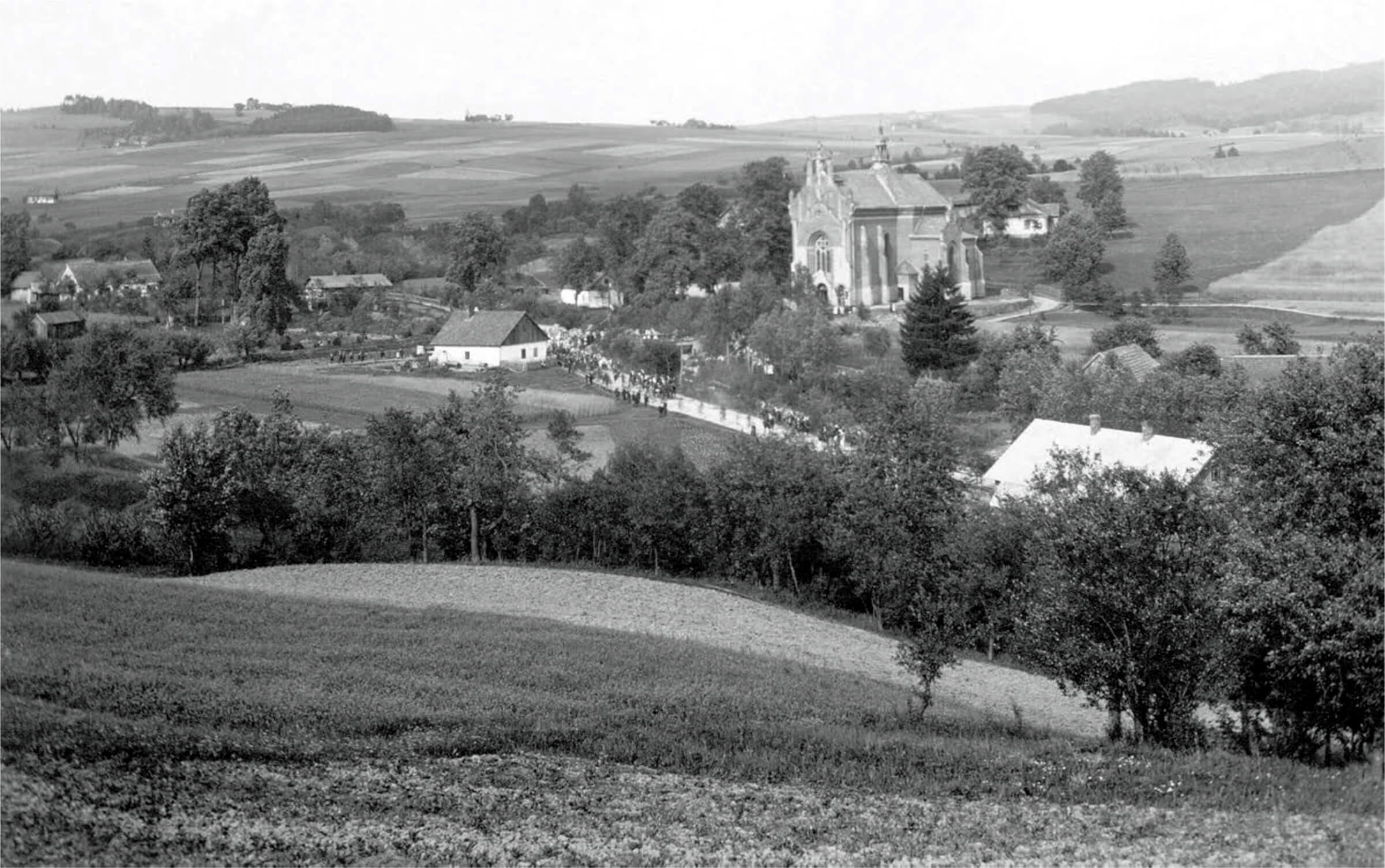
Przyszowa in 1930, viewed from the south-west

In 1921, Przyszowa had 1,786 inhabitants and 304 residential buildings. From 1922, the village served as a summer resort and later developed facilities for medical treatment. A Stefczyk credit co-operative was founded in 1924, building on earlier co-operative lending activity in the village. In 1931, Przyszowa had 1,811 inhabitants and 342 residential buildings. That year, a clinic opened in the main manor complex. By 1932, it was operating under the name "Zakład wodoleczniczy dr. Żuka-Skarszewskiego" ("Dr Żuk-Skarszewski's Hydrotherapy Clinic"). In 1934, Przyszowa ceased to be an independent rural municipality and was incorporated into Gmina Łukowica, which encompassed several villages. A separate school was established in Berdychów the following year. It is now Henryk Sienkiewicz Primary School No. 2.

Following the outbreak of the Second World War in September 1939, Przyszowa came under German occupation. Polish underground resistance groups were active in the village from the early years of the war. In the summer of 1944, the 2nd Battalion of the 23rd SS Police Regiment was stationed in the village while undergoing reorganisation. It remained in Przyszowa until 28 September, with some of its subunits also stationed in nearby Świdnik and Łukowica.

In 1945, the manorial estate was parcelled out, and the main manor house was converted into a primary school. In May that year, Genowefa Kroczek, known by the codename "Lotte", was killed during a raid. She had been an activist in the underground peasant movement and a medical orderly. Her war grave is in the parish cemetery in Przyszowa.

In 1954, the gromada of Przyszowa was established, with its gromada council based in the village. The neighbouring villages of Stronie and Wysokie were incorporated into it in subsequent years. The gromada was abolished at the end of 1972, when an administrative reform restored the gmina system.

In 1997, the main manor house was returned to the Żuk-Skarszewski family. Primary School No. 1 moved from the manor to a new building the following year. The new premises also housed a lower secondary school. In 2002, the two schools were brought under a single administration as the Przyszowa School Complex. This arrangement ended in 2017 as part of the national education reform.

== Religion ==
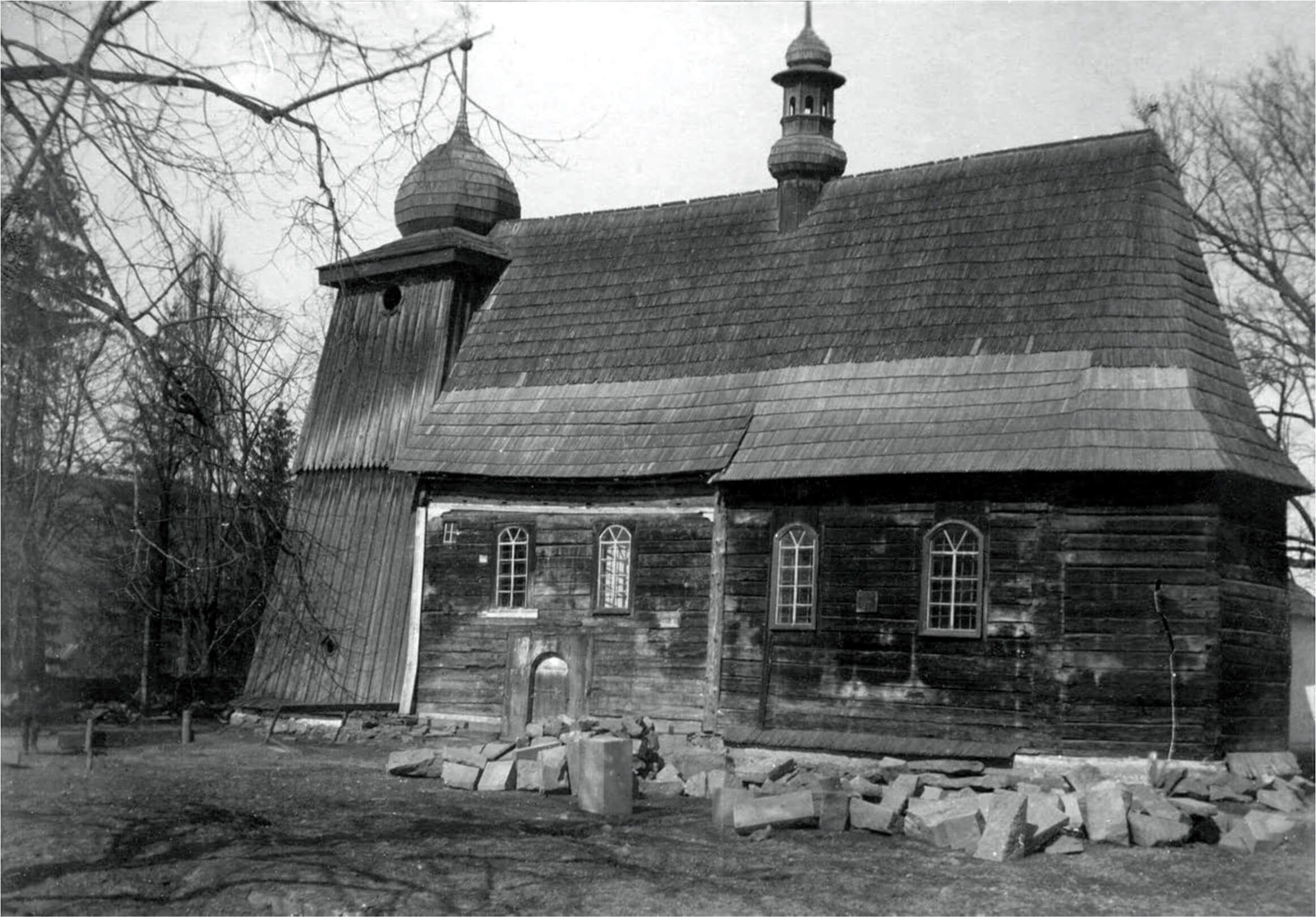
The Old Church of St. Nicholas in Przyszowa (1638-1907)

Jan Długosz, a Polish chronicler, confirms that a Roman Catholic parish existed in the village as early as 1326. Since then, the village was predominantly Catholic with a small Jewish minority, except for a brief period around the turn of the 16th century, when the local nobility, including the owners of the village, the Wierzbieta family, converted to Arianism. In 1580 the parish priest was expelled from the village and the church gradually fell into disrepair and was eventually demolished. In 1612 the Wierzbieta family converted back to Catholicism and provided funds for the construction of a new wooden Church of St. Nicholas, which stood until the end of the 19th century. In 1901–1906 a new Church of St. Nicholas was built in brick with stone dressings, to a design by the architect Teodor Talowski, which is a spectacular example of neo-Gothic architecture.

=== St. Nicholas Church ===
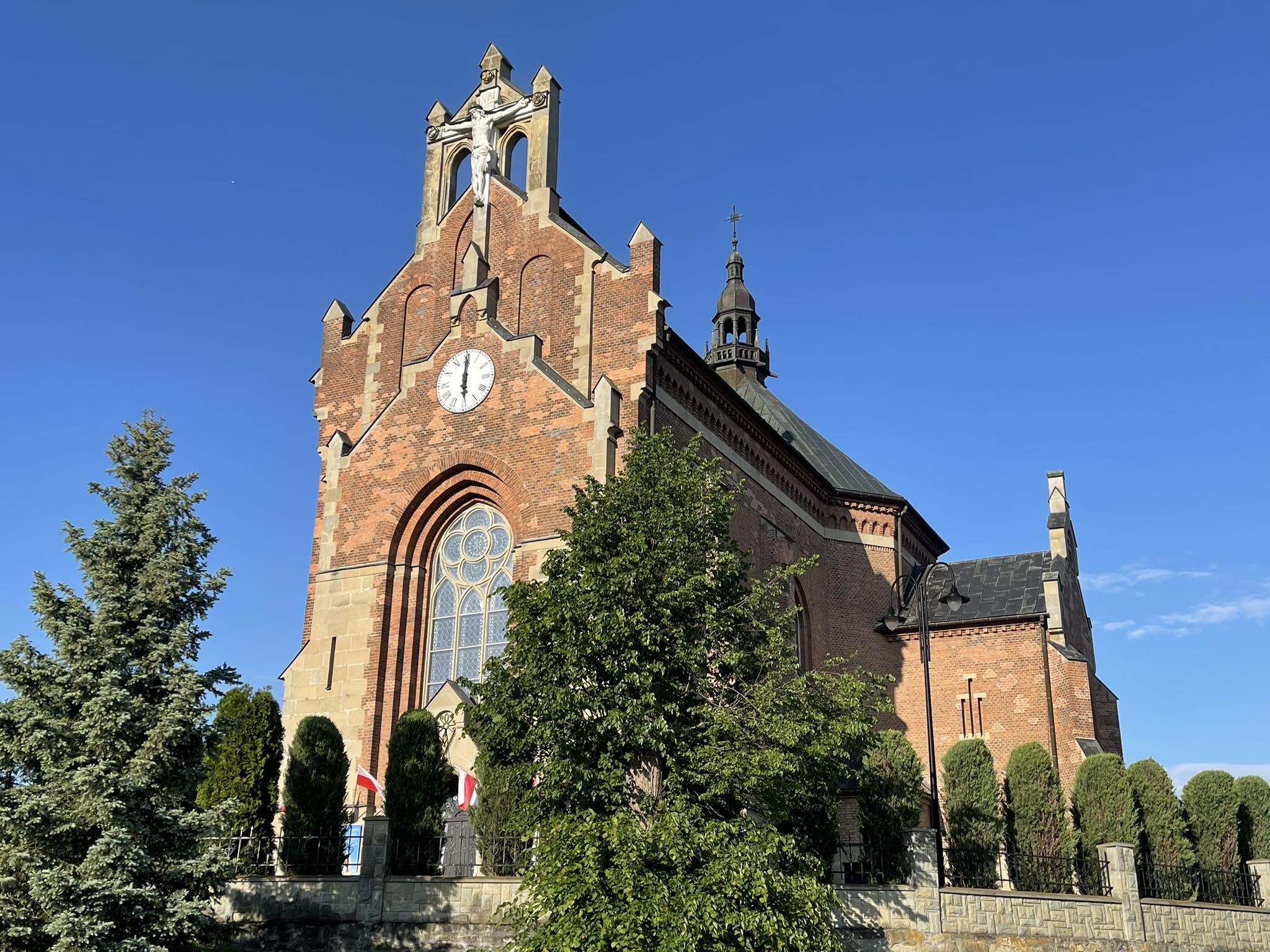

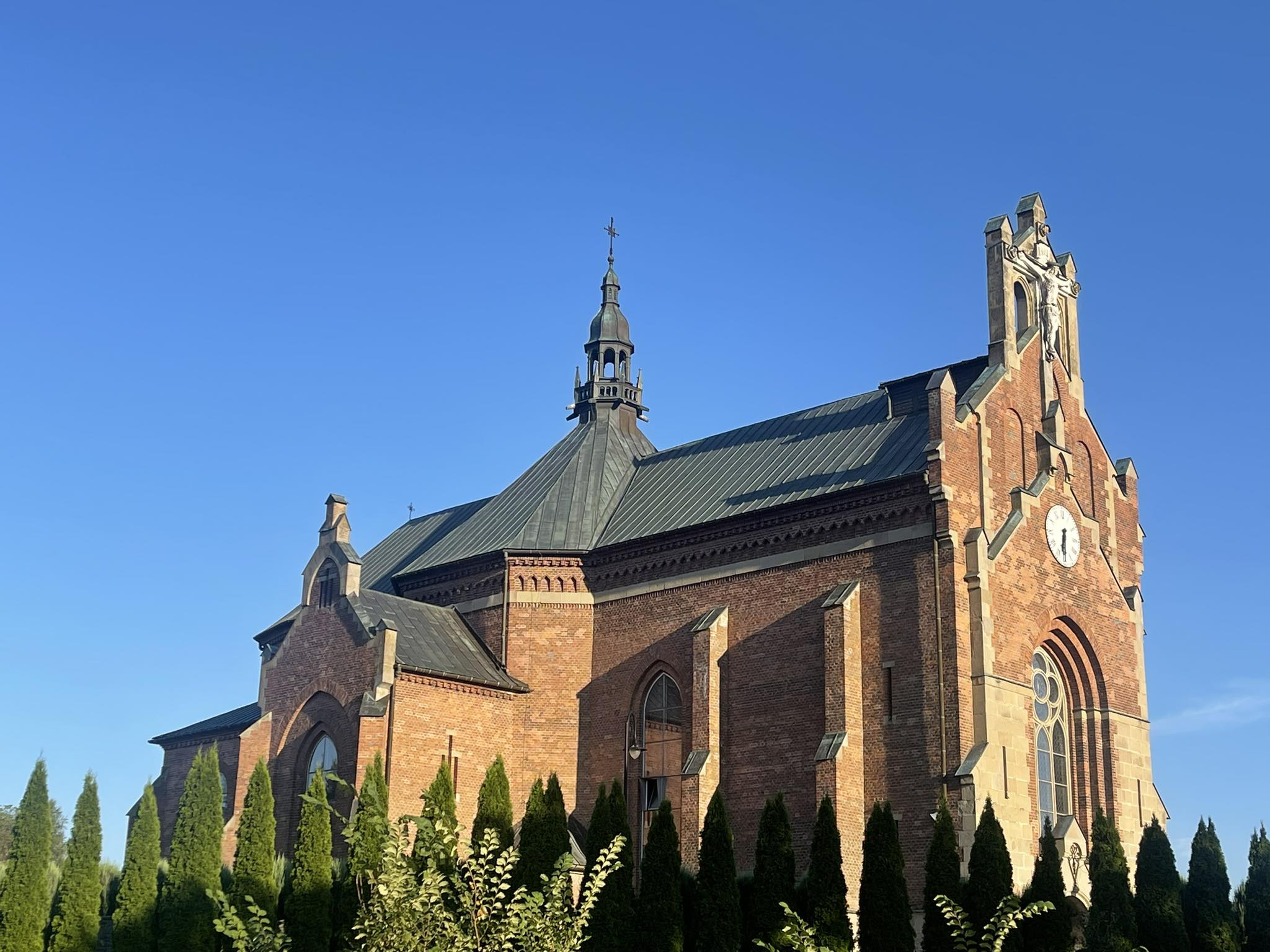

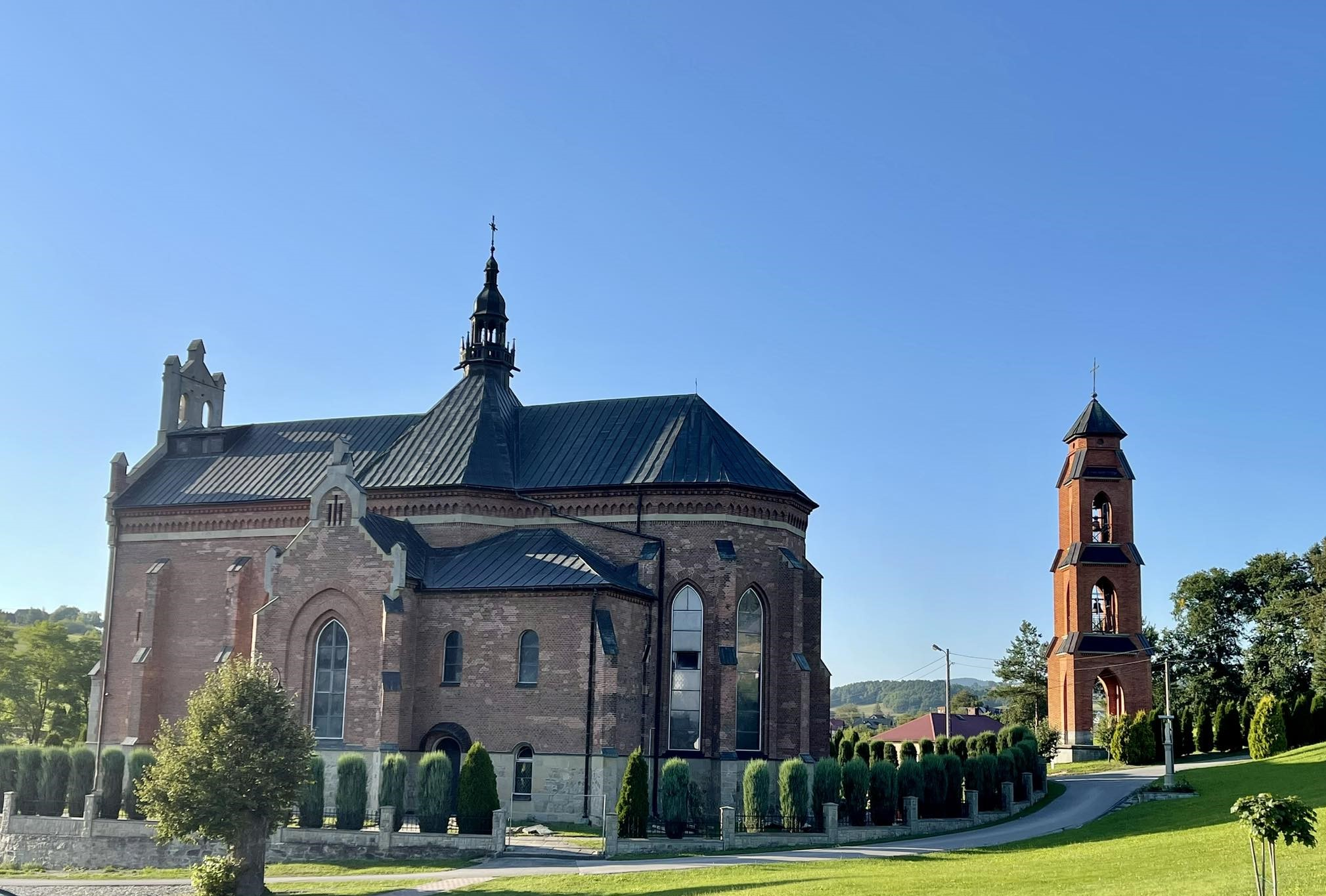

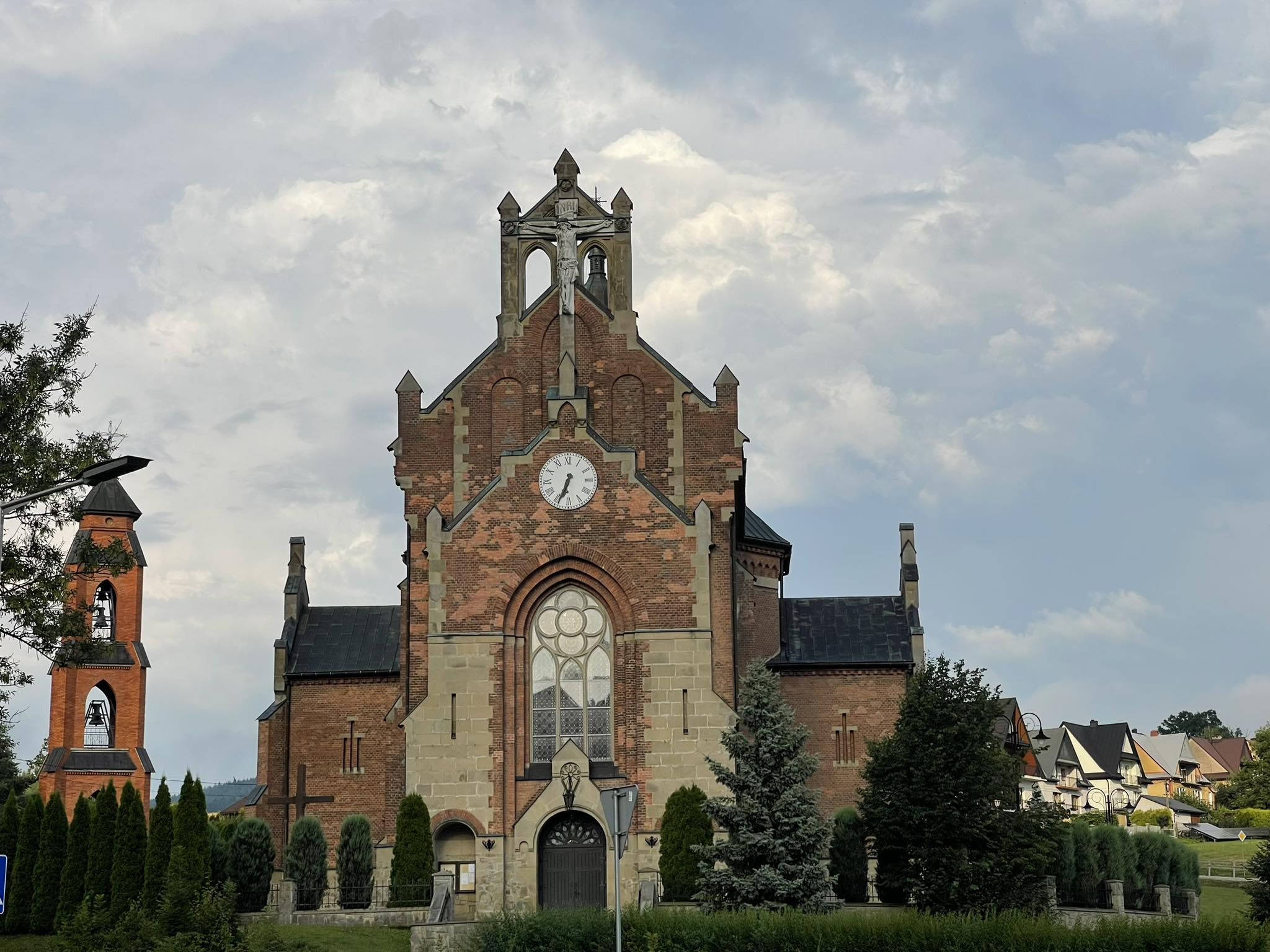

== Culture ==
Przyszowa is one of the largest centres of the culture of Lachy Sądeckie, an ethnographic group of Polish people characterised by a specific dialect and culture, living in the southern Lesser Poland.

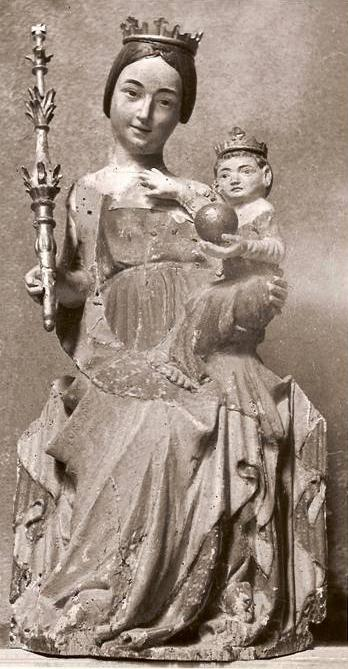
Madonna of Przyszowa, 14th century

Their rich folk culture contains a variety of cultural elements from the highlands and the lowlands of Lesser Poland. The village is home to the regional ensemble "Przyszowianie", which focuses on the unique folk traditions of Lachy Sądeckie and performs live music and dance at folk festivals across the country.

== Geography ==
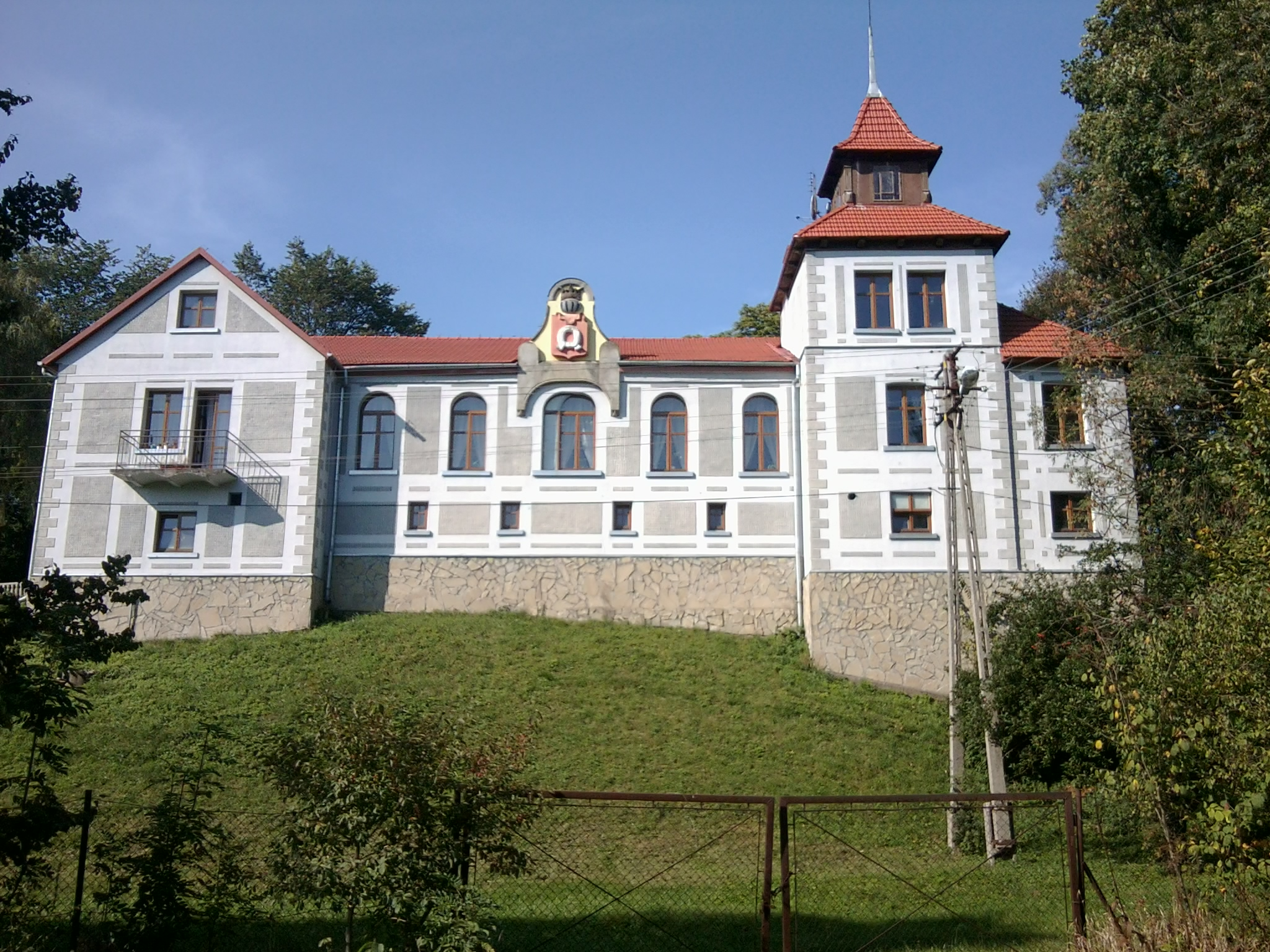
Przyszowa Manor House, 16th century

Przyszowa is located in the east part of Island Beskids mountain range in the Carpathian Mountains. It lies in the valley between the three hills of Łyżka, Pępówka and Piekło. The centre of the village is located on both sides of the river Słomka, 420 – 500 meters above sea level, while the Łyżka hill lies 807 meters above sea level.

== Education ==
- Maria Konopnicka's Primary School
- Henryk Sienkiewicz's Primary School

== Climate ==
Przyszowa has a typical mountain climate with variable weather conditions. Dry air masses from mainland Europe clash here with moist air from the Atlantic. A characteristic feature of the area is a frequent occurrence of sea fog over the valleys caused by temperature inversion. This makes only individual peaks visible, like islands in the sea, hence the name of the area Island Beskids. July is the hottest month of the year when average temperature reaches 27 °C (81 °F), while February, the coldest month of the year sees -12 °C (10 °F) of average low.

Climate data for Przyszowa
Month	Jan	Feb	Mar	Apr	May	Jun	Jul	Aug	Sep	Oct	Nov	Dec	Year
Mean daily maximum °C (°F)	2 (36)	−3 (27)	11 (52)	16 (61)	22 (72)	23 (73)	27 (81)	25 (77)	21 (70)	14 (57)	9 (48)	0 (32)	13.9 (57.0)
Daily mean °C (°F)	−1 (30)	−7 (19)	5 (41)	10 (50)	15 (59)	18 (64)	21 (70)	19 (66)	15 (59)	9 (48)	6 (43)	−3 (27)	8.9 (48.0)
Mean daily minimum °C (°F)	−4 (25)	−12 (10)	−1 (30)	4 (39)	9 (48)	13 (55)	15 (59)	13 (55)	10 (50)	5 (41)	3 (37)	−6 (21)	4.1 (39.4)
Average precipitation mm (inches)	69 (2.7)	43 (1.7)	40 (1.6)	51 (2.0)	69 (2.7)	137 (5.4)	119 (4.7)	59 (2.3)	51 (2.0)	67 (2.6)	44 (1.7)	32 (1.3)	65 (2.6)
Source: AccuWeather

== People ==
- Krzysztof Dunin-Wąsowicz, Polish military commander, colonel, participated in the Second Northern War against Sweden.
- Tytus Czyżewski (1880–1945), Polish painter, art theoretician, Futurist poet, playwright, member of the Polish Formists, and Colorist.

== Gallery ==
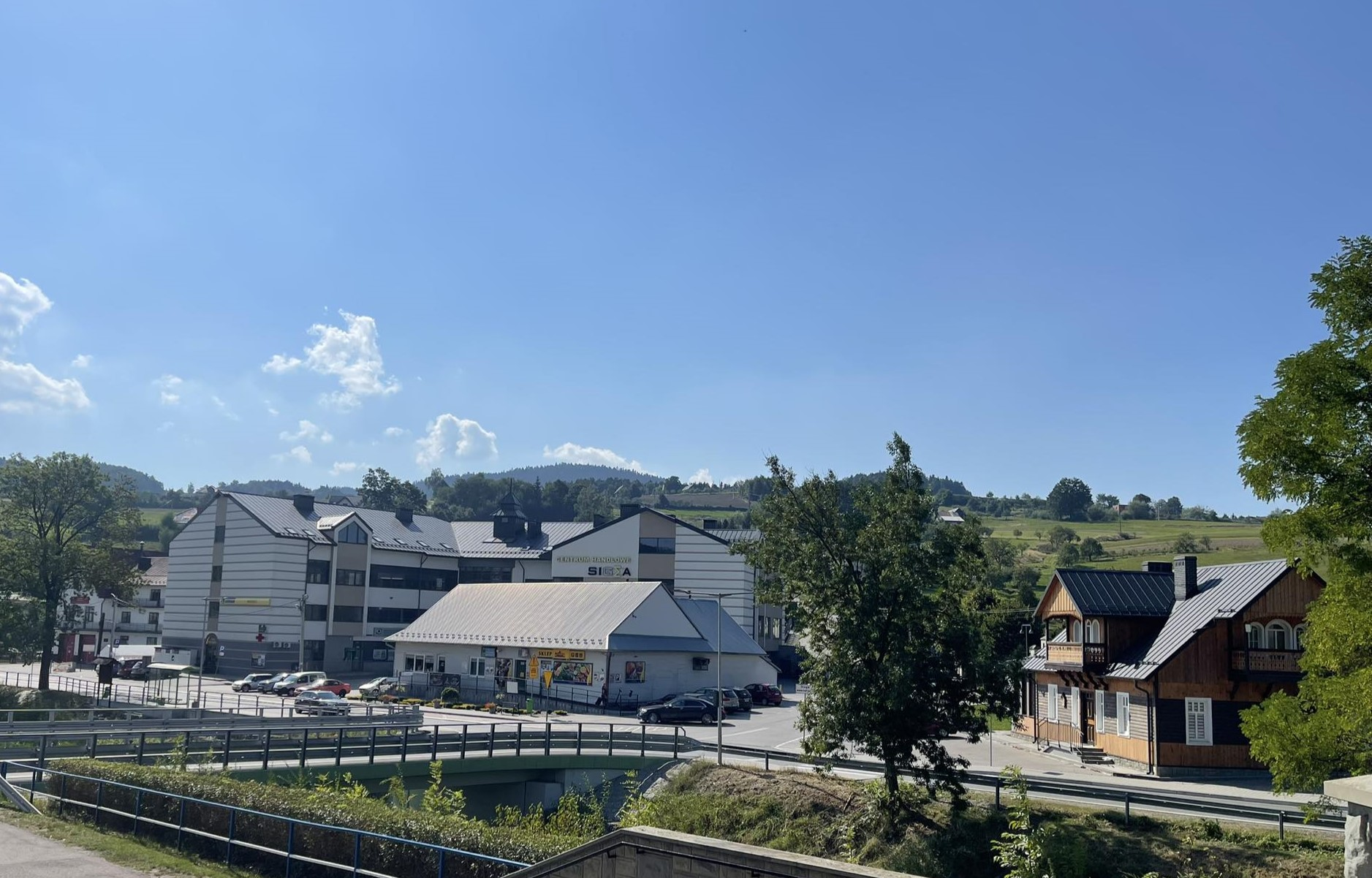

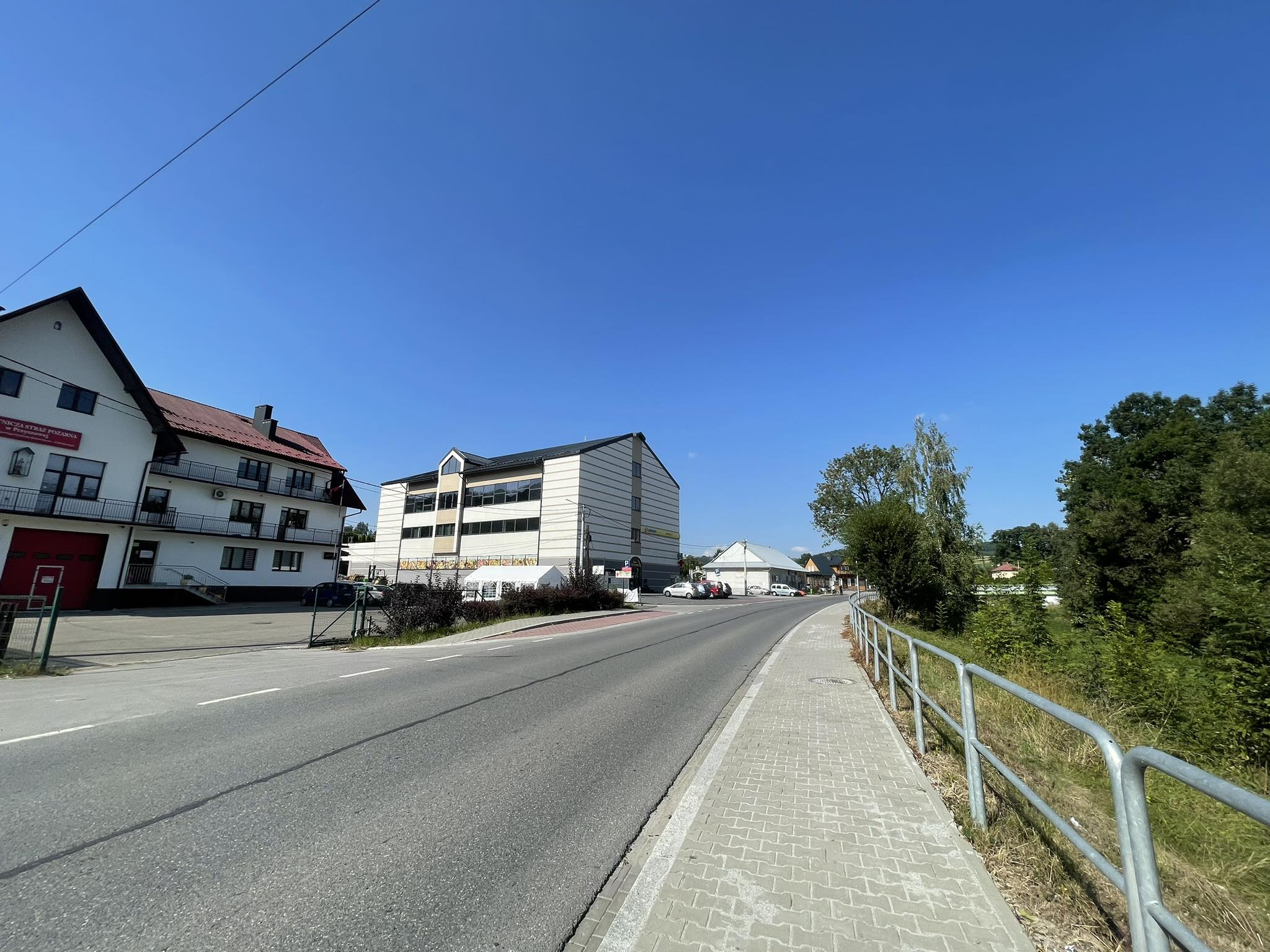

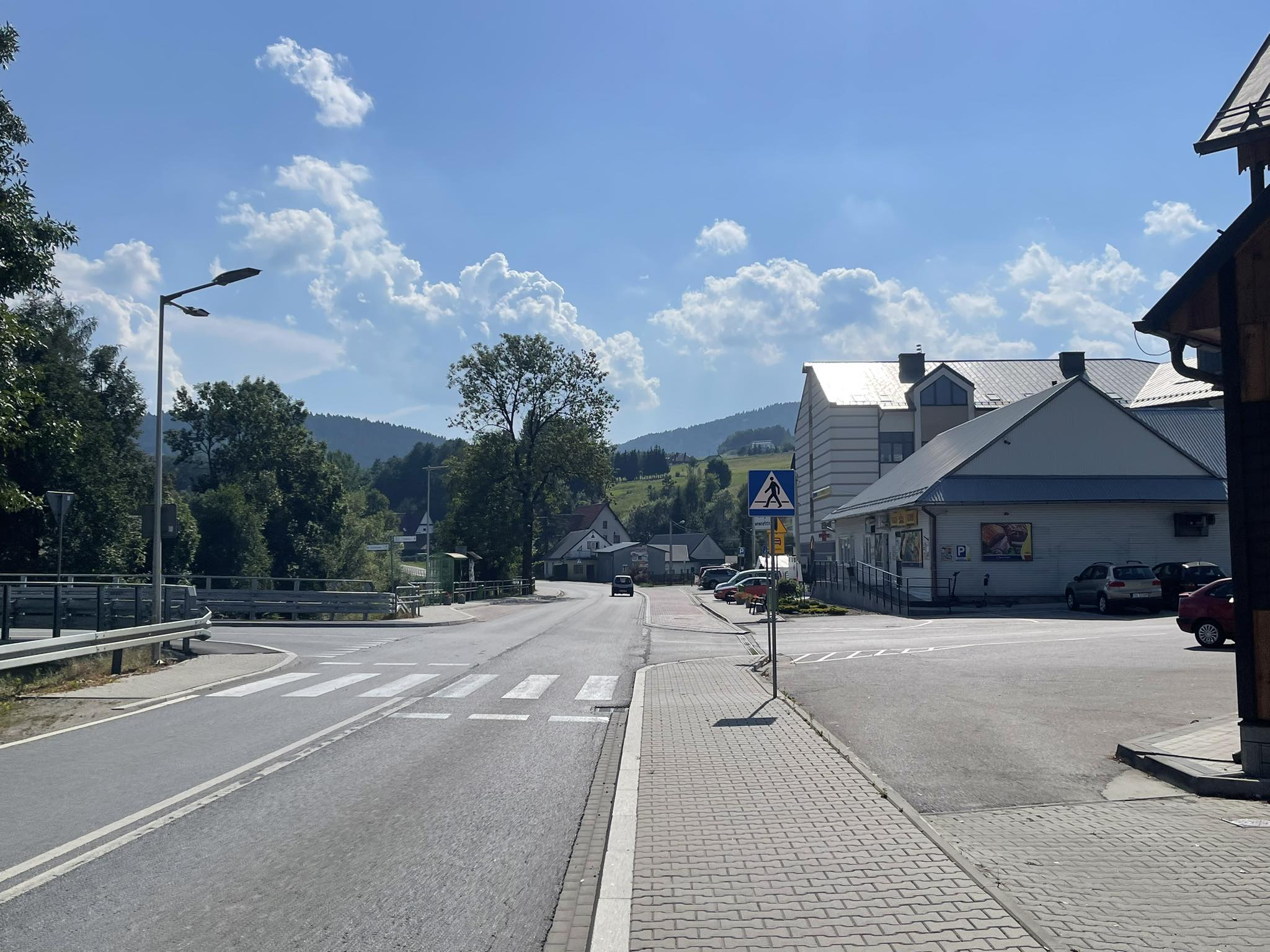

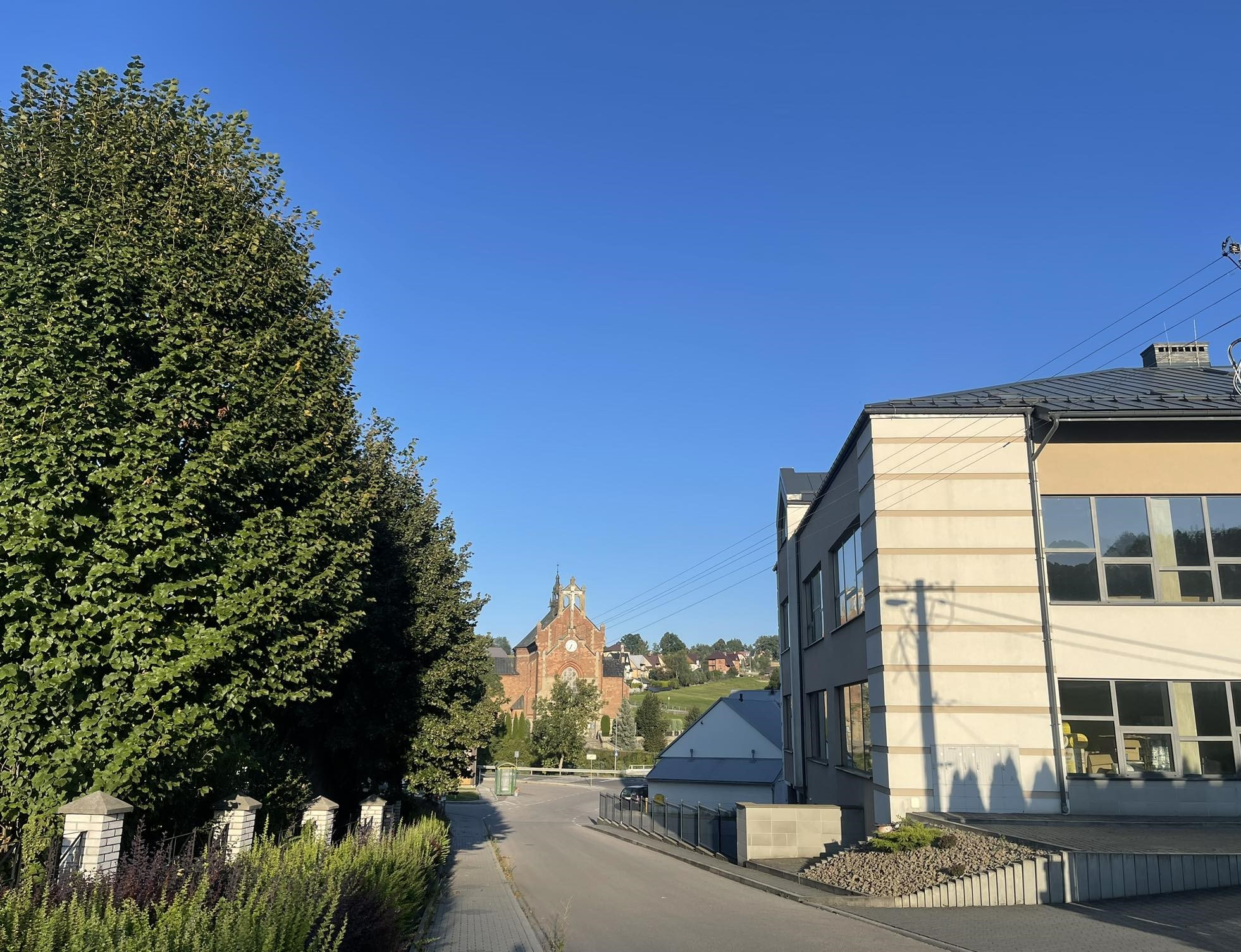

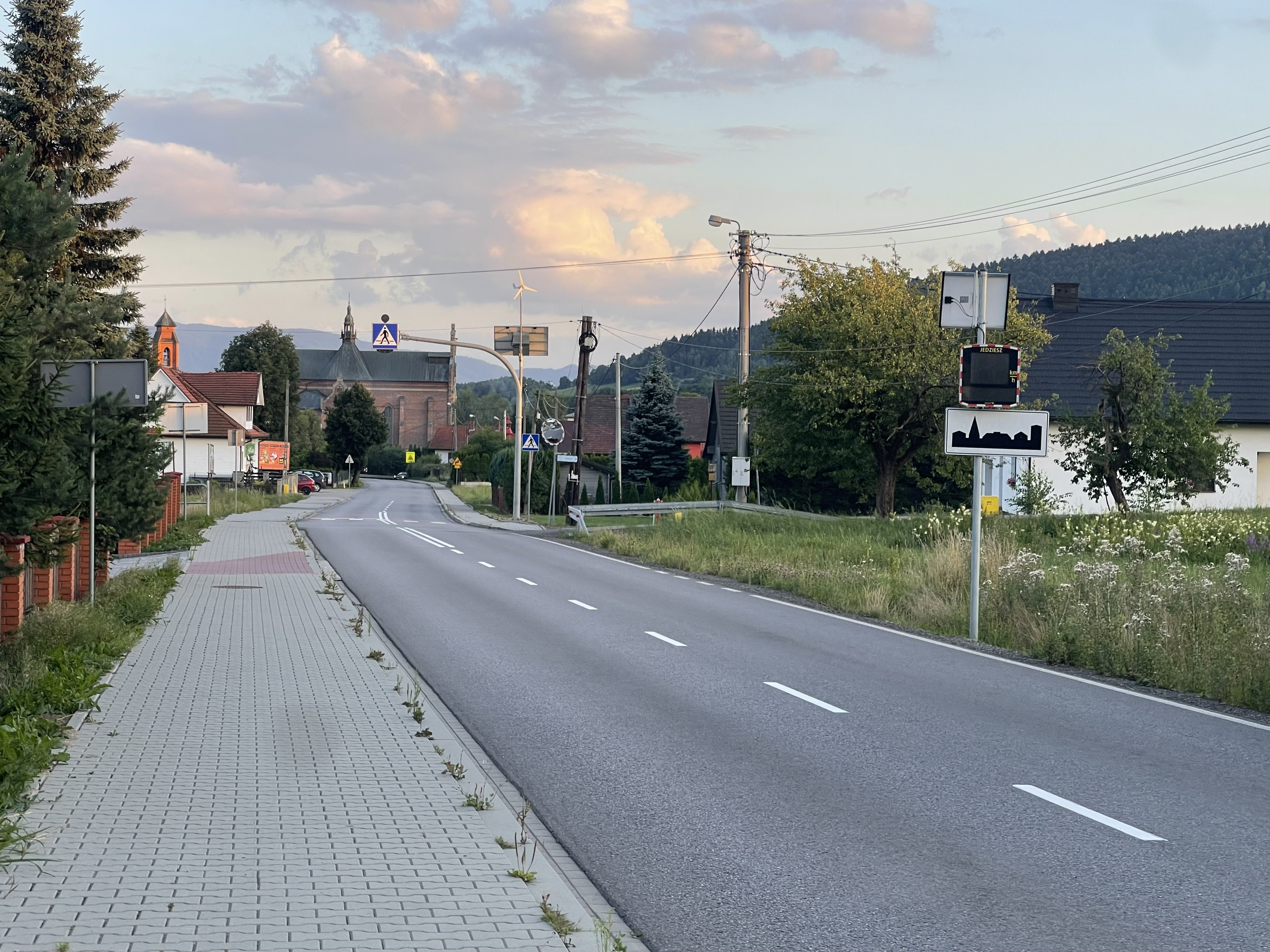
