= Tytus Czyżewski =

Polish artist

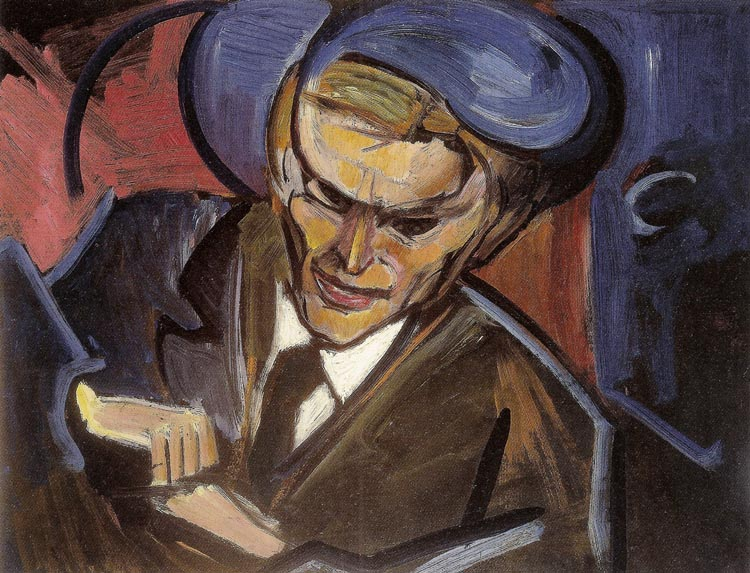
Portrait of Tytus Czyżewski by Leon Chwistek, 1920

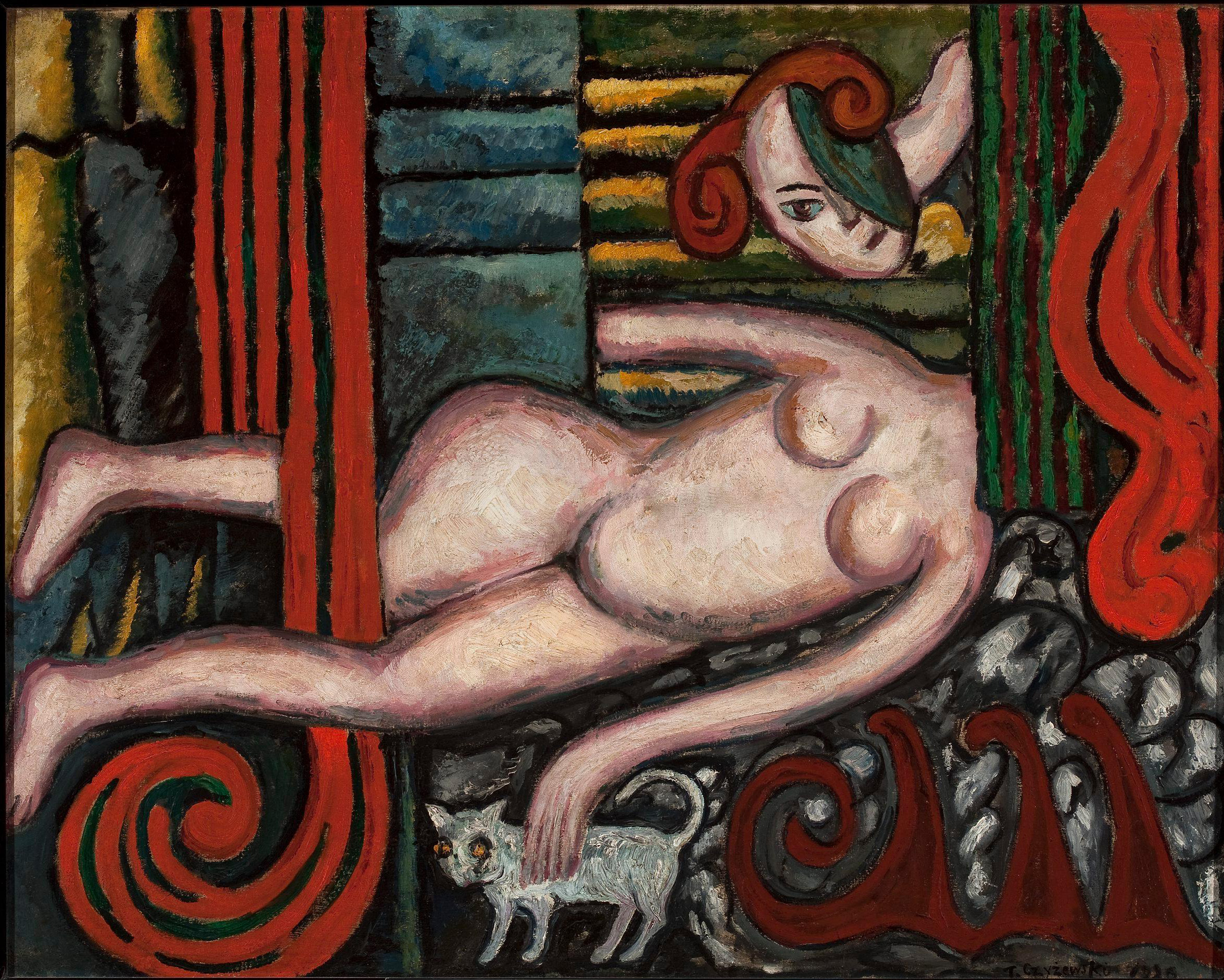
Tytus Czyżewski, Nude with Cat, 1920, National Museum in Warsaw

Tytus Czyżewski (28 December 1880 – 5 May 1945) was a Polish painter, art theoretician, Futurist poet, playwright, member of the Polish Formists and a Colorist.

== Biography ==
He was born in Przyszowa. In 1902 he studied at the Academy of Fine Arts in Krakow in the painting studios of Józef Mehoffer and Leon Wyczółkowski. Czyżewski travelled to Paris and learned from the artistic trends there. He began exhibiting in 1906. Czyżewski painting style was highly influenced by Cézanne and El Greco, whose work he admired until his death.

In 1917, with the brothers Zbigniew and Andrzej Pronaszko, he organized in Kraków an exhibition of Polish Expressionist works. The group later became known as the Polish Formists. Until the break-up of the Formists in 1922, he was the primary artist and theoretician behind the movement as well as the joint editor of the periodical Formiści. He was also co-founder of the Polish Futurist clubs, and published Futurist-inspired "visual poetry." After briefly flirting with Surrealism, Czyżewski spent the rest of his life as a Colorist. He died in 1945 in Kraków.

== Selected work ==
- Poetry:
  - Zielone Oko. Poezje formistyczne. Elektryczne wizje, 1920
  - Noc – dzień. Mechaniczny instynkt elektryczny, 1922
  - Pastorałki, 1925
  - Robespierre. Rapsod. Cinema. Od romantyzmu do cynizmu, 1927
  - Lajkonik w chmurach, 1936
- Prose:
  - A Burglar of the Better Sort: Plays, Verse, Theoretical Notes. Translated by Charles Kraszewski. Publisher: Glagoslav Publication, 2019.
