= Rita Sacchetto =

German dancer, actress, and screenwriter (1880–1959)

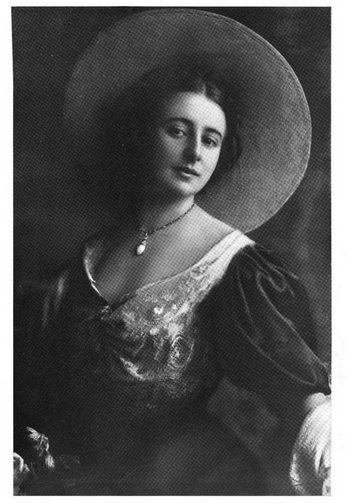
- Rita Sacchetto, from a 1909 publication
- Born: Margherita Sacchetto; 15 January 1880; Munich, German Empire
- Died: 18 January 1959 (aged 79); Nervi, Italy
- Occupations: Dancer, actress, screenwriter
- Years active: 1905–1924
- Spouse: August Zamoyski (m. 1917, divorced)

Margherita "Rita" Sacchetto (15 January 1880 – 18 January 1959) was a German dancer, film actress, and screenwriter.

== Early life ==
Margherita Sacchetto was born in Munich, in what was then the German Empire, on 15 January 1880. Her father was from Venice, and her mother was Austrian. She trained as a dancer in Munich.

== Career ==
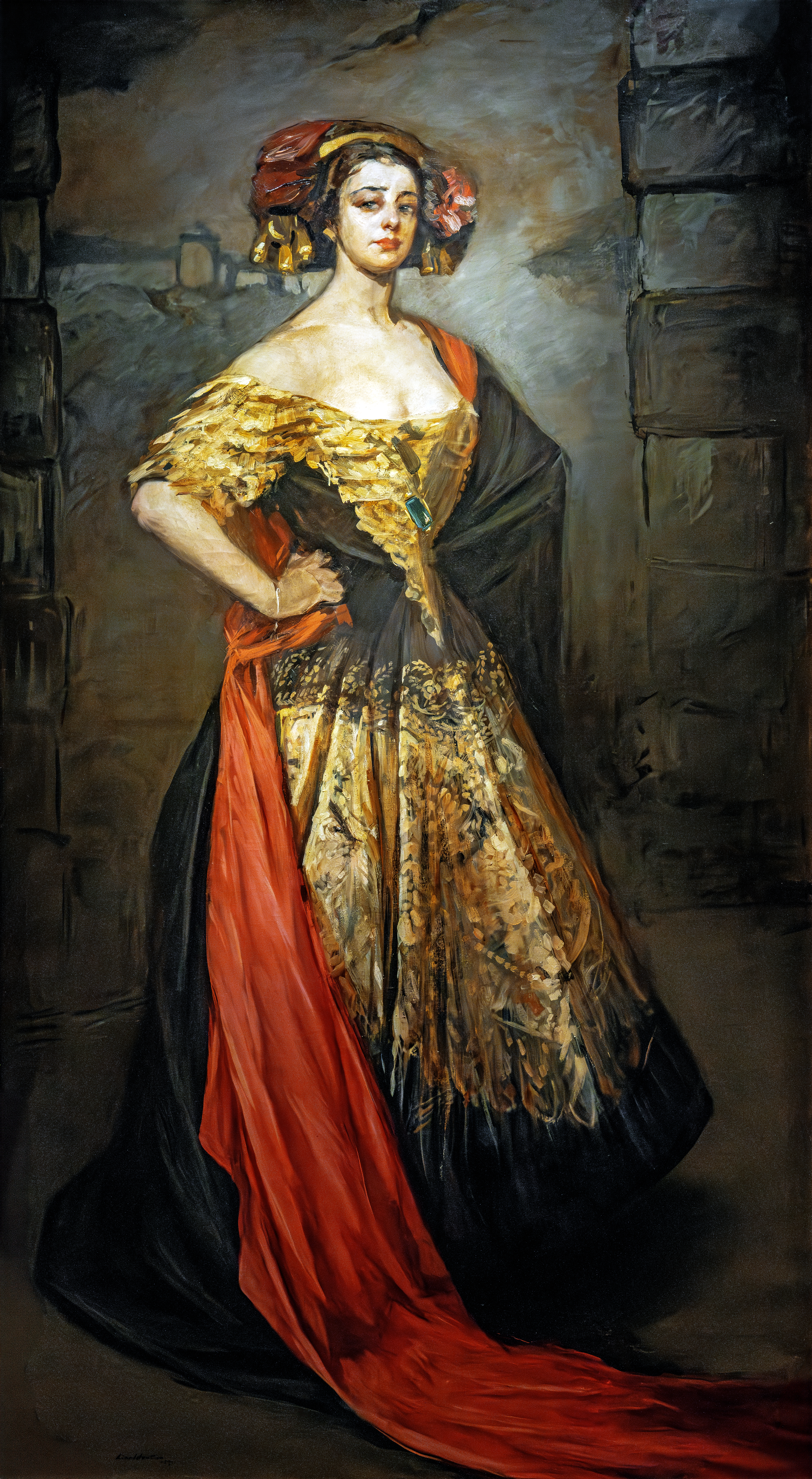
Rita Sacchetto 1911 – Lino Selvatico

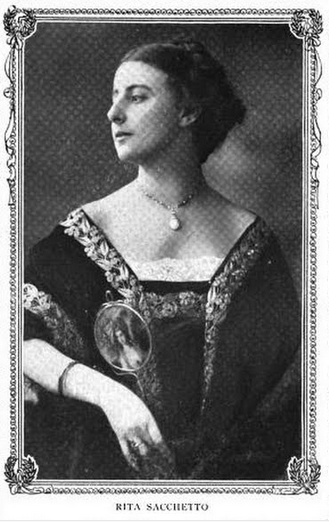
Rita Sacchetto, from a 1909 publication.

Sacchetto made her debut in 1905 at the Munich Künstlerhaus. Gustav Klimt and Koloman Moser designed the sets for her performance in 1906. She toured internationally from 1908 to 1910 with dancer Loie Fuller, including a show at the Metropolitan Opera in 1910, and a dance about women's suffrage set to the music of Edvard Grieg, performed at the New Theatre, also in 1910. She also ran a dance school in Berlin from 1916 to 1918, with students including Rahel Sanzara, Anita Berber, Hansi Burg, and Valeska Gert. Among her neighbors in Berlin was the scientist, Max Born, who recalled her as "a very beautiful woman" with "dazzling" students.

She was known for developing a style called tanzbilder, which involved novel dance interpretations of great works of art, with remarkable costumes designed by Sacchetto herself. Caroline V. Kerr of Theatre magazine described Sacchetto in 1909 as "wholly human, of fascinating naiveté, captivating in her exuberance of temperament, in her grace and charm." Ben Ali Haggin painted Sacchetto's portrait in one of her best-known costumes, titled "En Crinoline". At the peak of her dance career, she was a frequent guest of European royalty, including Queen Margherita of Savoy, Nicholas II of Russia's family, and Alfonso XIII of Spain.

She appeared in several Danish and German silent films, under contract to Nordisk Film, between 1913 and 1917. In the United States, she was known for her appearance in The Ghost of the White Lady (1914), and In the Line of Duty (1914). She wrote one film, En Død i Skønhed (1915), in which she also appeared.

== Later years ==
At age 37, Rita Sacchetto married in Vienna the 24-year-old Polish nobleman and sculptor August Zamoyski on 5 May 1917 Afterwards she moved with her husband to Zakopane, where in June 1920 she opened a school of dance and pantomime. In 1922, she went on tour of Europe performing dance and pantomime compositions described by critics as expressionistic and formistic. In 1924, Sacchetto was accidentally shot in the foot by one of her husband's friends, which stopped her public performances In 1930 the couple moved to Italy, where in 1930s she worked occasionally in Italian film productions. Sacchetto died in 1959, in Nervi, Italy, three days after her 79th birthday.
