= Jastrzębski =

Jastrzębski (Polish pronunciation: [jaˈstʂɛmpskʲi], feminine: Jastrzębska, plural: Jastrzębscy) is a Polish-language surname. It is a toponymic surname derived from one of the several Polish locations named Jastrzęby, Jastrzębie, Jastrząbki, etc. Ultimately derived from jastrząb, or "hawk". Variants include Jastrzembski, Jastrząbski, and Yastrzemski. It is Russified as Yastrzhembsky/Yastrzhembskaya (Russian: Ястржембский).

Notable people with this surname include:

- Andrzej Jastrzębski (born 1939), Polish jazz tuba player
- Bohdan Jastrzębski (1929–2000), Polish urbanist and politician
- Carl Yastrzemski (born 1939), American baseball player
- Chris Jastrzembski (born 1996), German footballer
- Dennis Jastrzembski (born 2000), German footballer
- Józef Jastrzębski (1920–1989), Polish ethnographer
- Maria Jastrzębska (born 1953), Polish-British poet
- Mike Yastrzemski (born 1990), American baseball player
- Mirosława Jastrzębska (1921–1982), Polish ethnographer
- Nikolaus von Jastrzembski, birth name of Nikolaus von Falkenhorst (1885–1968), German general
- Sergey Yastrzhembsky (born 1953), Russian politician
- Stanisław Jastrzębski, Polish writer
- Steve Jastrzembski (1939–2009), American football player
- Włodzimierz Jastrzębski (born 1939), Polish historian and a retired professor

== See also ==
- Jastrzębowski
