= Jastrzębie =

Jastrzębie may refer to:

- Jastrzębie, Brodnica County in Kuyavian-Pomeranian Voivodeship (north-central Poland)
- Jastrzębie, Lipno County in Kuyavian-Pomeranian Voivodeship (north-central Poland)
- Jastrzębie, Świecie County in Kuyavian-Pomeranian Voivodeship (north-central Poland)
- Jastrzębie, Lesser Poland Voivodeship (south Poland)
- Jastrzębie, Masovian Voivodeship (east-central Poland)
- Jastrzębie, Silesian Voivodeship (south Poland)
- Jastrzębie, Opole Voivodeship (south-west Poland)
- Jastrzębie, Pomeranian Voivodeship (north Poland)
- Jastrzębie-Zdrój in Silesian Voivodeship (south Poland)
