= Młyńczyska =

- Village
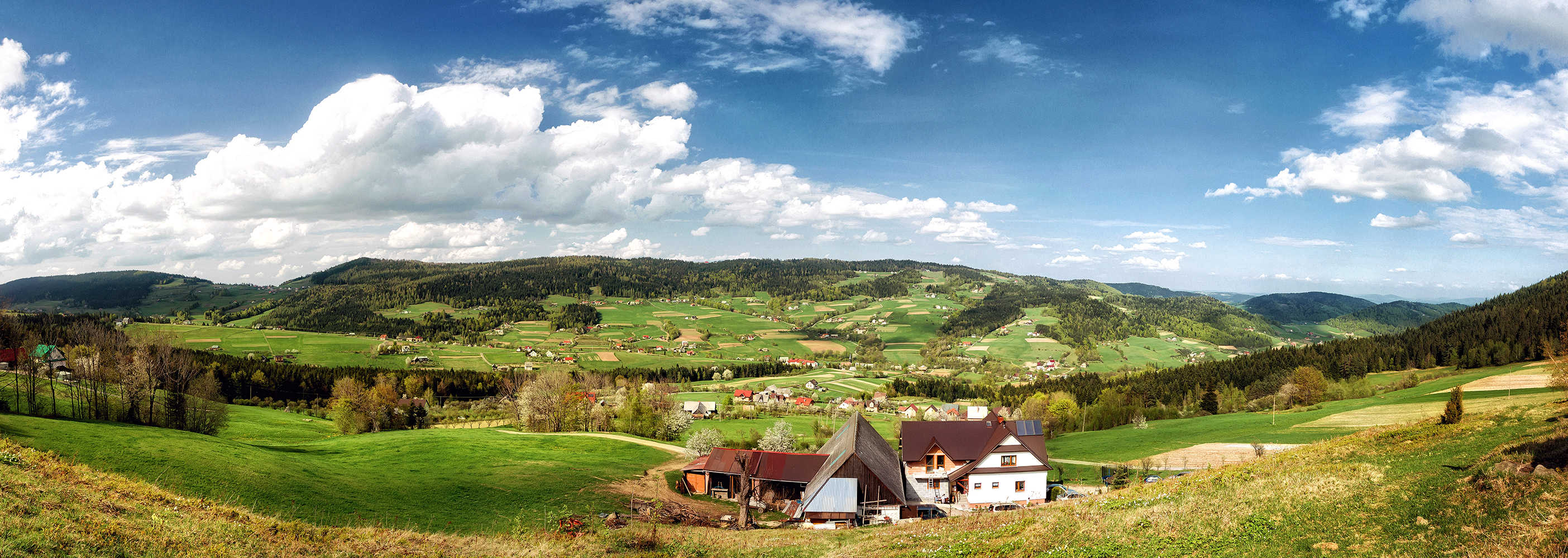

- Location within Poland
- Coordinates: 49°37′N 20°25′E
- Country: Poland
- Voivodeship: Lesser Poland
- County: Limanowa
- Gmina: Łukowica
- Population: 1,037
- Website: http://www.mlynczyska.republika.pl/

Młyńczyska [mwɨɲˈt͡ʂɨska] is a village in the administrative district of Gmina Łukowica, within Limanowa County, Lesser Poland Voivodeship, in southern Poland.
