= Michael Sendivogius =

Polish alchemist, philosopher, and medical doctor (1566–1636)

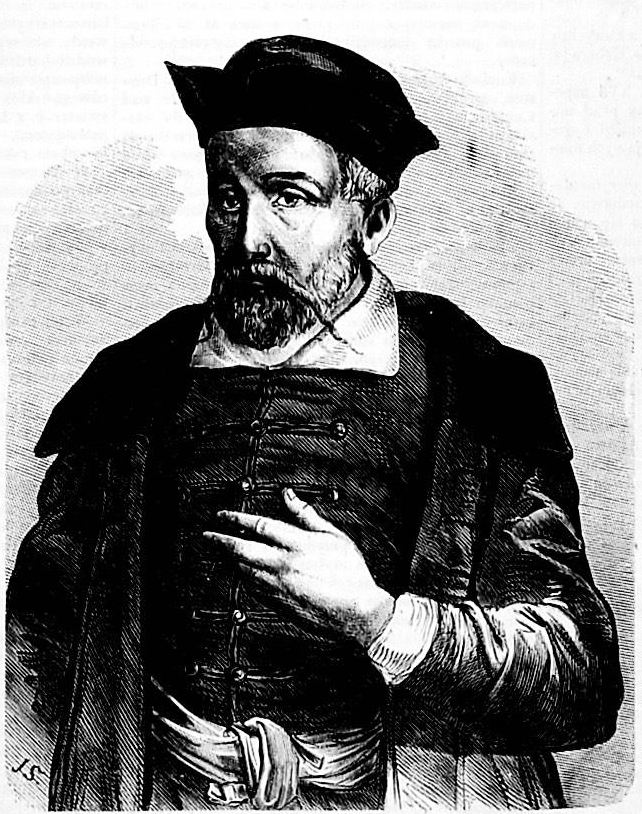
- Born: Michał Sędziwój; 2 February 1566; Łukowica, Kingdom of Poland (now Poland)
- Died: 1636 (aged 69–70); Kravaře, Crown of Bohemia, Holy Roman Empire (now the Czech Republic)
- Other names: Sędziwój, Sędzimir
- Education: University of Vienna, University of Altdorf, University of Leipzig, University of Cambridge
- Occupations: Alchemist, philosopher, writer, and medical doctor
- Known for: The concept of central nitre

Michael Sendivogius (/ˌsɛndɪˈvoʊdʒiəs/; Polish: Michał Sędziwój; 2 February 1566 – 1636) was a Polish alchemist, philosopher, and physician. A pioneer of chemistry, he developed ways of purifying and creating various acids, metals, and other chemicals.

He discovered that air is not a single substance and contains a life-giving substance – later called oxygen – 170 years before Scheele's discovery of the element. He correctly identified this "food of life" with the gas (also oxygen) given off by heating nitre (saltpetre). This substance, the "central nitre", had a central position in Sendivogius' schema of the universe.

== Biography ==
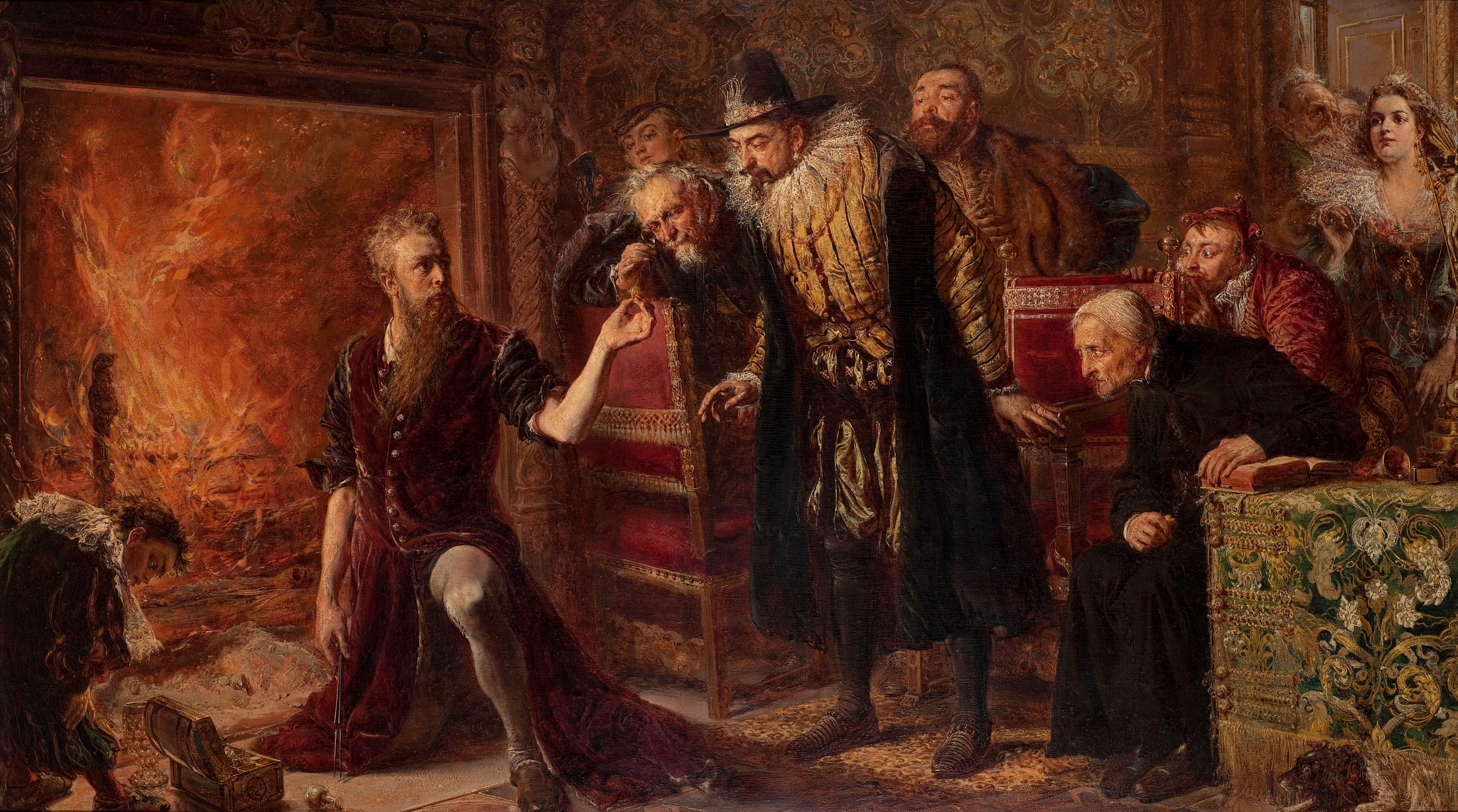
Alchemist Sendivogius, demonstrating alchemy to King Sigismund III of Poland, oil on board by Jan Matejko (1867).

Little is known of his early life: he was born into a noble family that was part of the Clan of Ostoja. His father sent him to study in university of Kraków but Sendivogius visited also most of the European countries and universities; he studied at Vienna, Altdorf, Leipzig and Cambridge. His acquaintances included John Dee and Edward Kelley. It was thanks to him that King Stephen Báthory agreed to finance their experiments. In the 1590s, he was active in Prague, at the famously open-minded court of Emperor Rudolf II.

In Poland, he appeared at the court of King Sigismund III Vasa around 1600, and quickly achieved great fame, as the Polish king was himself an alchemy enthusiast and even conducted experiments with Sendivogius. In Kraków's Wawel castle, the chamber where his experiments were performed is still intact. The more conservative Polish nobles soon came to dislike him for encouraging the king to expend vast sums of money on chemical experimentation. The more practical aspects of his work in Poland involved the design of mines and metal foundries. His widespread international contacts led to his employment as a diplomat from about 1600.

In his later years, Sendivogius spent more time in Bohemia and Moravia (now in the Czech Republic), where he had been granted lands by the Habsburg emperor. Near the end of his life, he settled in Prague, in the court of Rudolf II, where he gained even more fame as a designer of metal mines and foundries. However the Thirty Years' War of 1618-48 had effectively ended the golden age of alchemy: the rich patrons now spent their money on financing war rather than chemical speculation, and he died in relative obscurity.

== Works ==
Daniel Stolcius in his Viridarium Chymicum (1624) praises Sendivogius as the author of twelve books. The most famous of these was his "New Chemical Light", published in 1604. Besides a relatively clear exposition of his theory on the existence of a "food of life" in air, his books contain various scientific, pseudo-scientific and philosophical theories, and were repeatedly translated and widely read among such worthies as Isaac Newton into the 18th century.

== Sendivogius in fiction ==
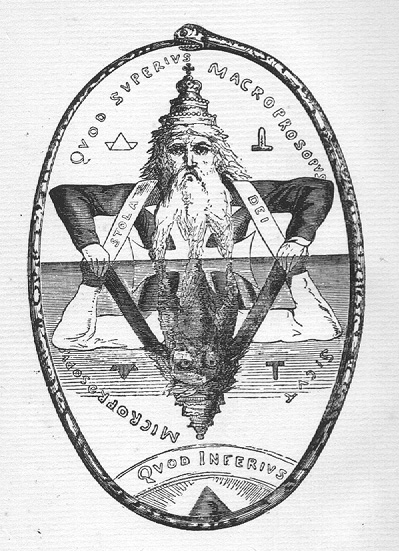
Illustration from the book Sędziwój by Józef Bohdan Dziekoński, 1896 edition

The first appearance of this character in fiction was in the 1845 book Sędziwoj by Józef Bohdan Dziekoński, a writer during the times of romanticism in Poland. In early 2000s he appeared in several books by the Polish writer Andrzej Pilipiuk (Kuzynki 2003, Księżniczka 2004, Dziedziczki 2005). Sendivogius is also a character in the novel of Gustav Meyrink (part of Goldmachergeschichten, August Scherl Verlag, Berlin 1925), a German author from Prague, Bohemia, who often wrote about alchemy and alchemists.

The Polish 19th-century realist painter Jan Matejko depicted Sendivogius demonstrating a transmutation of a base metal into gold before King Sigismund III Vasa.

He was also shown (thinly disguised) as the Alchemist Sendivogius in a Polish TV series Alchemik Sendivius in the 1980s.

The Guild secretary of the Guild of Alchemists in the Discworld universe is named Mr. Sendivoge in the novel Men at Arms.

== Writings ==
- De Lapide Philosophorum Tractatus duodecim e naturae fonte et manuali experientia deprompti. 1604.
  - Also known as Novum Lumen Chymicum (New Chemical Light), the first Latin editions were published simultaneously in Prague and Frankfurt.
- Dialogus Mercuriii, Alchemistae et Naturae. Cologne, 1607.
- Tractatus de sulphure altero naturae principio. Cologne, 1616.

== See also ==
- Alchemy in art and entertainment
- List of multiple discoveries, 17th century.
