= Gmina Łukowica =

Gmina Łukowica Łukowica Commune
- Gmina
- Coat of arms
- Interactive map of Gmina Łukowica
- Coordinates (Łukowica): 49°37′N 20°29′E
- Country: Poland
- Voivodeship: Lesser Poland
- County: Limanowa
- Seat: Łukowica

Area
  - Total: 69.71 km^{2} (26.92 sq mi)

Population (2006)
  - Total: 9,285
  - Density: 133.2/km^{2} (345.0/sq mi)
- Website: http://www.lukowica.iap.pl

Gmina Łukowica is a rural gmina (administrative district) in Limanowa County, Lesser Poland Voivodeship, in southern Poland. Its seat is the village of Łukowica, which lies approximately 11 kilometres (7 mi) south-east of Limanowa and 63 km (39 mi) south-east of the regional capital Kraków.

The gmina covers an area of 69.71 square kilometres (26.9 sq mi), and as of 2006 its total population is 9,285.

In 2008 Łukowica was selected along with 19 other European villages in Germany, Poland, Italy and Spain for the Spanish documentary Film "Villages of Europe" (Pueblos de Europa), produced by Juan Frutos (Colours Communication Group) and Orange Productions S.L.

According to the Ministry of Finance, as of 2014 Łukowica was the poorest gmina in Poland.

== Villages ==
Gmina Łukowica contains the villages of Jadamwola, Jastrzębie, Łukowica, Młyńczyska, Owieczka, Przyszowa, Roztoka, Stronie, Świdnik

== Neighbouring gminas ==
Gmina Łukowica is bordered by the gminas of Kamienica, Łącko, Limanowa and Podegrodzie.
