= Jastrzębowski =

Jastrzębowski, feminine: Jastrzębowska, plural: Jastrzębowscy is a Polish-language surname. It may be phonetically spelled as Jastrzembowski/Jastrzembowska. It is a toponymic surname derived from one of the several Polish locations named Jastrzębowo and literally meaning "one from Jastrzębowo". Ultimately derived from jastrząb, or "hawk". It is Russified as Yastrzhembovsky / Yastrzhembovskaya (Russian: Ястржембовский).

Notable people with this surname include:

- Janusz Jastrzębowski, drummer of Polish band Artrosis
- Jerzy Jastrzębowski (born 1951), Polish footballer and manager
- Wojciech Jastrzębowski (1799–1882), Polish scientist, naturalist and inventor, professor of botanic, physics, zoology and horticulture

== See also ==
- Jastrzębski
