= Yastrzemski (surname) =

Yastrzemski, Yastrzemsky, Yastrzhembsky, etc., are surnames, transliterations of the Polish surname Jastrzębski. Notable people with the surname include:

- Carl Yastrzemski (born 1939), American baseball player
- Mike Yastrzemski (born 1990), American baseball player, and grandson of Carl
- Sergey Yastrzhembsky (born 1953), Russian politician
