= August Zamoyski =

Polish sculptor

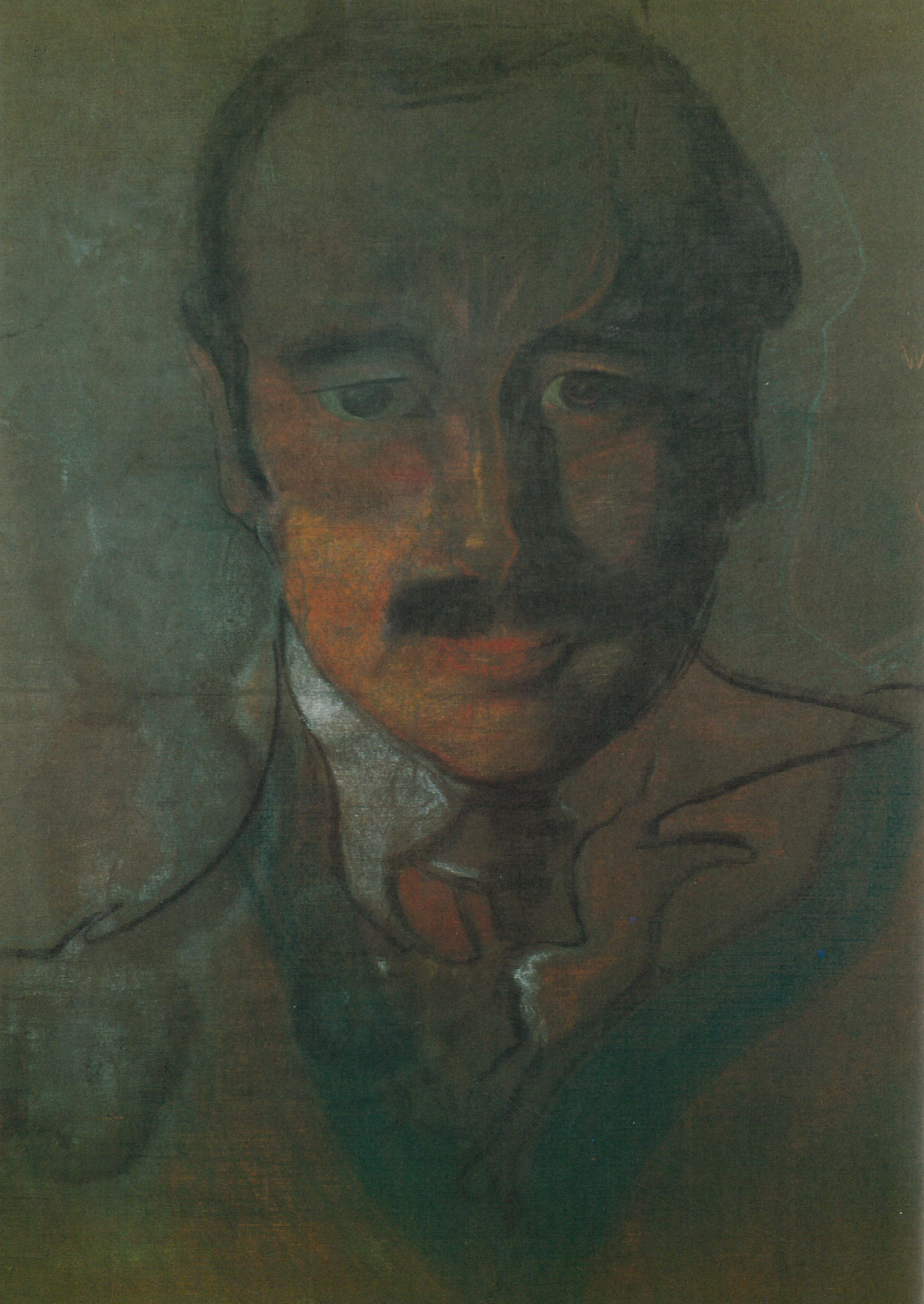
- Portrait of August Zamoyski by Witkacy.
- Born: 28 June 1893; Jabłoń, Lublin Voivodeship, Poland
- Died: 19 May 1970 (aged 76); Saint-Clar-de-Rivière, France
- Known for: Sculpture
- Spouse: Rita Sacchetto (m. 1917, divorced)

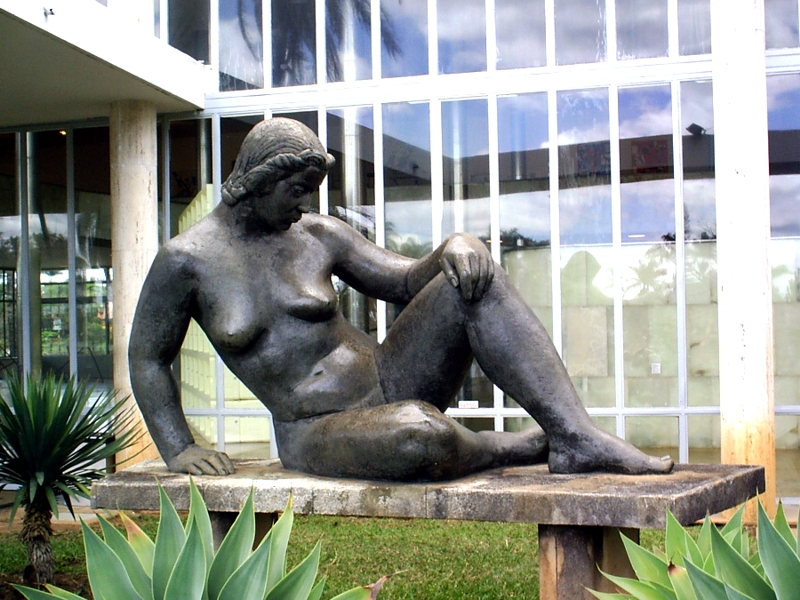
Nu, sculpture by Zamoyski, Museu de Arte da Pampulha, Belo Horizonte, Brasil

Count August Zamoyski (28 June 1893 – 19 May 1970) was a Polish sculptor, member of groups Bunt and Formiści.

Zamoyski was an author of stone compositions in simplified and geometrised form. His first works were influenced by French cubism and Italian futurism. In 1920s he developed his own, monumental style in which he referred to Classicism. In his last period, Zamoyski was an author of expressive religious works.

== Selected works ==
- Ich dwoje (c. 1917)
- Leopold Zborowski portrait (1924)
- Akt (1928)
- Głowa Wierki (1928)
- Frédéric Chopin monument, Rio de Janeiro, Brazil (1944)
- Assis Chateaubriand monument, São Paulo, Brazil (c. 1950)
