= Jadamwola =

- Village
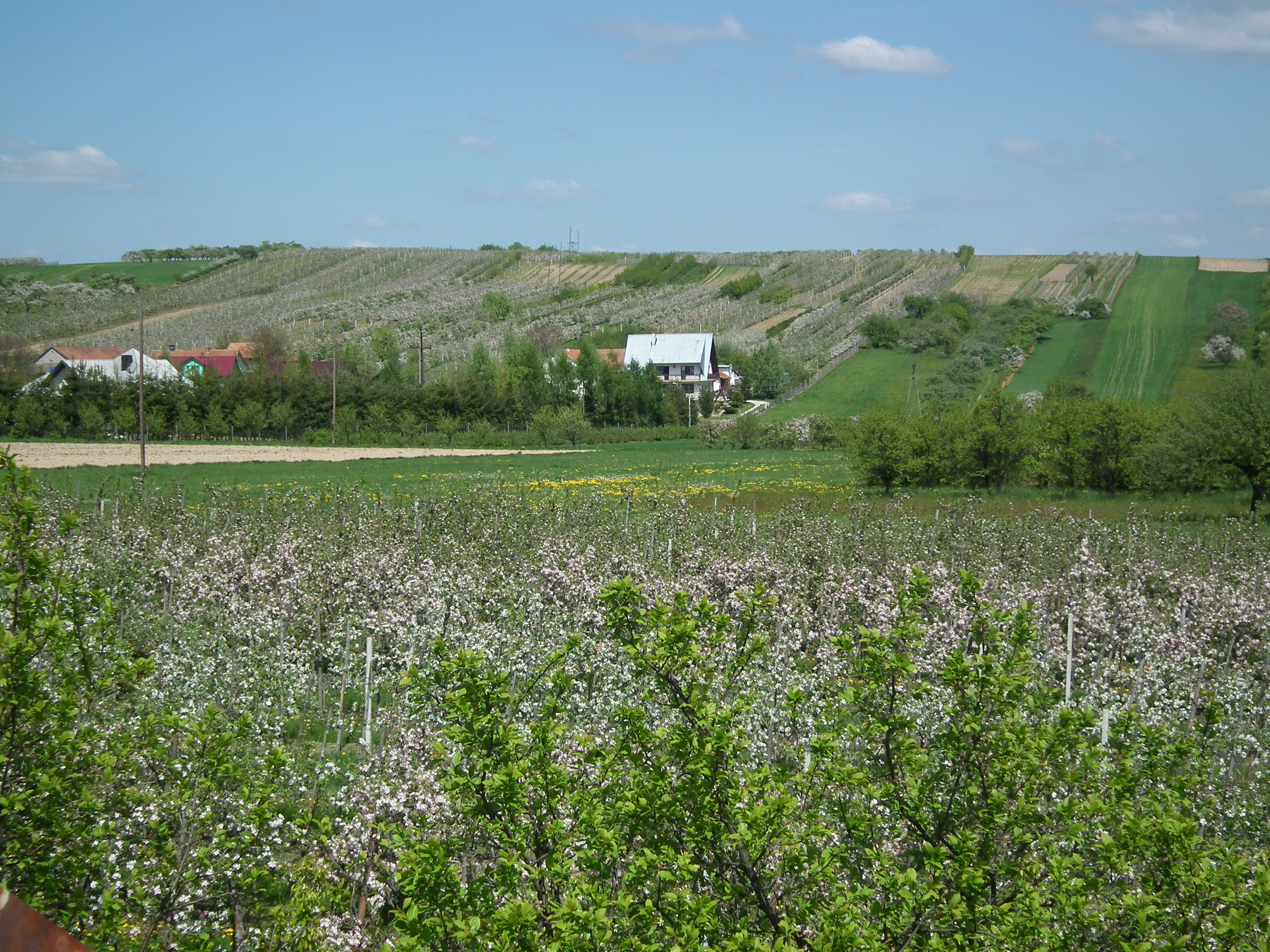

- Location within Poland
- Coordinates: 49°35′N 20°29′E
- Country: Poland
- Voivodeship: Lesser Poland
- County: Limanowa
- Gmina: Łukowica
- Population: 500

Jadamwola [jadamˈvɔla] is a village in the administrative district of Gmina Łukowica, within Limanowa County, Lesser Poland Voivodeship, in southern Poland.
