= Zbigniew Pronaszko =

Painter, sculptor, set designer (1885–1958)

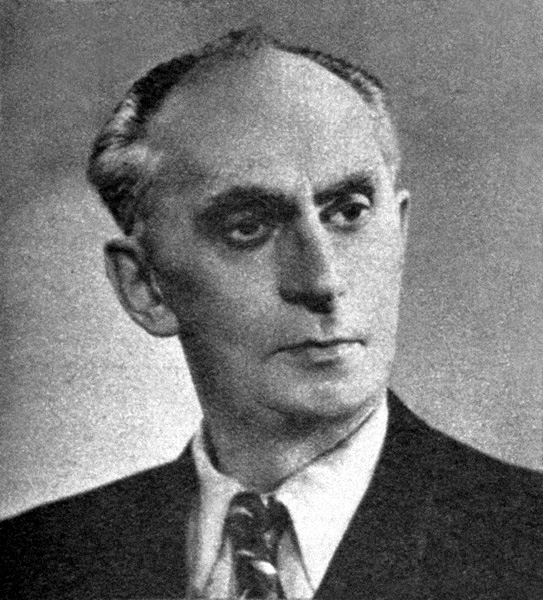
- Zbigniew Pronaszko, 1949
- Born: 27 May 1885; Derebczyn
- Died: 18 February 1958 (aged 72); Kraków
- Occupations: Painter, sculptor, set designer

Zbigniew Pronaszko (27 May 1885 – 18 February 1958) was a painter, sculptor and set designer.

== Biography ==
Son of Franciszek Pronaszko and Feliksa Bona née Sawicka; brother of Andrzej Pronaszko. From 1906 to 1911 he studied painting in Kraków; his teachers included Teodor Axentowicz and Jacek Malczewski.

== Awards ==
- Order of the Banner of Labour, 1st class (31 May 1955)
- Order of the Banner of Labour, 2nd class (22 July 1949)
- Commander's Cross of the Order of Polonia Restituta (15 July 1954)
- Medal of the 10th Anniversary of People's Poland (28 February 1955)
