= Roztoka, Limanowa County =

Roztoka
- Village
- Location within Poland
- Coordinates: 49°37′N 20°27′E
- Country: Poland
- Voivodeship: Lesser Poland
- County: Limanowa
- Gmina: Łukowica

Roztoka [rɔsˈtɔka] is a village in the administrative district of Gmina Łukowica, within Limanowa County, Lesser Poland Voivodeship, in southern Poland.
