= Łukowica =

- Village
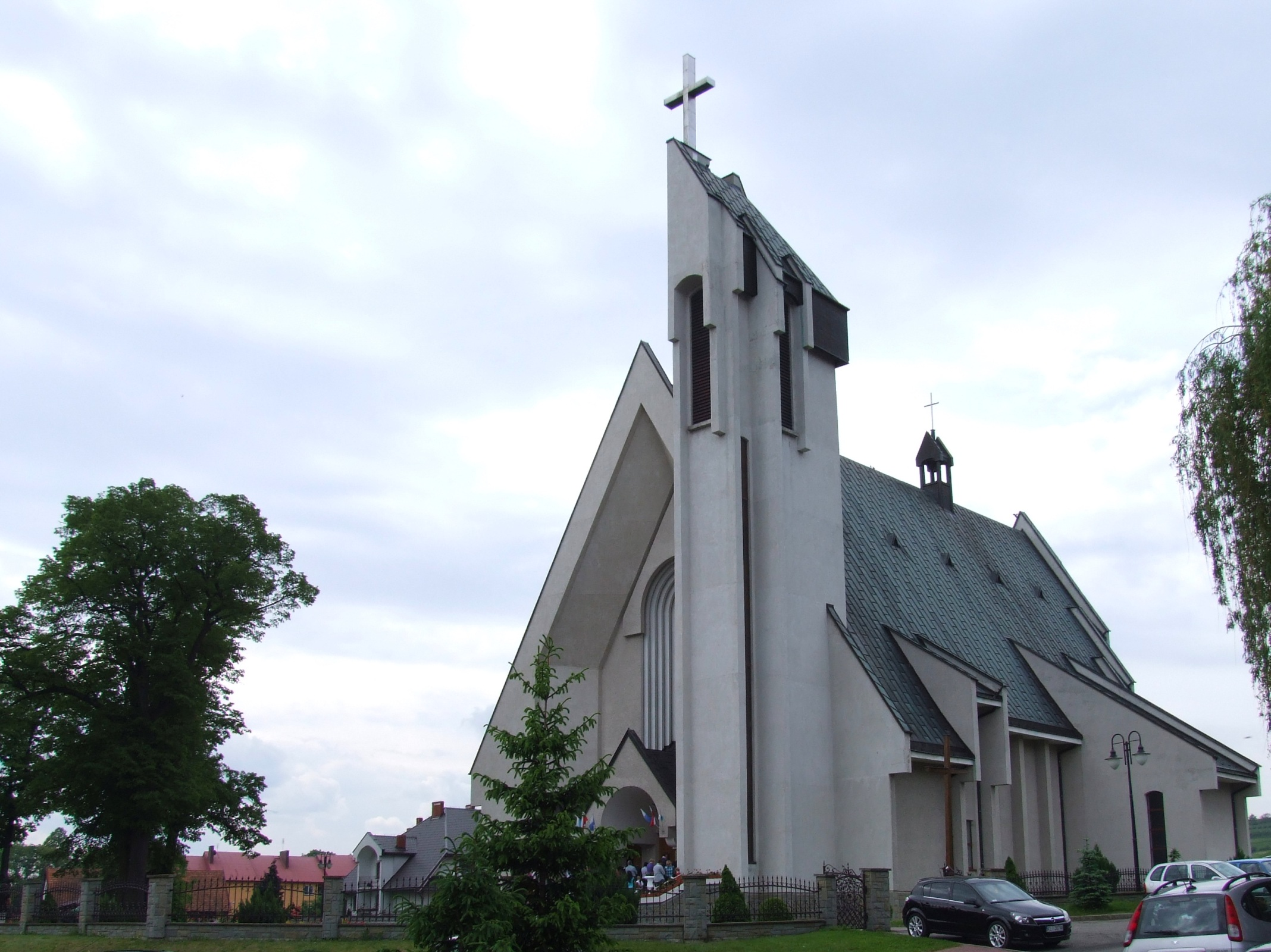
- Mary Help of Christians Church

- Coat of arms

- Location within Poland
- Coordinates: 49°37′N 20°29′E
- Country: Poland
- Voivodeship: Lesser Poland
- County: Limanowa
- Gmina: Łukowica
- Elevation: 310 m (1,020 ft)

Population
  - Total: 2,220

Łukowica [wukɔˈvit͡sa] is a village in Limanowa County, Lesser Poland Voivodeship, in southern Poland. It is the seat of the gmina (administrative district) called Gmina Łukowica.

The village is the birthplace of Michael Sendivogius (1566–1636), a Polish alchemist, philosopher, and medical doctor.

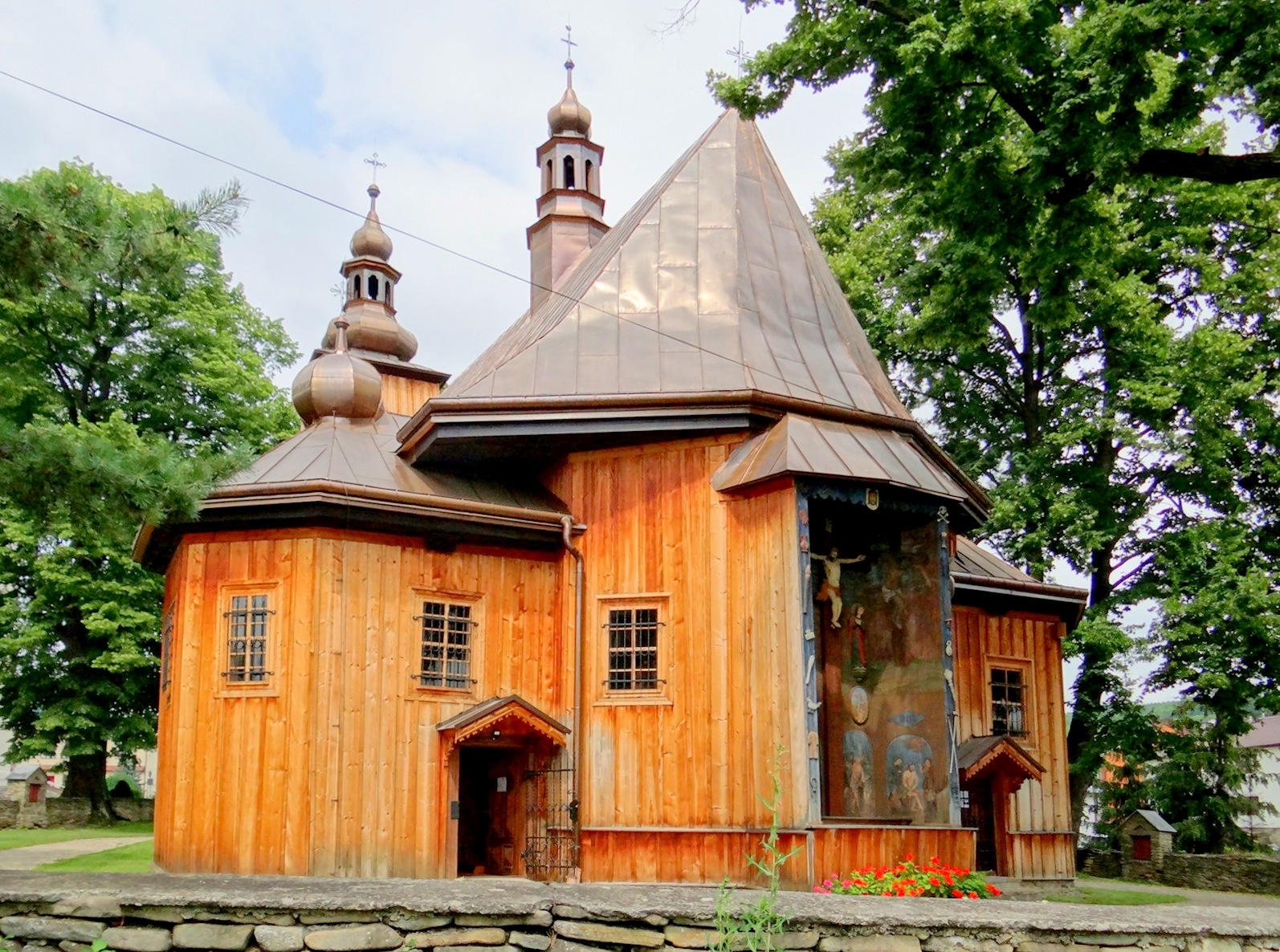
Saint Andrew Church

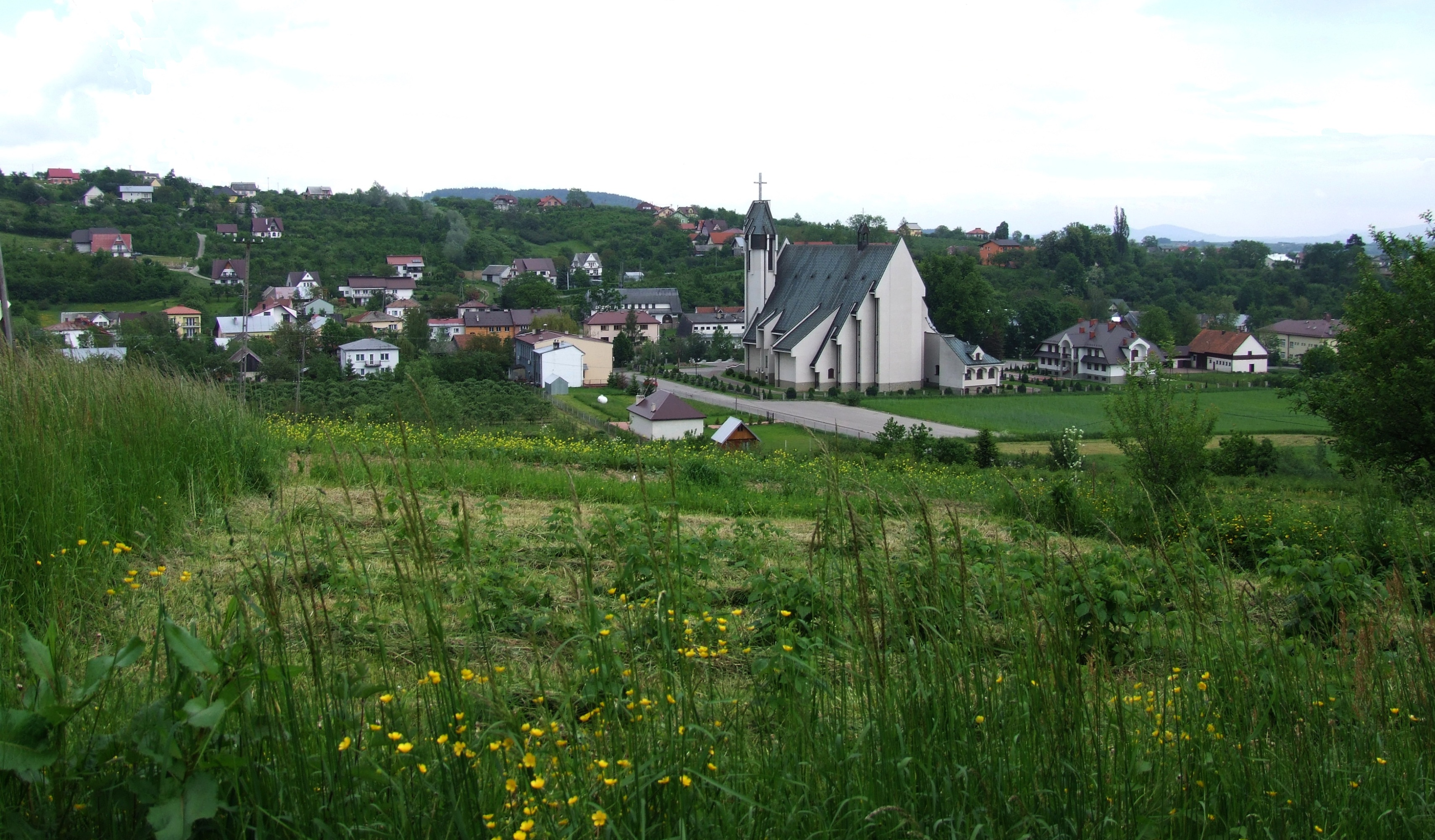
View of Łukowica
