= Jastrzębie, Lesser Poland Voivodeship =

Jastrzębie
- Village
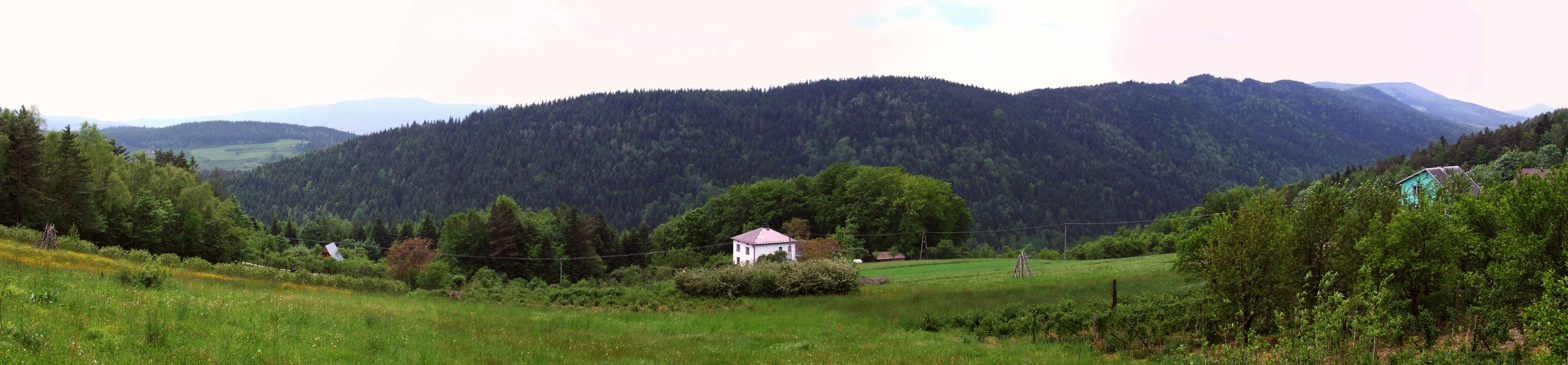

- Location within Poland
- Coordinates: 49°36′N 20°29′E
- Country: Poland
- Voivodeship: Lesser Poland
- County: Limanowa
- Gmina: Łukowica
- Time zone: UTC+1 (CET)
  - Summer (DST): UTC+2 (CEST)
- Vehicle registration: KLI

Jastrzębie [jasˈtʂɛmbjɛ] is a village in the administrative district of Gmina Łukowica, within Limanowa County, Lesser Poland Voivodeship, in southern Poland. It is situated on the Jastrząbka River, a tributary of the Dunajec River. It lies approximately 17.4 km (11 mi) southwest of Limanowa.

== History ==
Following the German-Soviet invasion of Poland, which started World War II in September 1939, the village was occupied by Germany until 1945. The Polish resistance was present in the area. In 1944 the Peasant Battalions seized grain from a local storehouse as part of a nationwide effort to prevent the Germans from shipping food out of Poland.
