= Stronie, Limanowa County =

Stronie
- Village
- Location within Poland
- Coordinates: 49°36′40″N 20°31′30″E
- Country: Poland
- Voivodeship: Lesser Poland
- County: Wadowice
- Gmina: Stryszów
- Elevation: 580 m (1,900 ft)
- Population: 940

Stronie [ˈstrɔɲɛ] is a village in the administrative district of Gmina Łukowica, within Limanowa County, Lesser Poland Voivodeship, in southern Poland.
