= Świdnik, Limanowa County =

Świdnik
- Village
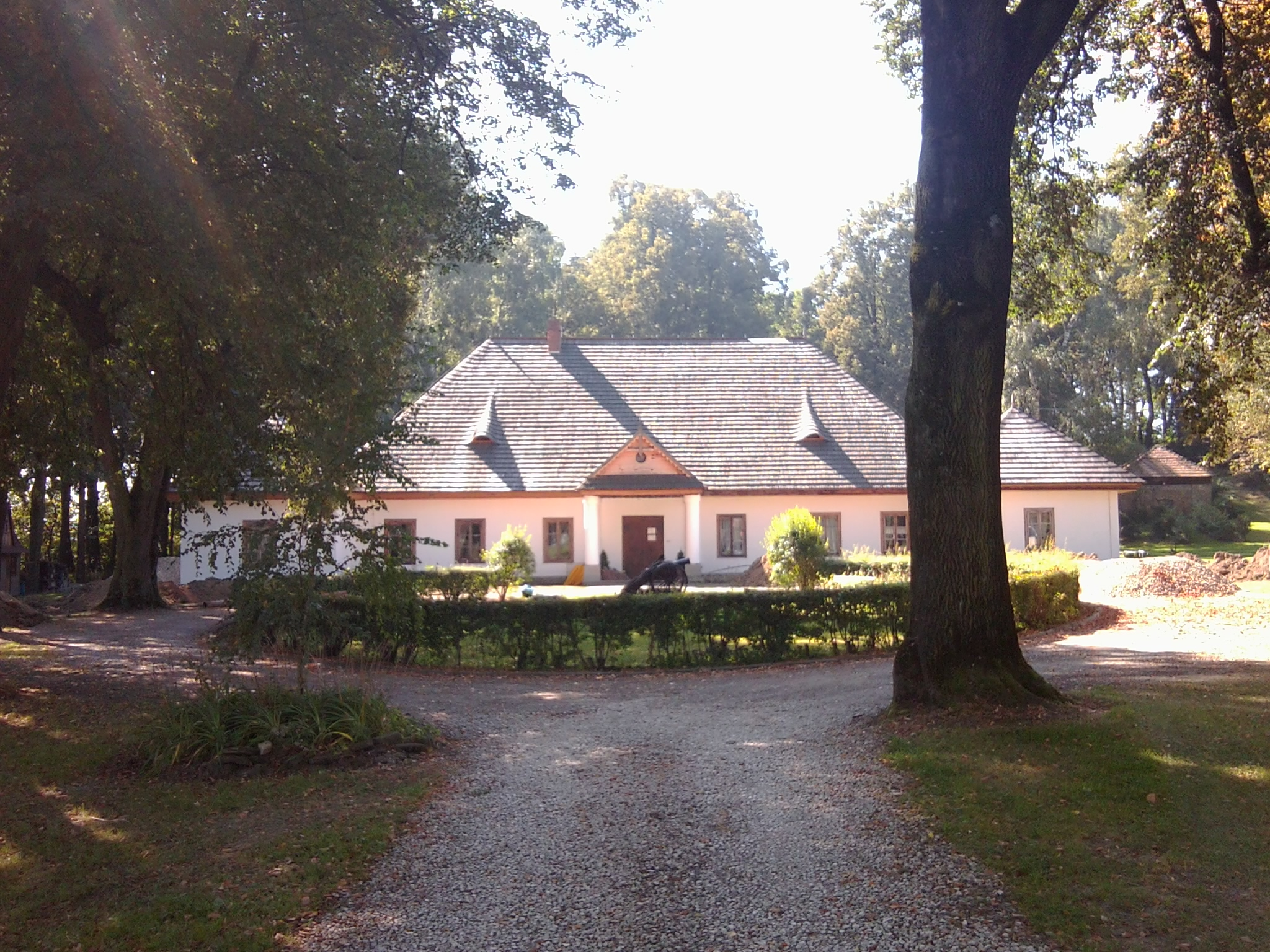

- Location within Poland
- Coordinates: 49°36′05″N 20°31′07″E
- Country: Poland
- Voivodeship: Lesser Poland
- County: Limanowa
- Gmina: Łukowica
- Population (approx.): 600

Świdnik (Polish pronunciation: [ˈɕfidɲik]) is a village in the administrative district of Gmina Łukowica, within Limanowa County, Lesser Poland Voivodeship, in southern Poland.

The village has an approximate population of 600.
