= Formizm =

Polish avant-garde literary and artistic movement

- Publication by Leon Chwistek titled Tytus Czyżewski a kryzys formizmu (Tytus Czyżewski and the Crisis of Formism)
- Years active: 1917-1922
- Location: Second Polish Republic
- Influences: Cubism; Expressionism; Folk art; Futurism

Formizm (English: Formism) was an avant-garde literary and artistic movement active in the Second Polish Republic between 1917 and 1922. Formerly known as Polish Expressionism, it drew inspiration from Cubism, Expressionism and Futurism as well as Polish folk art. Together with Unism, started by Władysław Strzemiński in the early 1920s, Formism was one of the two independently Polish avant-garde movements.

== History ==
The movement began in 1917 in Kraków where several artists united under the banner of Polish Expressionists. Their first exhibition was organized at the Society of Friends of Fine Arts in Kraków on 4 November 1917. In 1919, a year after Poland had regained its independence, the group adopted the name Formiści (Formists), reflecting their interest in examining the question of form in visual art and an intention to move beyond Expressionism. The Formists opposed naturalism in painting and wished to incorporate influences from other Western avant-garde movements, particularly Cubism in France and Futurism in Italy, to create an independent Polish movement. To that end, the Formists incorporated various elements of Polish folk, including motifs from glass painting from the Podhale region. Beyond Kraków, the movement was also active in Warsaw, Lwów and Poznań.

Between 1919 and 1921, the group published a periodical titled Formiści (The Formists) which "became a platform for the exchange of progressive ideas developed in parallel across Europe"' and facilitated connections between Western and Central and Eastern European modern artists. Its members included Leon Chwistek, Tytus Czyżewski, Zbigniew Pronaszko, Andrzej Pronaszko, Konrad Winkler, August Zamoyski, Jan Hrynkowski, Tymon Niesiołowski, Jacek Mierzejewski, Zygmunt Radnicki and Stanisław Ignacy Witkiewicz, among other writers and visual artists.

== See also ==
- Kapists
