= Andrzej Pronaszko =

Polish painter and scenographer

- Andrzej Pronaszko
- Born: 31 December 1888; Derebchyn, modern-day Ukraine
- Died: 15 January 1961 (aged 72); Warsaw, Poland
- Occupations: Painter, co-founder of Polish avant-garde in the 1920s

Andrzej Pronaszko (31 December 1888 in Derebchyn – 15 January 1961 in Warsaw) was a Polish painter and scenographer, one of the most prominent representatives of the Young Poland movement and the Polish avant-garde of the 1920s and 1930s, Zbigniew Pronaszko's brother.

In occupied Poland, Pronaszko was a member of the Polish resistance, and a director of the Department of Microphotography at the Bureau of Information and Propaganda of Armia Krajowa. He was also involved with the underground theatre.

After the war Pronaszko became the lecturer at the Academy of Theatre in Warsaw (Akademia Teatralna im. Aleksandra Zelwerowicza).

== Notes and references ==
- Irena Kossowska, Monika Mokrzycka-Pokora; "Andrzej Pronaszko", Kultura polska, Instytut Adama Mickiewicza, 2006
- "PRONASZKO, Andrzej (1888-1961)", Encyclopedia INTERIA.PL "Wiedza" 1999-2010
