= Nowy Sącz Castle =

Coordinates: 49°37′44″N 20°41′21″E

Nowy Sącz Royal Castle
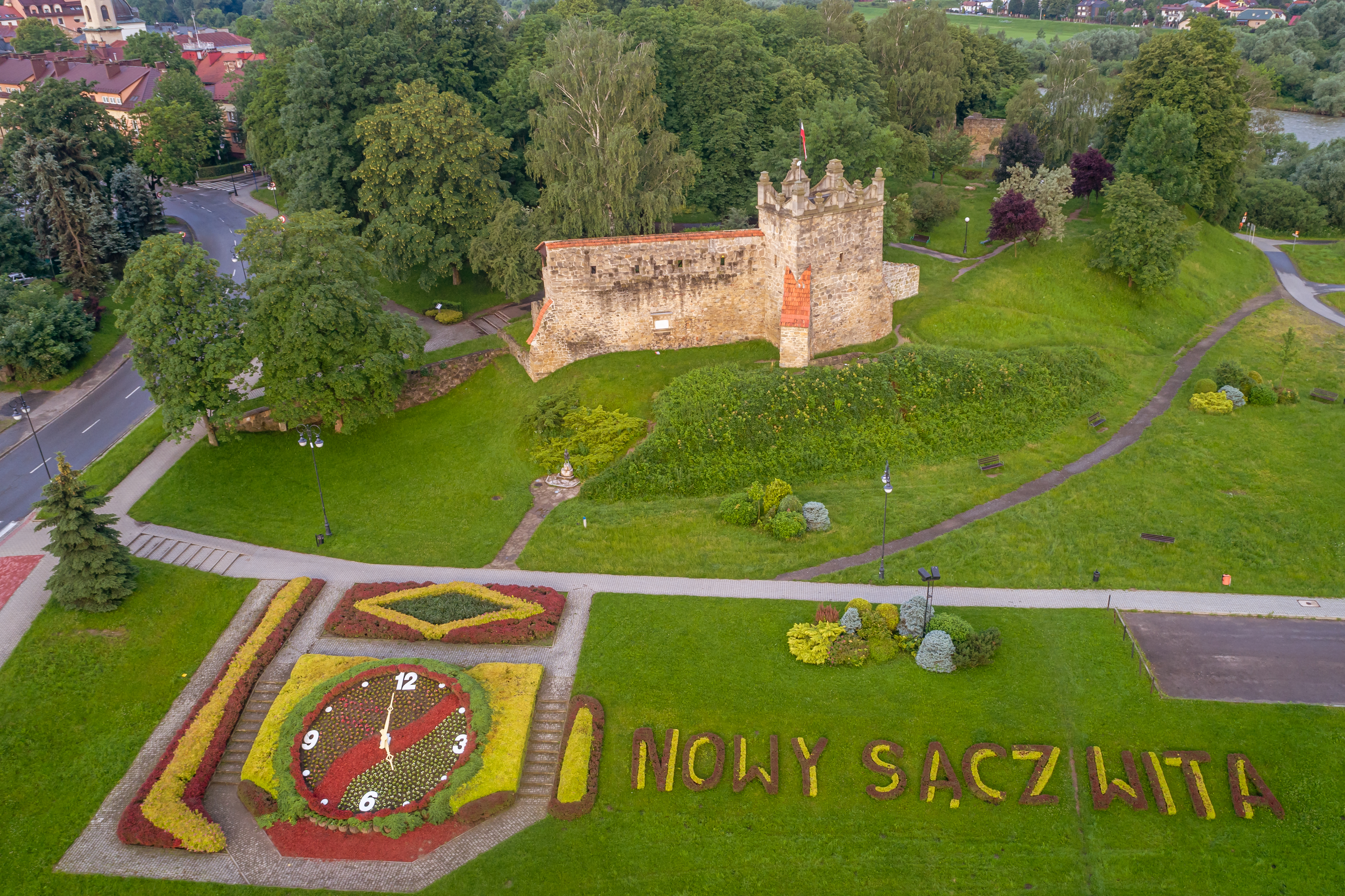
- Interactive map of the Nowy Sącz Royal Castle area

General information
- Architectural style: Polish Gothic-Mannerism
- Location: Nowy Sącz, Poland
- Construction started: 1350
- Completed: 1360
- Demolished: 1655, 1945
- Client: Casimir III the Great

The Nowy Sącz Royal Castle is a mediaeval castle in the city of Nowy Sącz in Poland. The partially restored ruins of the castle date back to the 14th century during the reign of Casimir III the Great.

== History ==
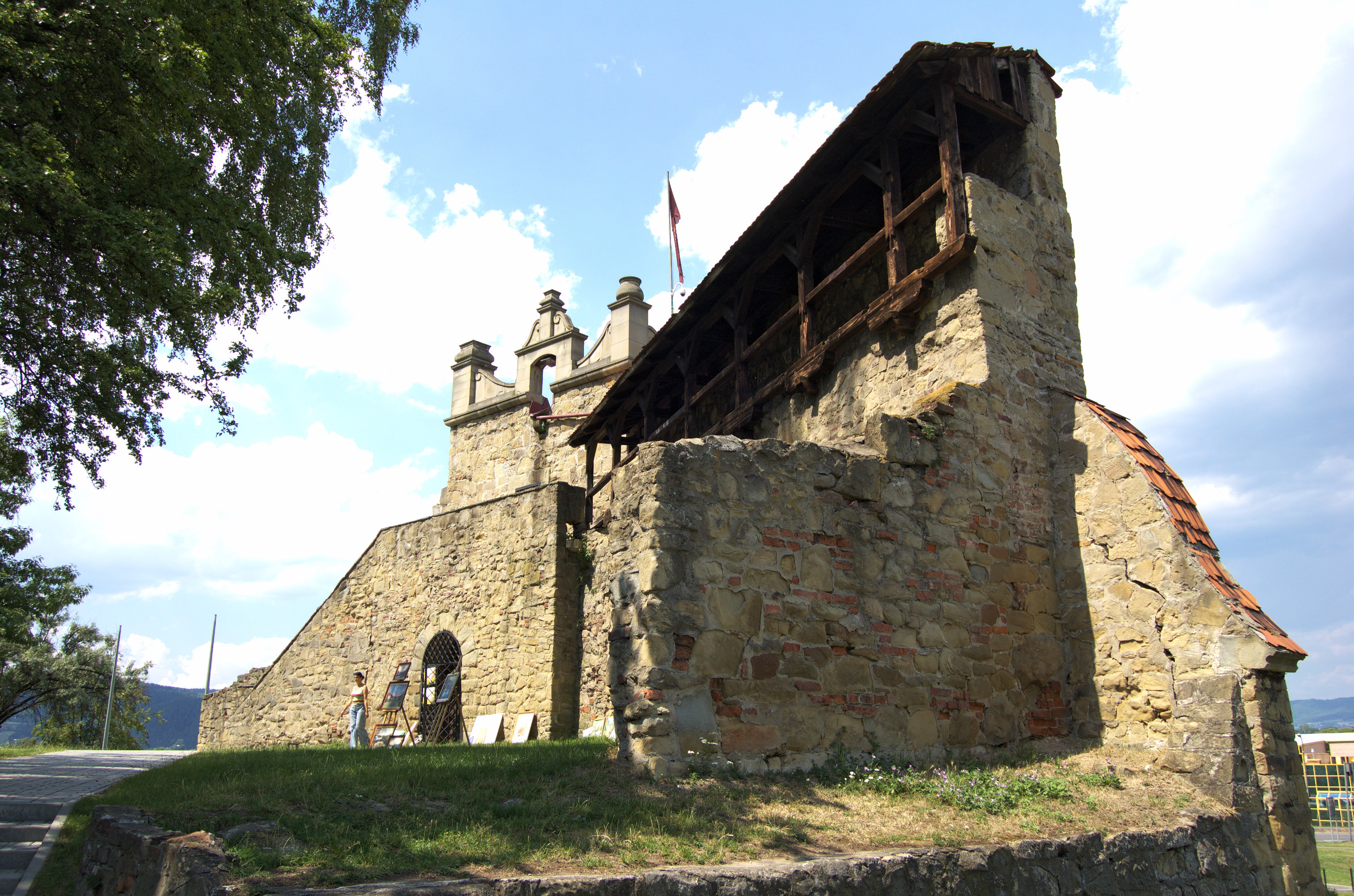
Tower in 2008

The edifice was built by king Casimir the Great in 1350–1360 on a slope within the fortifications of Nowy Sącz, at the confluence of two rivers Dunajec and Kamienica. Initially the castle had two corner towers, a keep and a residential building. The structure was separated from the city by a moat and a wall.

Among the notable inhabitants were king Louis I of Hungary and Saint Queen Jadwiga of Anjou. A frequent visitor to the castle was Jogaila (king Władysław Jagiełło). In the following centuries the castle hosted fewer Polish monarchs and became the seat of local starosta. Between 1611 and 1615 the castle was reconstructed in the mannerist style for Sebastian and Stanisław Lubomirski according to design by Maciej Trapola. The castle had already 40 well equipped rooms at that time. During the Deluge in 1655 the castle was almost completely destroyed by Swedish-Brandenburgian troops. Since that time, the uninhabited building began to fall into disrepair.

The structure was destroyed again in 1945, at the end of World War II, when it was used as a German ammunition store and was the site of mass executions. There are also the remains of the city walls nearby.

== See also ==
- List of mannerist structures in Southern Poland
- Dunajec river castles
- Castles in Poland
