= Kiełbasa (surname) =

- Pronunciation: [kʲɛwˈbasa]

Origin
- Language: Polish
- Meaning: sausage
- Region of origin: Poland

Kiełbasa (Kielbasa without diacritics and other variants) is a Polish surname literally meaning "sausage" (kielbasa).

Notable people with the name Kiełbasa/Kielbasa include:

- Max Kielbasa (1921–1980), American football player
- Oliwia Kiołbasa (born 2000), Polish chess player
- Peter Kiołbassa (1837–1905), Chicago politician
- Wincenty Kiełbasa (1425–1479), Polish Catholic priest and bishop of Chełm
- Władysław Kiełbasa (1893–1939), Polish Army officer
