= Multimedia City =

Multimedia City (Polish: Miasteczko Multimedialne) an innovative project, that has been realized in Nowy Sącz, in southern Poland. It has started in 2006, on the initiative of leaders and alumnus from WSB-NLU (Wyższa Szkoła Biznesu — National Luis University), with Krzysztof Pawlowski and Krzysztof Wnek at the head of. The Multimedia City's main goal is to initiate the cooperation between science and business in testing, incubating and commercialization of innovative projects of new technologies idea to economy.

== Project mission ==
The aim of the Multimedia City Project is to establish in Nowy Sącz Center of Innovation working in the field of multimedia and informative system. The strategic goal of Multimedia City is to become one of the most innovative centers in the world, which are working on application of multimedia in education, business and entertainment. The individual elements of Multimedia City are enabling to implement innovation to economy in accordance with the following stages of innovation chain: fresh ideas and innovative know-how, testing ideas through research and development phase, and implementation and adaptation of the innovative solutions in enterprises.

== Current activities ==
The following elements of Multimedia City currently operate:

- Business Incubator MEDIA 3.0, which within 2 years will invest around 3 mln € in the development of innovative start-ups from the field of IT and multimedia.
- Animation and 3D Graphics School Drimagine.
- The Cluster of Multimedia and Information Systems (MultiCluster), that consists of over 60 innovative and highly specialized small and medium-sized companies from the new technologies & new media businesses all over Poland. The Cluster of Multimedia and Information Systems aim is to support and integration of small and medium enterprises sector in the area. Mentioned firms act in multimedia and information systems market – so called " creative industry” – and Research and Development Sector.

Numerous companies like Microsoft, CISCO or Lewiatan Business Angels already cooperate with the innovative project from Nowy Sacz.

== Realization ==
The following are elements of Multimedia City that will operate with the realization of the project:

- Technology Park — a complex of buildings (16 thousand square meter) containing laboratories providing the most modern equipment indispensable to do research and developmental works in the field of multimedia and IT.
- Research and Development Centre — will carry a range of activities focused on searching for multimedia new applications. In the centre the ideas created, among other things, in the Cluster of Multimedia and Information Systems will be developed. Infrastructure and equipment will enable research and testing of any multimedia or IT project in the R&D Centre laboratories.
- Business Incubator — will enable the new, innovative ideas in the field of multimedia to be expanded. Furthermore, the ideas will be developed coming from different sources such as Research and Development Centre, firms, students and trainees who carry out studies using Multimedia City infrastructure and facilities.
- Multicluster.

== Multimedia technology support ==
The following are areas of multimedia technologies that the project strongly supports:

- Mobile Technologies such as creation of localization service system and authorization systems based on the integrated technology of internet services.
- Computer animation 3D used in computer games, special effects in films, visualization of data and simulations.
- Computer games used in education, business and entertainment.
- Internet, development of technologies such as Web 2.0, CSS, PHP, Java to be used in different purposes and fields.
- E-marketing, e-advertising, use of multimedia in marketing and advertisement.
- E-learning, increasing multimedia technology usage in education.

== Technology Park ==
On 24 August 2010, Multimedia City signed an agreement with the Polish Agency for Enterprise Development for a bailout to build the Technology Park. Multimedia City will be given 25 mln € for its infrastructure. Thanks to the European funds from the Innovative Economy Operation Program (indicative list) the modern research and development infrastructure of the Technology park will be built till 2012. That investment will provide a chance for Nowy Sącz to become the Polish Innovation Valley.

In September 2010, building of a complex infrastructure for the Technology Park (16 thousand square meter) has started. In Multimedia City's main building will be found specialist technology laboratories of amongst others: 3D and special effects, virtual reality, post-production, sound, motion capture as well as modern offices surface.
