= Nowy Sącz =

- City county
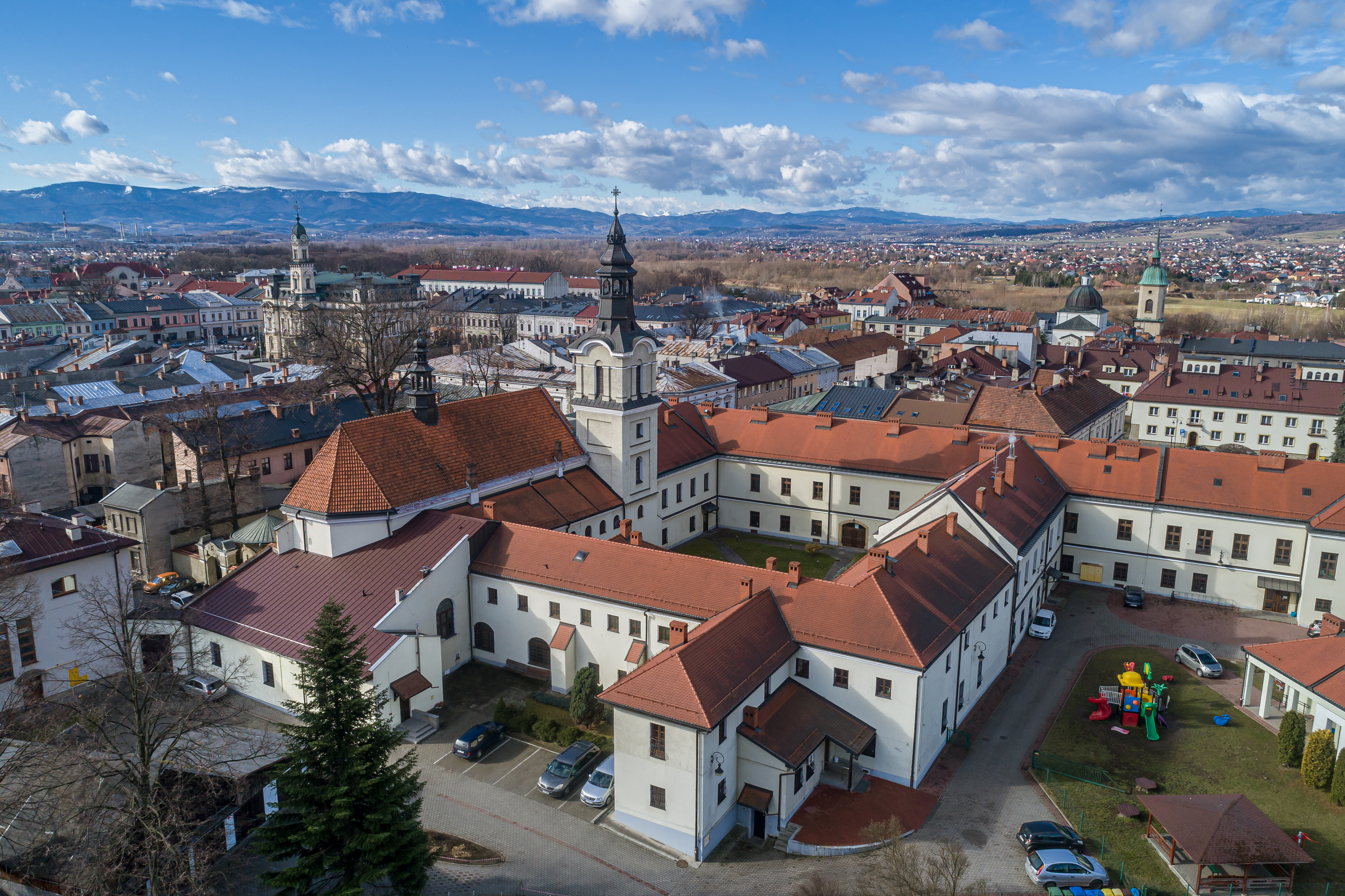
- Aerial view of Nowy Sącz, with the Jesuit Monastery at the front.

- Flag Coat of arms
- Interactive map of Nowy Sącz
- Location within Poland
- Coordinates: 49°37′26″N 20°41′50″E
- Country: Poland
- Voivodeship: Lesser Poland
- County: city county
- Established: 1292
- City rights: 1292

Government
  - City mayor: Ludomir Handzel (OKS)

Area
  - Total: 57 km^{2} (22 sq mi)
- Elevation: 281 m (922 ft)

Population (31 December 2021)
  - Total: 83,116 ▼
- Time zone: UTC+1 (CET)
  - Summer (DST): UTC+2 (CEST)
- Postal code: 33–300 to 33–308, 33–310, 33–320
- Area code: +48 18
- Car plates: KN
- Website: www.nowysacz.pl

Nowy Sącz (Polish pronunciation: [ˈnɔvɨ ˈsɔnt͡ʂ]; Hungarian: Újszandec; Yiddish: צאַנז, romanized: Tsanz; Slovak: Nový Sonč) is a city in the Lesser Poland Voivodeship of southern Poland. It is the district capital of Nowy Sącz County as a separate administrative unit. With a population of 83,116 as of 2021, it is the largest city in the Beskid Sądecki Region as well as the third most populous city in the Lesser Poland Voivodeship.

== Names ==
Nowy Sącz has been known in German as Neu Sandez (older spelling Neu Sandec) and in Hungarian as Újszandec. The Rusyn name was Novyj Sanc. Its Yiddish names include צאַנז (Tsanz) and נײַ-סאַנץ (Nay-Sants).

== History ==
Nowy Sącz was founded on 8 November 1292 by the Polish and Bohemian ruler Wenceslaus II, on the site of an earlier village named Kamienica. The foundation of Nowy Sącz took place due to the efforts of Bishop of Kraków, Paweł of Przemanków, who owned Kamienica. Upon request of the bishop, Wenceslaus II granted it Magdeburg rights, making it the only Polish town founded by the Bohemian king. Its name was taken from the nearby town of Stary Sącz. As early as 1329, the name was spelled Nowy Sandacz.

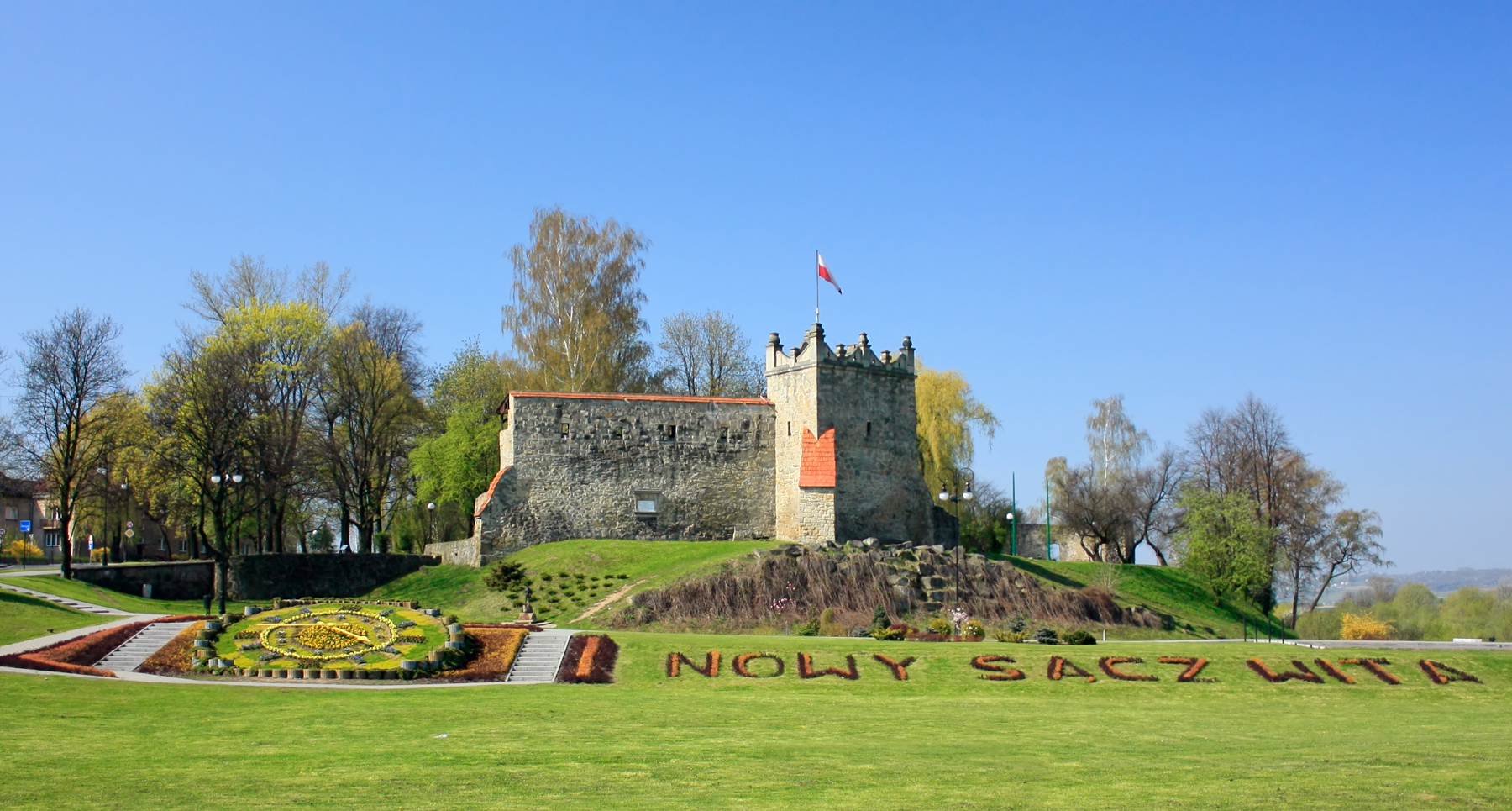
Ruins of the Royal Nowy Sącz Castle

In the 14th and 15th century Nowy Sącz emerged as one of the most important economic and cultural centres of this part of the Kingdom of Poland. The town benefited from its proximity on the trade route to Hungary due to privileges granted by King Władysław I the Elbow-high, and later his son, Casimir III the Great, for supporting him during the Rebellion of wojt Albert in 1311–1312. During these times, the majority of the town's inhabitants were German colonists. In the 15th century it produced steel and woollen products, and nearly rivalled Kraków in visual arts. In 1329, Nowy Sącz signed a treaty with Kraków, upon which Kraków merchants, on their way to Hungary, had to stop at Nowy Sącz; Nowy Sącz merchants, on their way to Gdańsk, were obliged to stay at Kraków. In the mid-14th century, King Casimir the Great built a royal castle here and surrounded the town with a defensive wall. Nowy Sącz was the seat of a castellan and a starosta, becoming an important point in the system of defence of the southern border of Poland. The town was further elevated in 1448 when Bishop Zbigniew Oleśnicki promoted a local church to the status of a Collegiate. Nowy Sącz was a royal city of Poland, administratively located in the Kraków Voivodeship in the Lesser Poland Province.

Nowy Sącz prospered in the Polish Golden Age (16th century). It was an important centre of the Protestant Reformation. Local leader of the Polish Brethren, Stanisław Farnowski, was very popular among local nobility. Good times ended in the 17th century. In 1611 a great fire destroyed much of the town, and during the Swedish invasion of Poland, the town was captured by the Swedes (late 1655), who burned and looted it. Nowy Sącz was a centre of the rebellion against the invaders.

=== Partitions of Poland ===
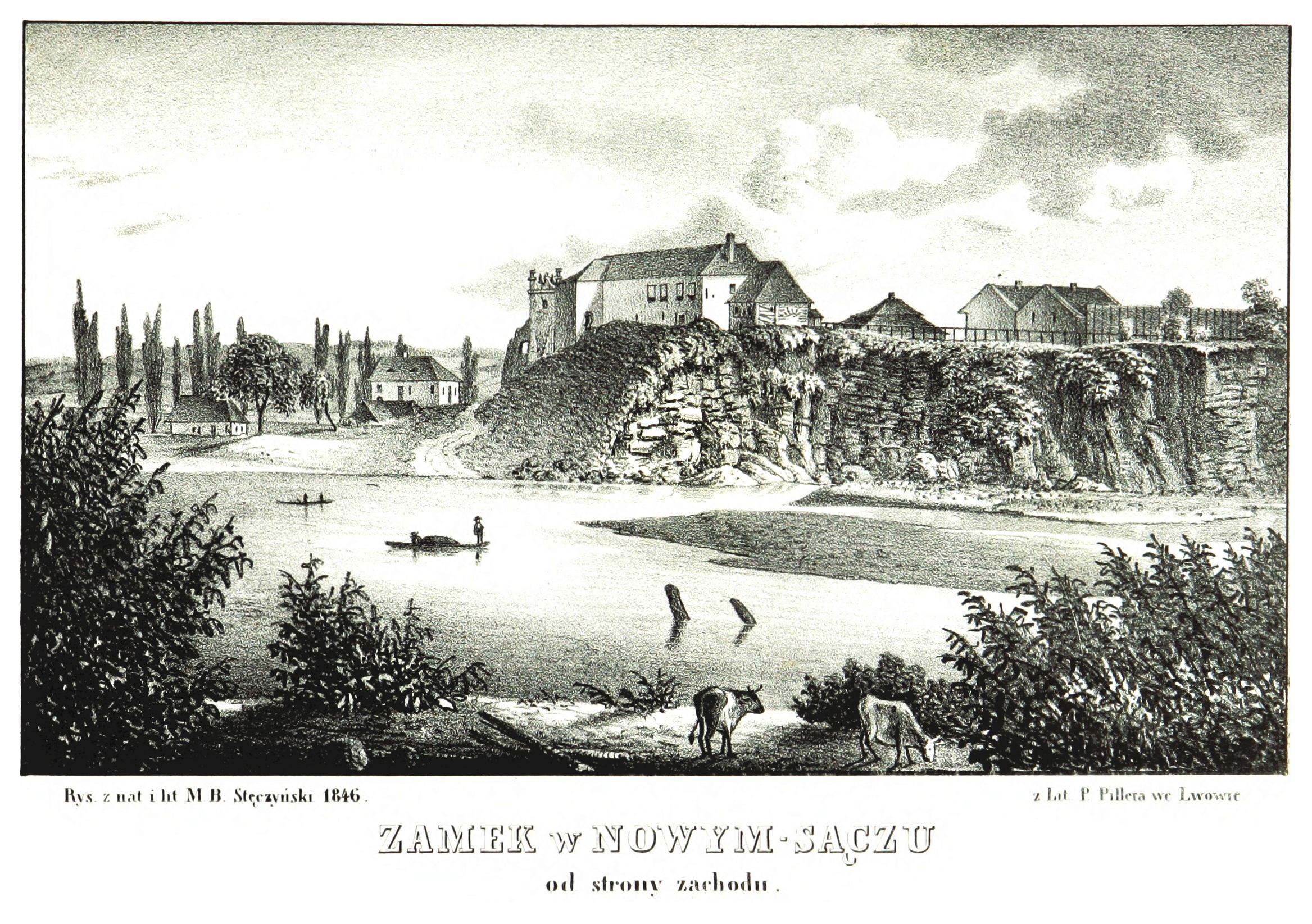
Nowy Sącz in the 1840s

The decline of the town continued in the 18th century, when Nowy Sącz suffered more destruction during the Great Northern War and the Bar Confederation, when the castle was burned. In 1772, during the First Partition of Poland, the town was annexed by the Habsburg Empire and made part of newly formed Galicia, where it remained until November 1918. Nowy Sącz rose to new prominence in the 19th century when the Austrian authorities built a railway connecting it with Vienna (1880s). Nowy Sącz was the seat of a county, new buildings were opened, the town was a rail hub with a large rail repair shop opened in 1876.

On 17 April 1894, the central part of Nowy Sącz burned in a fire, with a town hall and ancient town records. At that time, the town was important in Hasidic Jewish history for the founding of the Sanz Hasidic dynasty during the 19th century, the precursor to the Bobov dynasty founded in nearby Bobowa (with a synagogue with occasional services by Kraków congregation) and the Klausenberg dynasty.

=== World War I ===
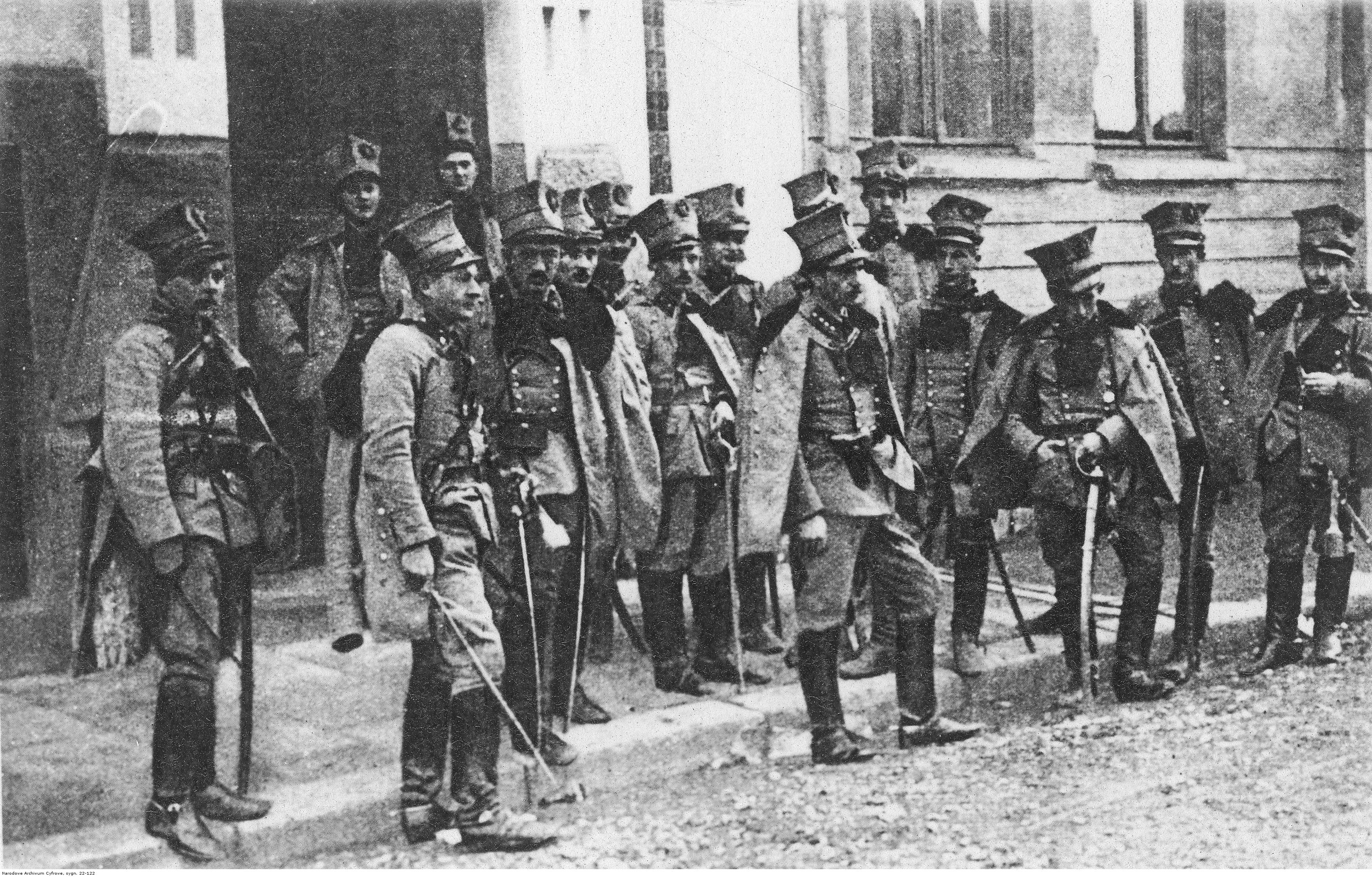
Uhlans of the 1st Brigade of the Polish Legions in Nowy Sącz in 1914

At the beginning of World War I, Nowy Sącz was occupied by the Russian Army. The Russians were driven back by the Central Powers in December 1914. In the final stages of the war, on 31 October – 1 November 1918, Poles stationed in the Austrian 10th Infantry Regiment in the city and local members of the secret Polish Military Organisation liberated it from Austrian rule, almost two weeks before Poland regained independence.

Nowy Sącz and its surroundings, including Nowy Targ and Sanok, were claimed by the Lemko Republic (1918–1920) with capital in Florynka. Within interwar Poland the city saw industrial expansion and the railway factory expanded. In 1936, the Museum of Sącz Land was opened in the restored royal castle. Nowy Sącz had a population of around 34,000 in 1939.

=== World War II ===
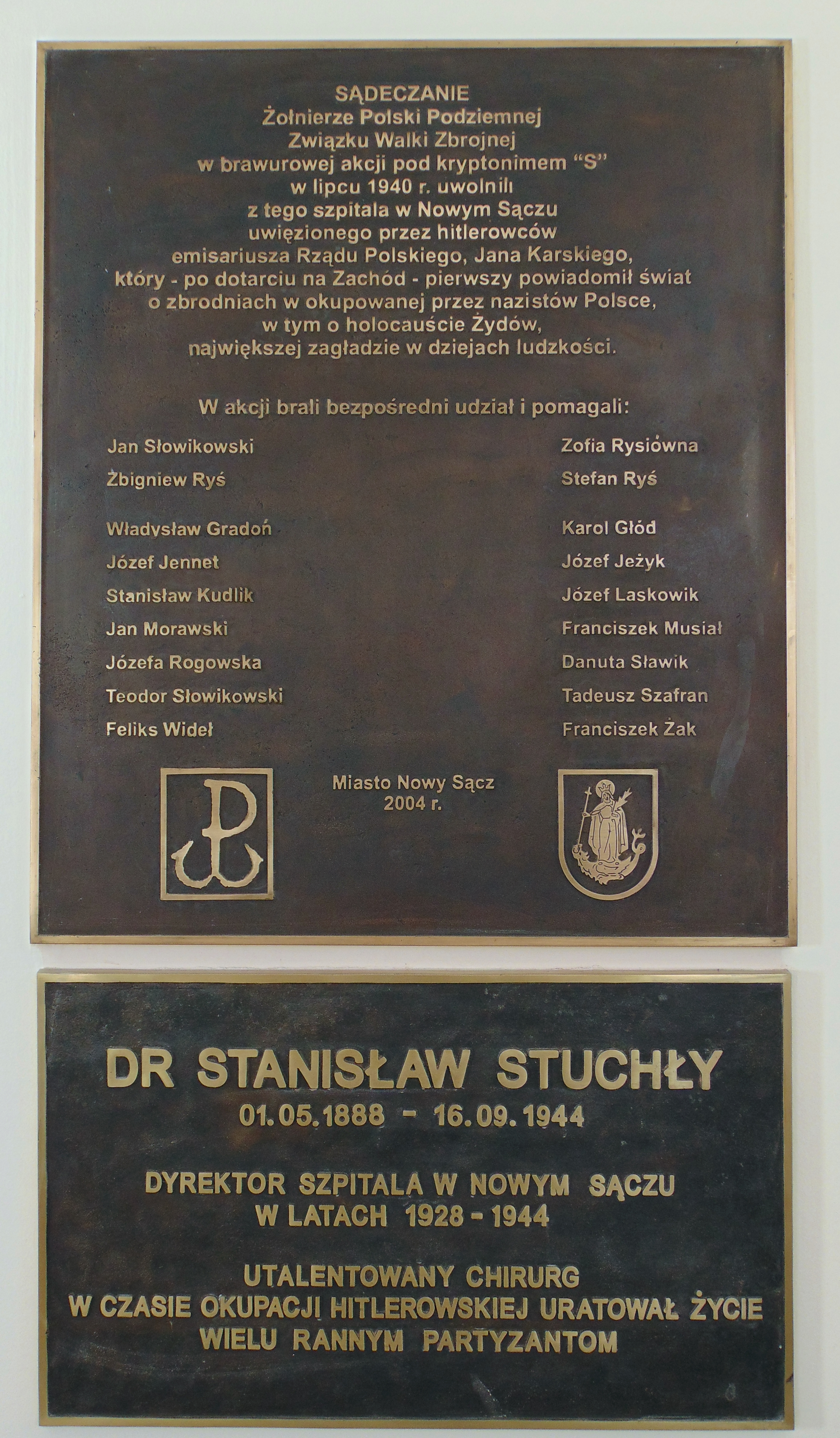
Memorial to the rescue of Jan Karski from German captivity in 1940

During the invasion of Poland starting World War II, Nazi Germany carried out air raids on 1–2 September 1939, and then German troops entered the city on 6 September. Afterwards, the German Einsatzgruppe I entered the city to commit various atrocities against the population, and then its members co-formed the local German police and security forces. Under German occupation the city was made part of the General Government. Poles expelled in December 1939 from several villages in the German-annexed Sieradz County were deported in freight trains to Nowy Sącz, while many locals were among Poles imprisoned in the infamous Montelupich Prison in Kraków and then murdered in the Krzesławice Fort of the Kraków Fortress, as part of the Intelligenzaktion. Because of its proximity to Slovakia, it lay on a major route for resistance fighters of the Polish Home Army. The Gestapo was active in capturing those trying to cross the border, including the murder of several Polish pilots. In June 1940, the resistance rescued Jan Karski from a hospital there, and a year later 32 people were shot in reprisal for the escape; several others were sent to concentration camps.

The regional Jewish community numbered about 25,000 before World War II, and nearly a third of the town's population was Jewish; ninety per cent of them died or did not return. The Nowy Sącz Ghetto for around 20,000 Jewish people was established by the German authorities near the castle. Its inhabitants were deported aboard Holocaust trains to Belzec extermination camp over three days in August 1942 and murdered.

The Jewish cemetery was the site of many executions of Jews and was also a preferred place for executing those accused of helping them, even in the smallest way. The first executions were carried out in the spring of 1940, although some sources mention as early as 1939. On 29 April 1942, the Germans murdered 300 residents of the ghetto here. In total, nearly 2,000 people of various nationalities were executed at this site. 300–500 Polish people were executed for their participation in the sheltering of Jews. Several Poles were also held by the occupiers in the local prison for helping Jews, before being deported to concentration camps.

The Red Army fought its way into the city on 20 January 1945. The city was restored to Poland, although with a Soviet-installed communist regime, which remained in power until the Fall of Communism in the 1980s. At war's end, about 60% of the city had been destroyed. Nowy Sącz was honoured for its heroism with the Cross of Grunwald, third class in 1946. In 1947 much of the Lemko population, living in villages southeast of the town, was deported in Action Vistula (mostly to land recently regained from Germany) in reaction to the nationalist Ukrainian activity in the region.

== Geography ==
Nowy Sącz is located at the confluence of the Kamienica River and Dunajec, about 20 kilometres (12 miles) north of the Slovak border, in the Sądecka Valley (Kotlina Sądecka) at an altitude of 381 metres (1,250 feet). It is surrounded by ranges of the eastern Outer Western Carpathian Mountains: Beskid Sądecki to the south, Beskid Wyspowy to the west, Beskid Niski to the southeast, and the foothills of Pogórze Rożnowskie to the north. The geological basis is Carpathian flysch – an undifferentiated grey-banded sandstone – with alluvial sediment from the Dunajec, Poprad, and Kamienica rivers in the valley basin.

Nowy Sącz is the governmental seat of Nowy Sącz County part of the Lesser Poland Voivodeship, Województwo Małopolskie since 1999. Between 1975 and 1998 it was the provincial seat of Nowy Sącz Voivodeship. Before that and during the Second Polish Republic, Nowy Sącz was a county seat in the Kraków Voivodeship. In 1951 it became a town with the rights of a county. It is the historic and tourist centre of Sądecczyzna, the Sądecki district.

=== Climate ===
Nowy Sącz has an oceanic climate (Köppen climate classification: Cfb) using the −3 °C (27 °F) isotherm or a humid continental climate (Köppen climate classification: Dfb) using the 0 °C (32 °F) isotherm. The climate is temperate, with an average annual rainfall of about 700 millimetres (27.6 inches). The range of temperatures is from -33,5 °C on 11 February 1956 to 36,8 °C on 8 August 2013. For example the lowest December temperature was recorded on 31 December 1978 it was -30,3 °C.

Climate data for Nowy Sącz (1991–2020 normals, extremes 1954–present)
Month	Jan	Feb	Mar	Apr	May	Jun	Jul	Aug	Sep	Oct	Nov	Dec	Year
Record high °C (°F)	15.8 (60.4)	20.3 (68.5)	25.6 (78.1)	30.0 (86.0)	32.7 (90.9)	34.4 (93.9)	36.7 (98.1)	36.8 (98.2)	36.0 (96.8)	28.2 (82.8)	22.4 (72.3)	19.4 (66.9)	36.8 (98.2)
Mean maximum °C (°F)	10.2 (50.4)	13.0 (55.4)	18.4 (65.1)	24.2 (75.6)	28.4 (83.1)	31.2 (88.2)	32.8 (91.0)	32.5 (90.5)	27.8 (82.0)	23.6 (74.5)	17.6 (63.7)	11.2 (52.2)	33.7 (92.7)
Mean daily maximum °C (°F)	2.3 (36.1)	4.3 (39.7)	9.0 (48.2)	15.4 (59.7)	20.2 (68.4)	23.5 (74.3)	25.4 (77.7)	25.4 (77.7)	19.9 (67.8)	14.8 (58.6)	8.7 (47.7)	3.3 (37.9)	14.4 (57.9)
Daily mean °C (°F)	−1.5 (29.3)	0.0 (32.0)	3.7 (38.7)	9.2 (48.6)	13.8 (56.8)	17.3 (63.1)	19.0 (66.2)	18.6 (65.5)	13.9 (57.0)	9.2 (48.6)	4.5 (40.1)	−0.2 (31.6)	9.0 (48.2)
Mean daily minimum °C (°F)	−4.9 (23.2)	−3.7 (25.3)	−0.6 (30.9)	3.6 (38.5)	8.1 (46.6)	11.8 (53.2)	13.4 (56.1)	13.0 (55.4)	9.0 (48.2)	5.0 (41.0)	1.1 (34.0)	−3.3 (26.1)	4.4 (39.9)
Mean minimum °C (°F)	−17.3 (0.9)	−14.6 (5.7)	−8.8 (16.2)	−3.1 (26.4)	1.0 (33.8)	6.3 (43.3)	7.7 (45.9)	7.2 (45.0)	2.5 (36.5)	−3.1 (26.4)	−7.8 (18.0)	−14.1 (6.6)	−20.1 (−4.2)
Record low °C (°F)	−29.2 (−20.6)	−33.5 (−28.3)	−29.4 (−20.9)	−10.5 (13.1)	−3.1 (26.4)	−0.5 (31.1)	3.0 (37.4)	2.9 (37.2)	−3.7 (25.3)	−8.3 (17.1)	−18.5 (−1.3)	−30.3 (−22.5)	−33.5 (−28.3)
Average precipitation mm (inches)	31.5 (1.24)	31.3 (1.23)	36.9 (1.45)	50.0 (1.97)	95.3 (3.75)	105.0 (4.13)	110.7 (4.36)	83.5 (3.29)	66.0 (2.60)	51.6 (2.03)	35.7 (1.41)	30.1 (1.19)	727.6 (28.65)
Average extreme snow depth cm (inches)	10.4 (4.1)	11.0 (4.3)	6.1 (2.4)	1.9 (0.7)	0.0 (0.0)	0.0 (0.0)	0.0 (0.0)	0.0 (0.0)	0.0 (0.0)	0.6 (0.2)	4.4 (1.7)	6.1 (2.4)	11.0 (4.3)
Average precipitation days (≥ 0.1 mm)	15.77	14.55	14.03	13.47	15.80	15.70	16.00	13.00	12.83	13.40	13.20	14.60	172.35
Average snowy days (≥ 0 cm)	19.6	17.7	7.9	1.3	0.0	0.0	0.0	0.0	0.0	0.3	5.3	14.1	66.2
Average relative humidity (%)	81.7	78.8	73.7	70.3	73.6	74.6	75.1	76.3	80.1	81.2	82.3	82.9	77.6
Mean monthly sunshine hours	64.1	76.7	122.8	169.4	207.6	207.6	223.9	224.1	150.8	118.2	74.0	58.0	1,697
Source 1: Institute of Meteorology and Water Management
Source 2: Meteomodel.pl (records, relative humidity 1991–2020)

== Economy ==
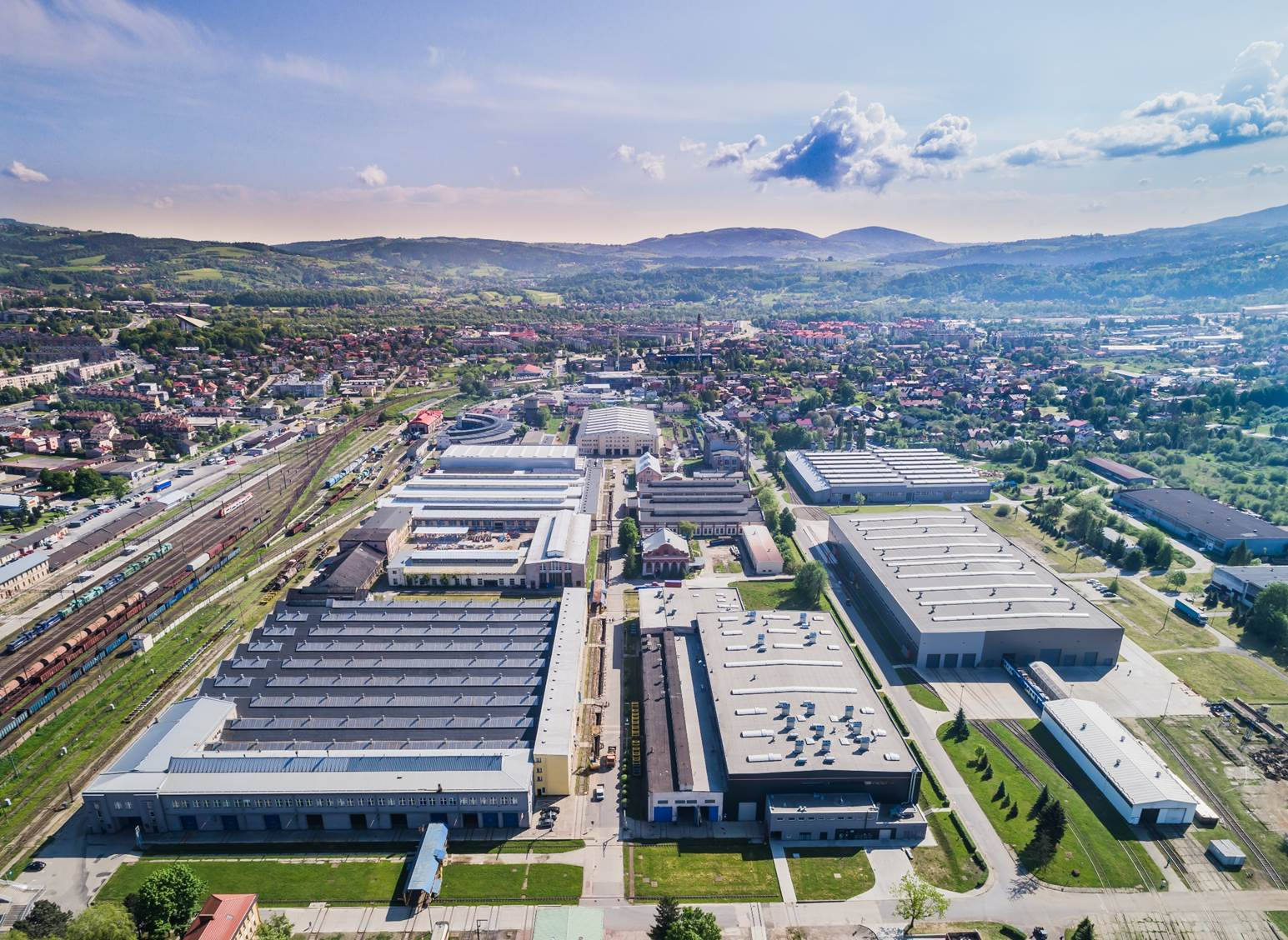
Newag factory

During the Polish communist regime, Nowy Sącz was the capital of Nowy Sącz Voivodeship (1975–98). In the 1950s the Polish authorities applied a special economic programme for the town, called the Nowy Sacz Experiment. The plan was to provide improvement and acceleration of the region's economic development, but it was only partially completed. The town was an important centre of the railway industry, and now contains one of the biggest railway engineering works in Poland. After the fall of communism in 1989, the industry faced economic problems, but overcame them eventually. Newag is now exporting trains to other European countries.

Nowy Sącz is also important in the food industry, specialising in processing fruits, especially apples. Most of the factories were in the Biegonice district. Now the local government is trying to change the structure of the industry, restructuring old factories and encouraging new companies to start up. This initiative also includes a move to the hi-tech industry. Nowy Sącz had one of the first computer companies in Poland, with the largest assembly plant in Europe, but this has closed due to ownership friction with the government. The building trade is also represented in the town, which has a major European window-manufacturer, Fakro. Like all the bigger towns in Lesser Poland, it has seen a significant influx of the largest European grocery chains.

== Architecture ==
The city has many historic features, including one of the largest marketplaces in Europe after Kraków, along with one of the largest old squares in Poland

- Ratusz (city hall) centred in the Market Square, built in the late 19th century
- The partially restored ruins of a mediæval Royal Castle from the 14th century during the reign of Kazimierz the Great. It was destroyed in 1945 at the end of World War II when it was used as a German ammunition store and was the site of mass executions. There are also the remains of the city walls nearby.
- Saint Margaret's Basilica (Bazylika kolegiacka Św. Małgorzaty), a Gothic church from the 14th century. The coat of arms shows St. Margaret and a dragon; her name day is 20 July.
- A 15th-century Gothic House (Dom Gotycki) containing a regional museum.
- Holy Spirit Church - Jesuit, former Premonstratensian Gothic (choir) and Baroque (nave)
- Former Franciscan church - initially built in the 13th century and demolished after the suppression of the order by Joseph II. Until now only the Chapel of the Transfiguration (1654-1672) survived and serves as a Lutheran church
- The Great Synagogue, dating from 1746. There is a memorial tablet on the front in Polish, Hebrew, and Yiddish. Across the Kamienica River is the Jewish cemetery.
- St. Lawrence Church - Gothic Revial, built 1906-1909 according to the project by Jan Sas Zubrzycki
- St. Casimir Church - Gothic Revial, built 1908-1912 according to the project by Teodor Talowski
- Kolonia Kolejowa - company town from the late 19th century, built for the railway workers. Notable structires are the workers' club (Dom robotniczy) and the Sacred Heart Church (1897-1899, designed by Teodor Talowski)
- Nowy Sącz railway station - opened in 1876, rebuilt in Art Nouveau style in 1909
- Saint Roch, a church of wooden construction from the 15th century, in the Dąbrówka district. The old cemetery chapel St. Helen's Church is another example.
- An open-air museum or skansen (Sądecki Park Etnograficzny), containing a village of relocated authentic structures recreating indigenous architecture, customs, and folk culture from the region. Of particular note are the wooden churches, including an Orthodox church and the Roma (Gypsy) village.
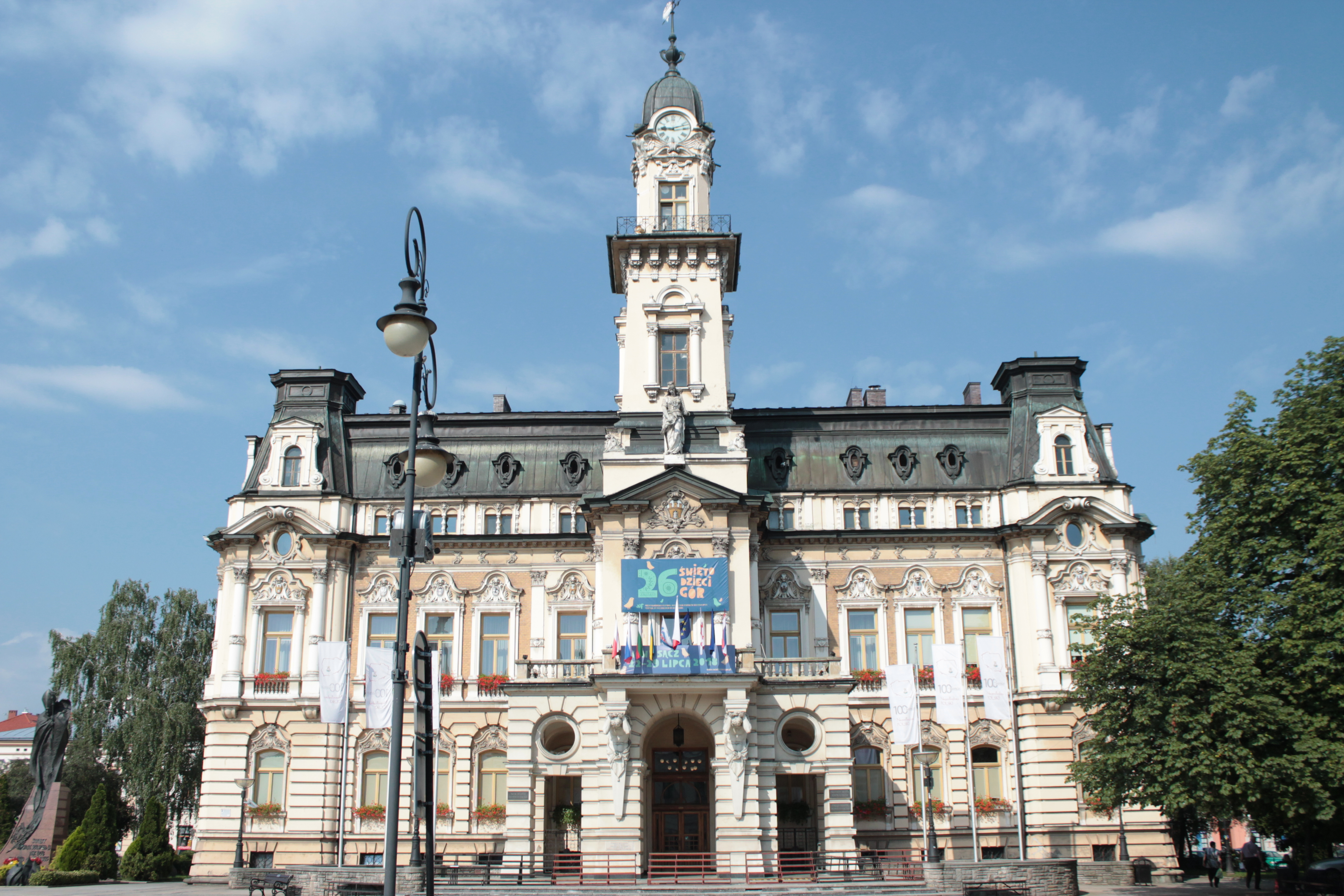
Nowy Sącz Market Square with the city hall

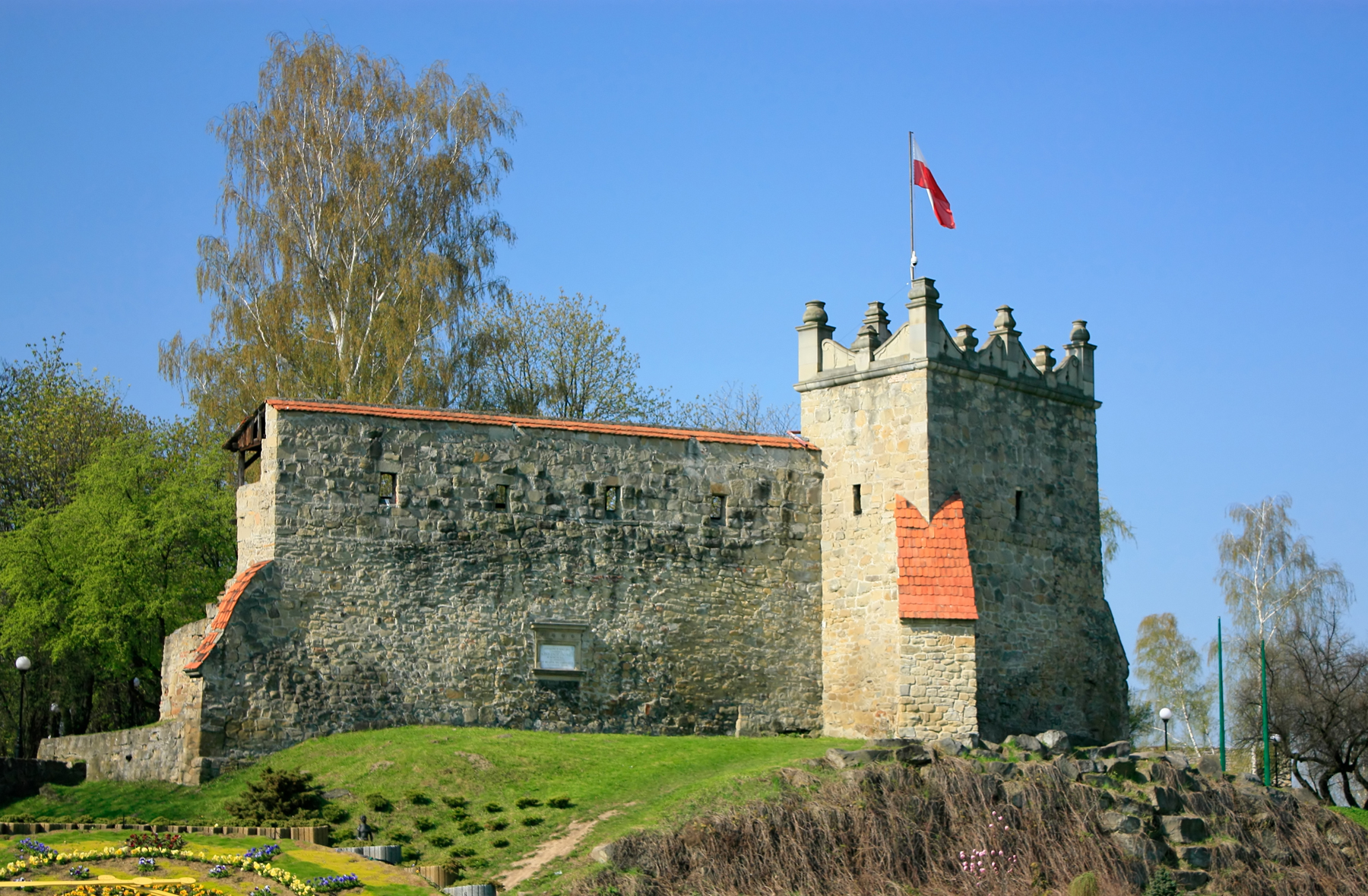
Royal Castle

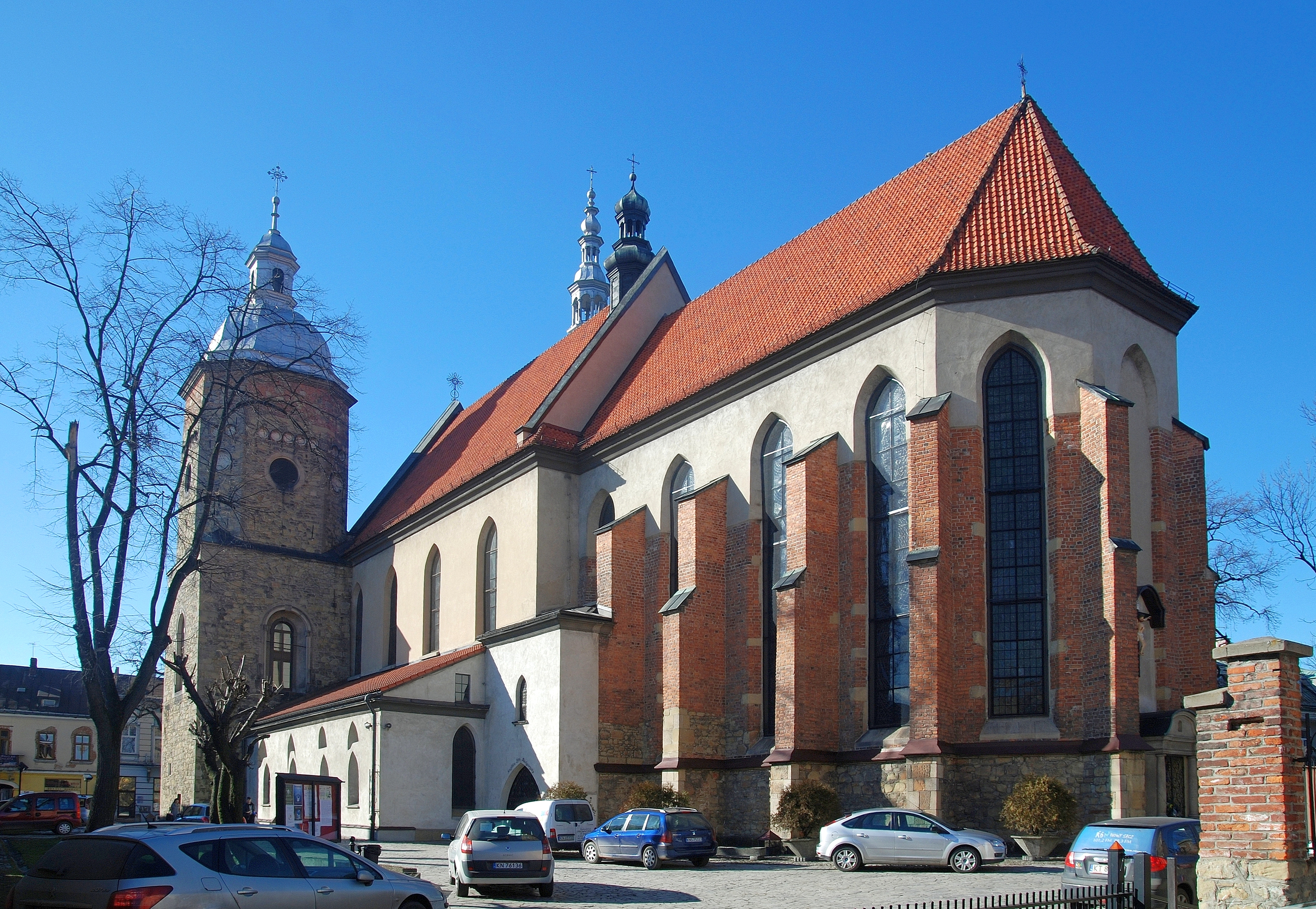
Saint Margaret's Basilica

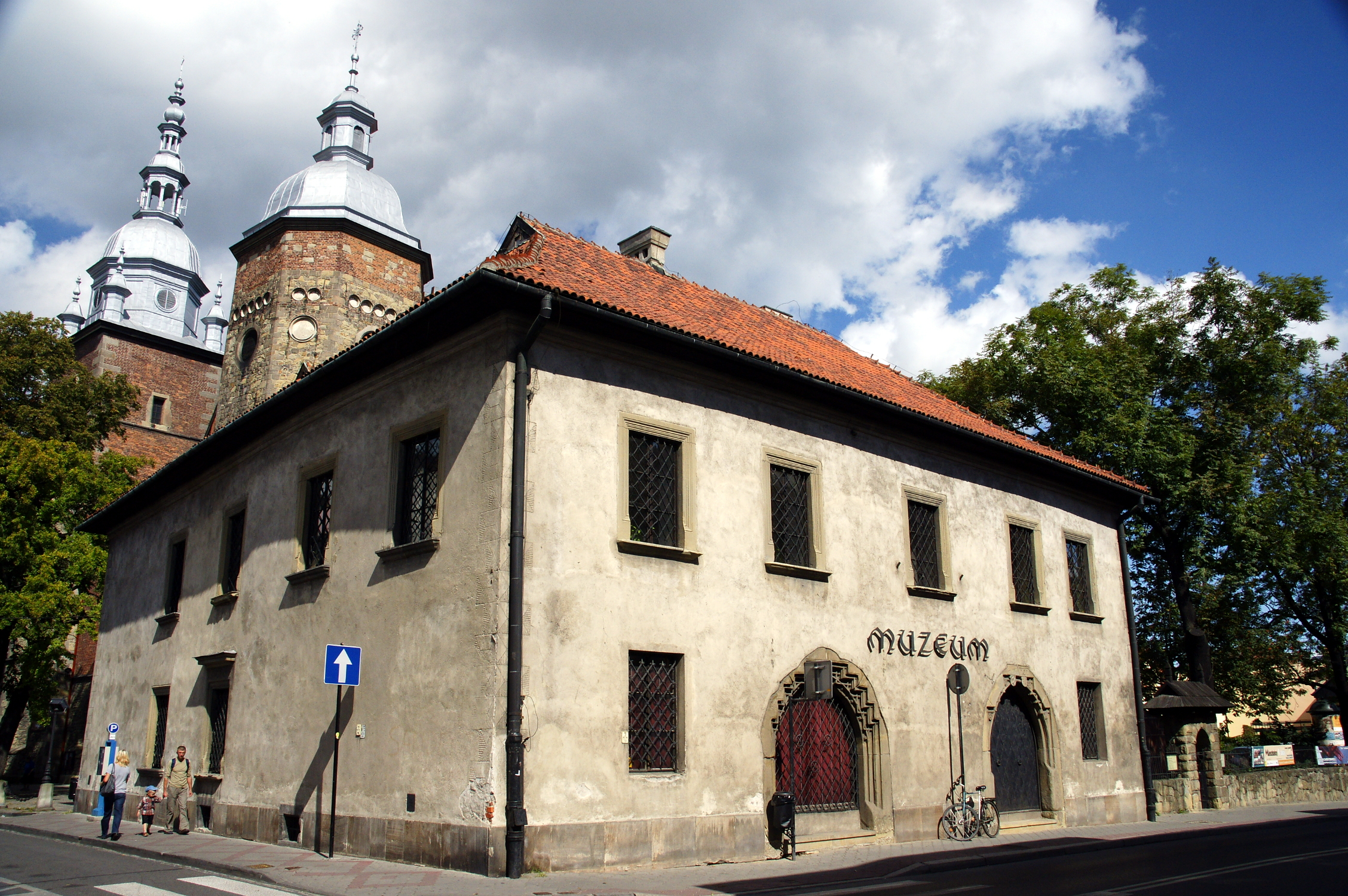
Gothic House, a regional museum

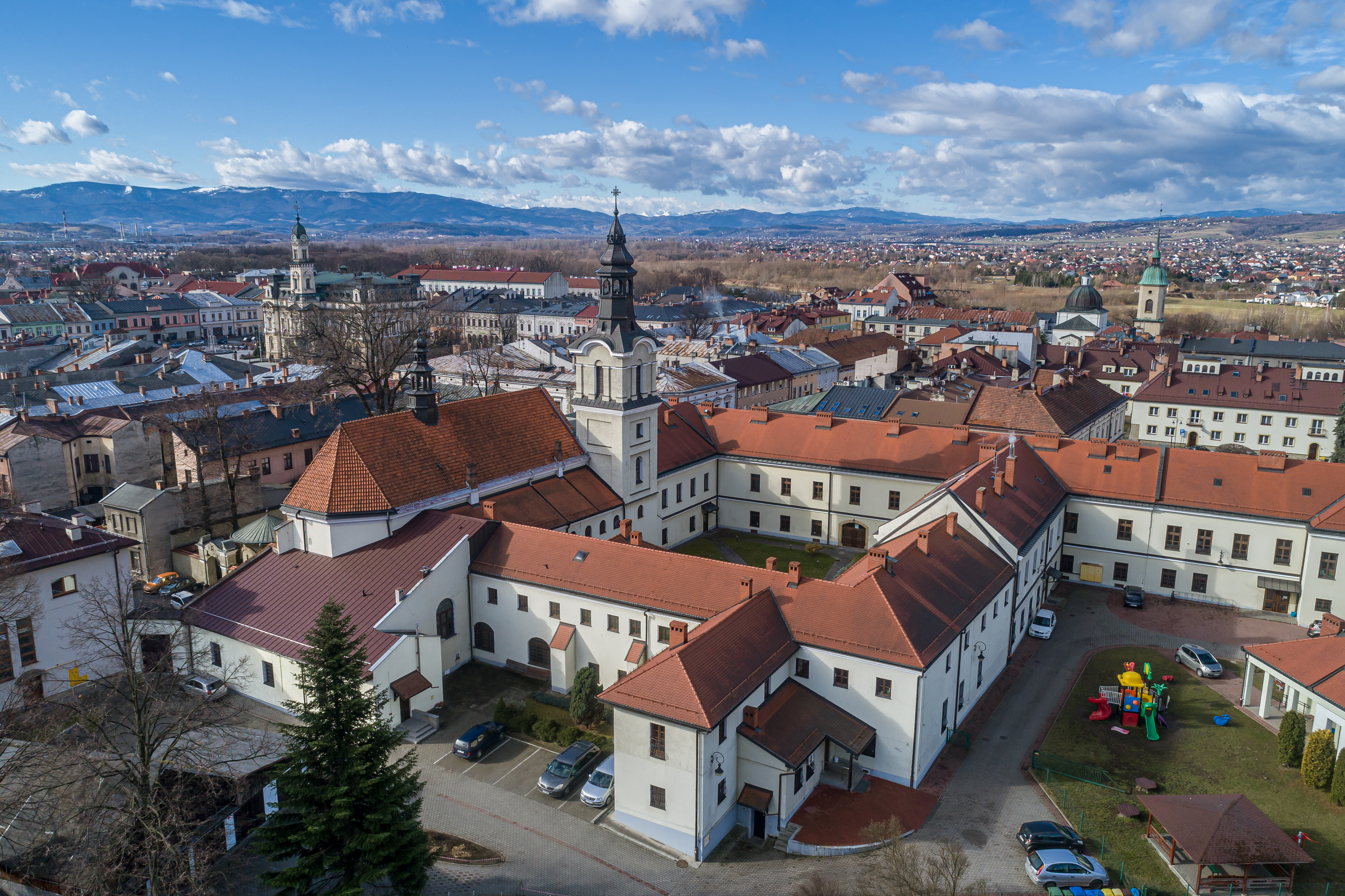
Holy Spirit Church

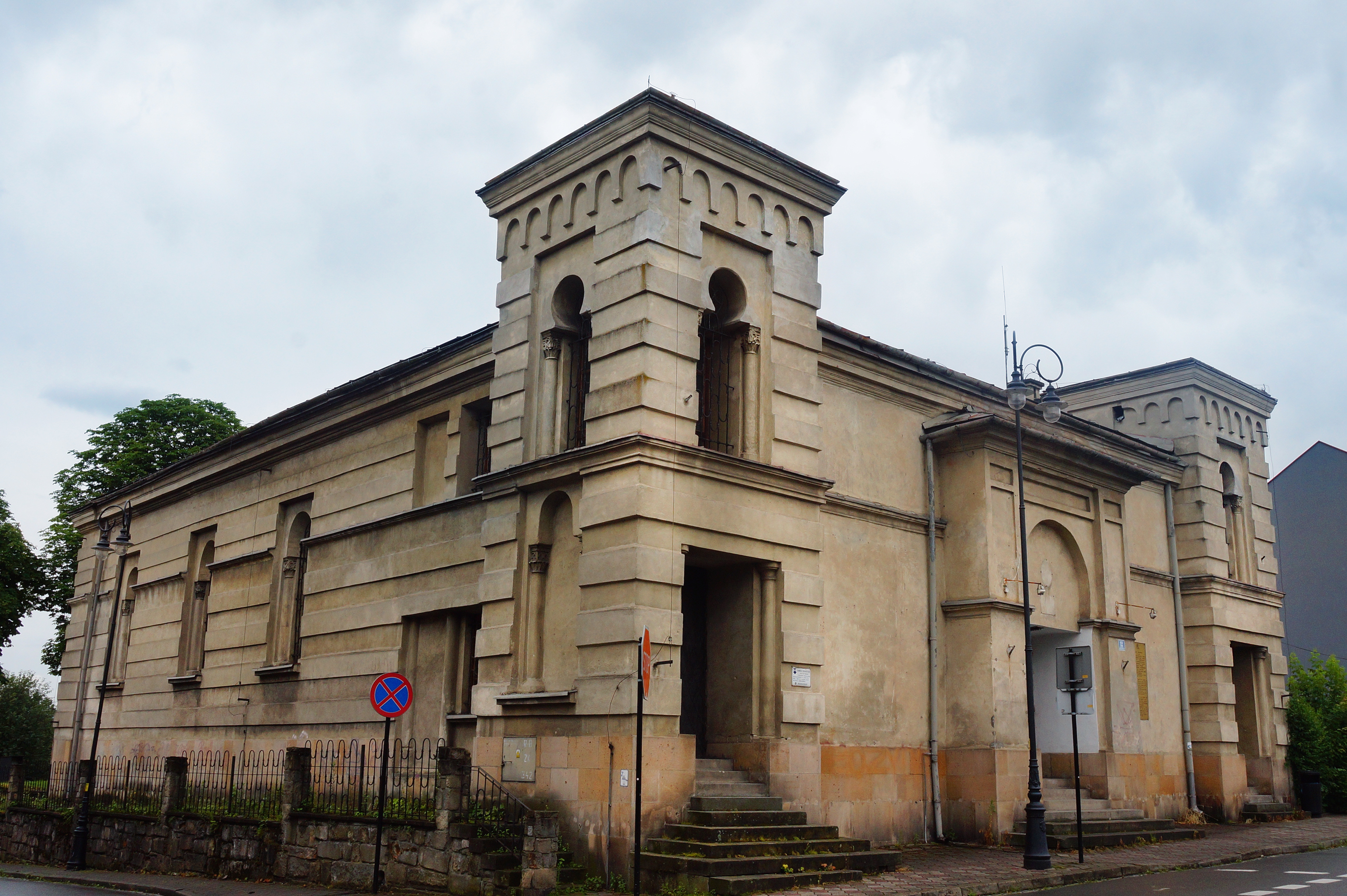
Great Synagogue

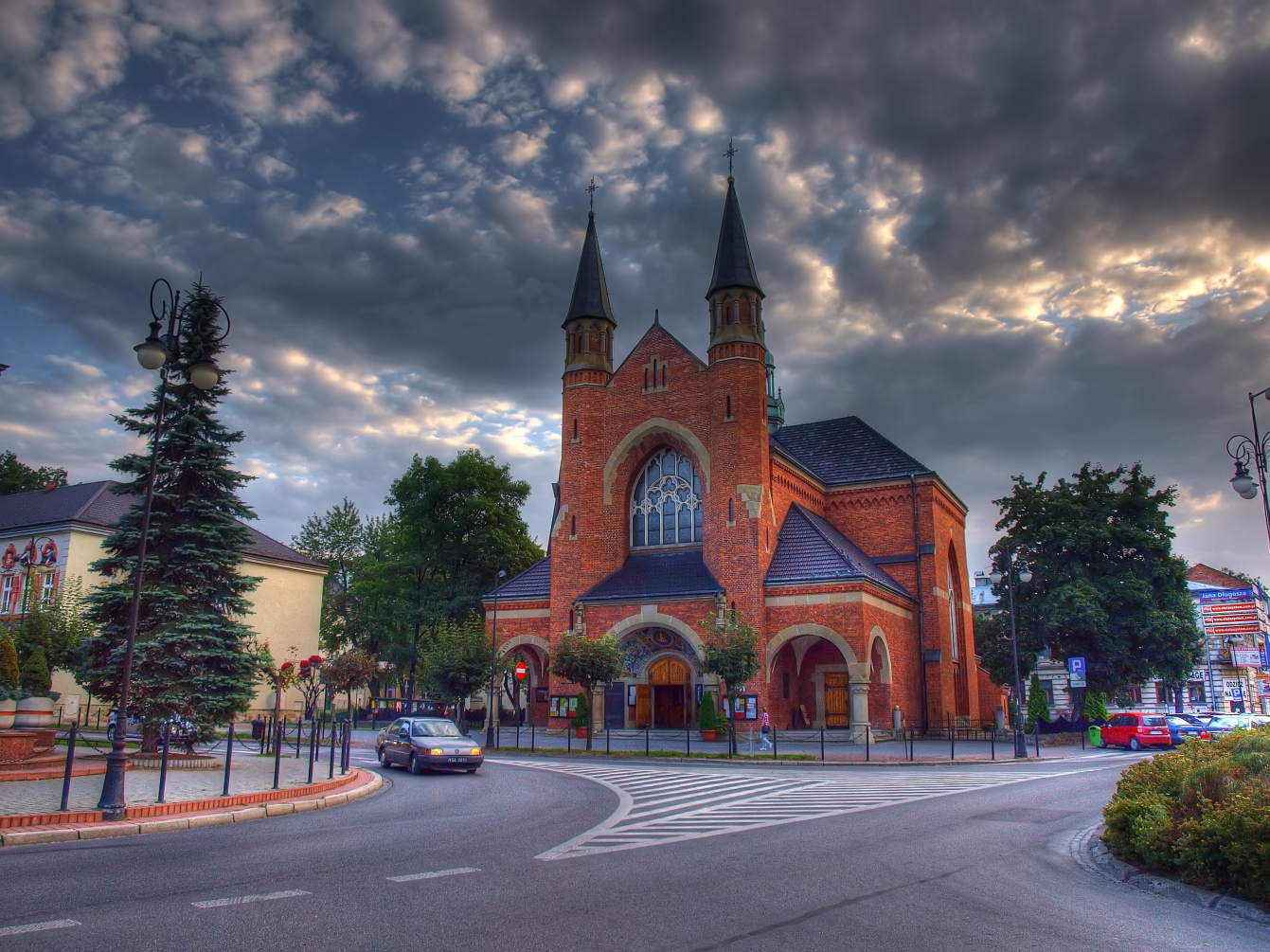
St. Casimir Church

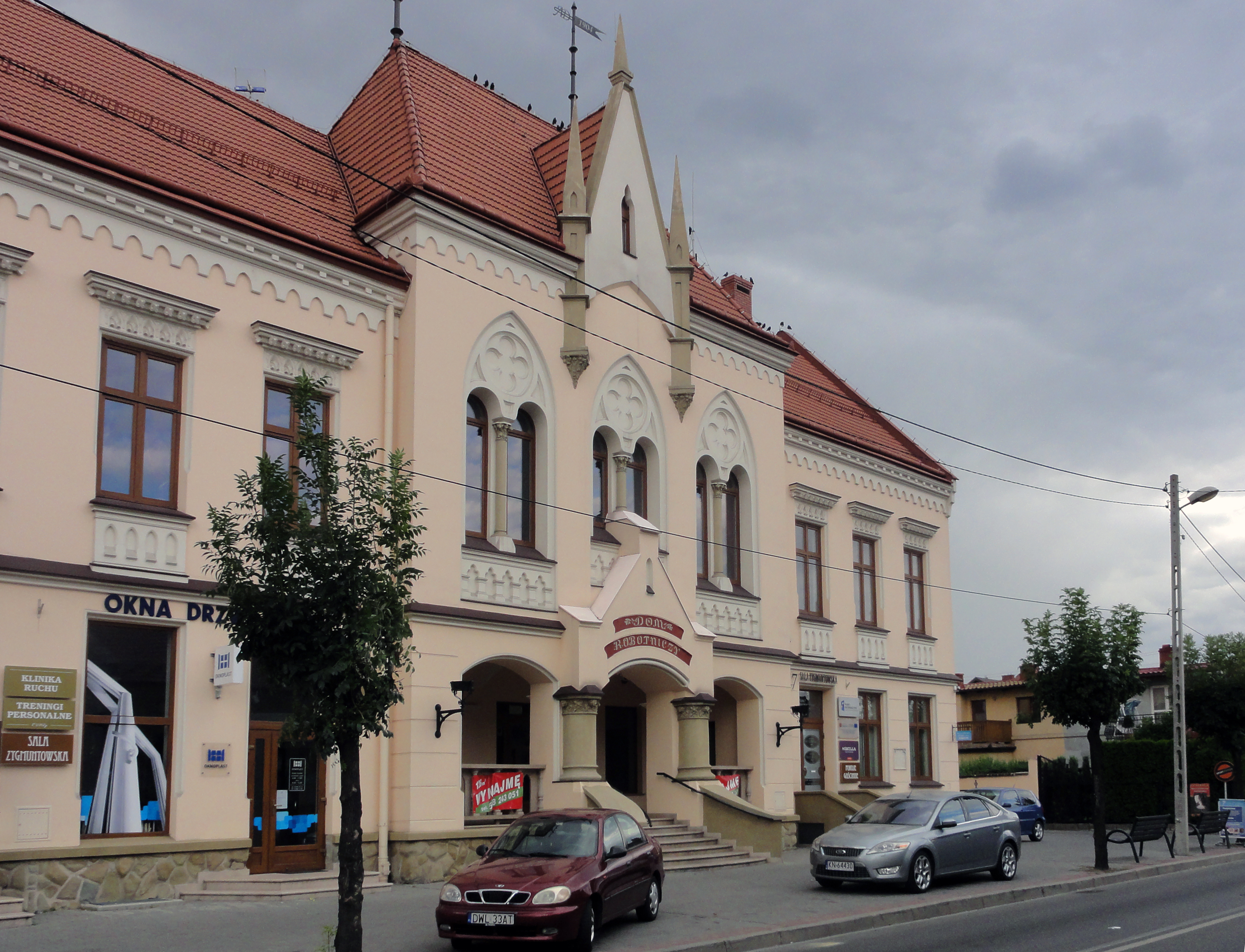
Dom robotniczy in Kolonia Kolejowa estate

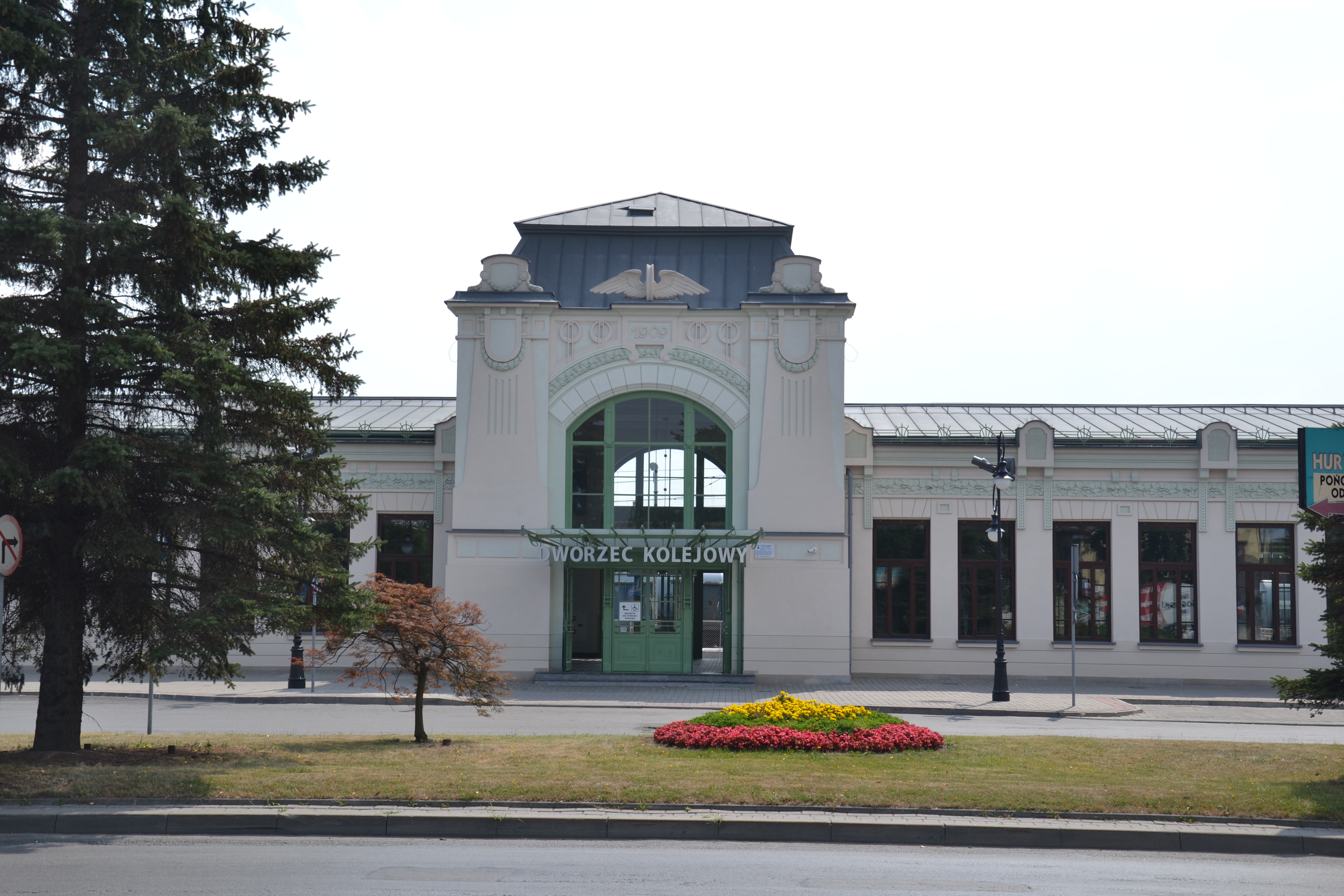
Nowy Sącz railway station

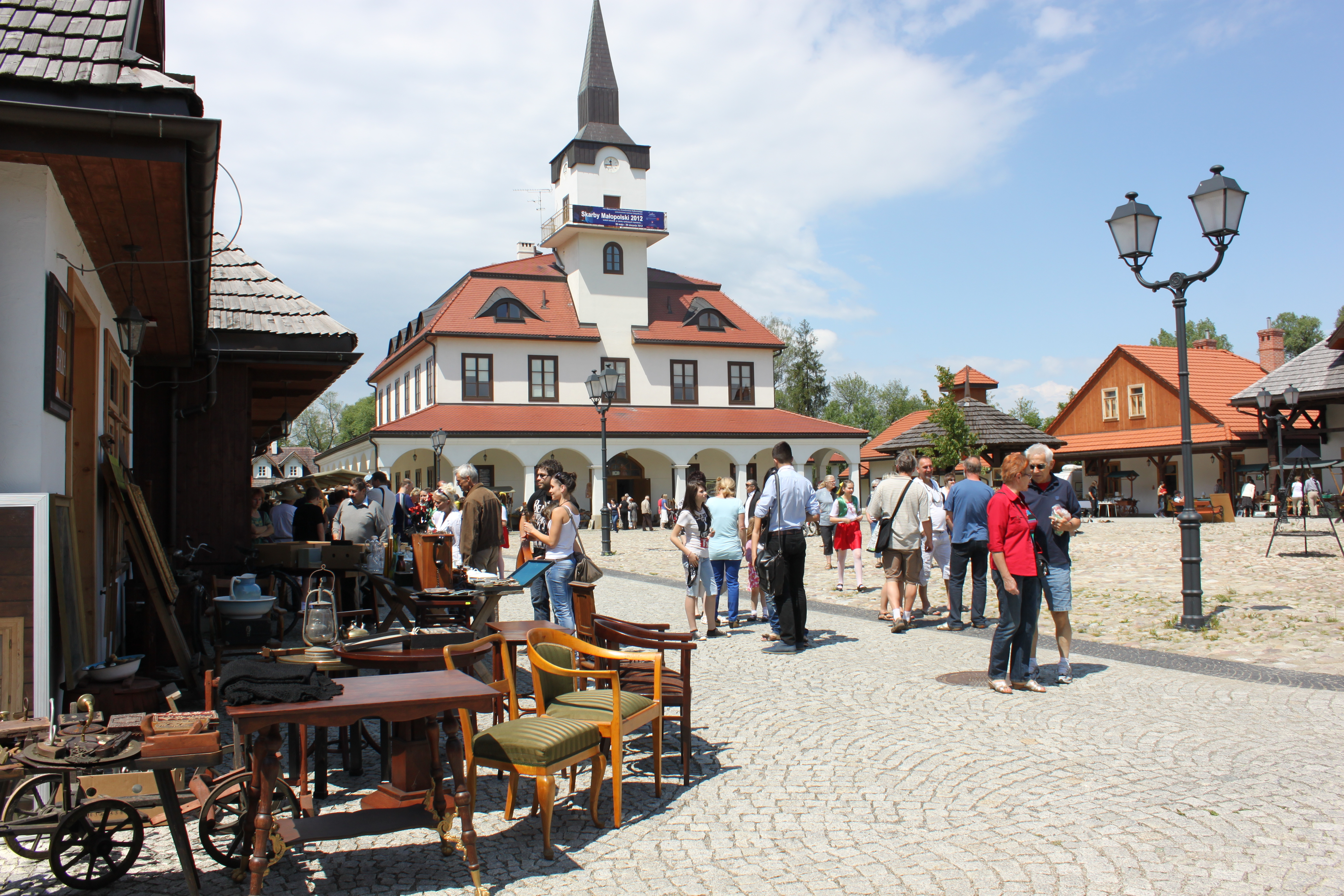
Open-air museum Sądecki Park Etnograficzny

== Tourism ==
The mountainous country around Nowy Sącz is also popular with tourists, hikers and skiers, especially the Beskid Sądecki mountains (part of the Carpathians), of which the highest peak is Radziejowa (1,262 m (4,140.42 ft) above sea level). Nearby popular mountain resorts include Krynica-Zdrój and Piwniczna-Zdrój ("Zdrój" means "health spa"). 15 km (9 mi) north of Nowy Sącz is Lake Rożnów (Jezioro Rożnowskie), a reservoir (22 km (14 mi) long, covering an area of 16 km^{2} (6 sq mi), and having a capacity of 193,000,000 m^{3}), with many dachas and camping sites. To the north of the lake is the Ciężkowice-Rożnów Landscape Park (Park Ciężkowicko-Rożnowski). An annual festival of dance featuring children from highland regions from around the world takes place in July.

== Sports ==
- Sandecja Nowy Sacz – a football team, currently in the Polish Second Division
- KS Dunajec/Start Nowy Sacz – a football team, playing in the local league
- MKS Beskid Nowy Sącz – a handball team, playing in the Polish First Division
- Olimpia Nowy Sacz – a handball team, playing in the Polish First Division
- UKS Dwójka Nowy Sacz – a handball team, playing in the Polish Second Division
- RC Czarno Biali – a rugby team, playing in the Polish Second Division
- SKS Start Nowy Sącz – a whitewater kayaking club
- NS Backyard Wrestling – a local wrestling federation

== Education ==
- Wyższa Szkoła Biznesu - National-Louis University — a business college with a strong emphasis on English. It has American accreditation.
- Akademia Nauk Stosowanych (Academy of Applied Sciences)
- Wyższa Szkoła Przedsiębiorczości
- ZSEM "Elektryk" Technikum nr 7, Technical Secondary School of Electronics and Mechatronics. Best school of that type in the whole of Poland in 2014 by Educational Foundation "Perspektywy" ratings.

== Notable people ==
- Arthur Berson (1859–1942), German meteorologist
- Bolesław Barbacki (1891–1941), Polish painter, actor, director
- Pinchas Burstein (1927–1977), later known as Maryan S. Maryan, Jewish-American artist and Holocaust survivor
- Chaim Halberstam (1793–1876), Hasidic rebbe
- Carl Menger (1840–1921), Founder of Austrian School of Economics
- Władysław Hasior (1928–1999), Polish artist and sculptor
- Dawid Janczyk (born 1987), Polish international football player
- Majka Jeżowska (born 1960), Polish singer
- Joanna Kanska (born 1959), Polish-British actress
- Władysław Kiełbasa (1893–1939), lieutenant colonel in the Polish Army
- Janusz Kowalik (born 1944), Polish footballer for KS Cracovia and first ever MVP of the NASL in 1968
- Adam Kossowski (1905–1986), Polish artist
- Władysław Lizoń (born 1954), Canadian Member of Parliament, Former National president of the Canadian Polish Congress
- Aleksander Michał Lubomirski (?–1675), Starost of Nowy Sącz
- Jerzy Aleksander Lubomirski (?–1735), Starost of Nowy Sącz
- Stanisław Lubomirski (?–1585), Starost
- Raphael Mahler (1899–1977), historian
- Mariusz Mężyk (born 1983), footballer
- Józef Oleksy (1946–2015), Polish Prime Minister
- Efraim Racker (1913–1991), biochemist
- Zygmunt Tarło (c. 1561 or c. 1562–1628), Kasztelan of Nowy Sącz
- Piotr Świerczewski (1972), Polish international football player
- Robert Ruchała (1998), Polish mixed martial artist
- Klaudia Zwolińska (born 1998), slalom canoeist

== Twin towns – sister cities ==
Nowy Sącz is twinned with:

- Columbia County, Georgia, United States
- Elbląg, Poland
- Gabrovo, Bulgaria
- Kiskunhalas, Hungary
- Narvik, Norway
- Netanya, Israel
- Prešov, Slovakia
- Stará Ľubovňa, Slovakia
- Stryi, Ukraine
- Suzhou, China
- Tarnów, Poland
- Trakai, Lithuania
- La Baule-Escoublac, France
- (England) The Wirral, United Kingdom
- Tinley Park, United States

== See also ==
- Bacza
- Multimedia City
