= Coat of arms of Nowy Sącz =

Coat of arms of Nowy Sącz

The coat of arms of Nowy Sącz in Poland shows Saint Margaret the Virgin, depicting the legend that she was swallowed by Satan, in the form of a dragon, who was however forced to spit her out again because the cross she was carrying irritated the dragon's innards. In Margaret's other hand is an olive branch, a symbol of peace.

Coat of arms of Nowy Sącz 1987 - 2017

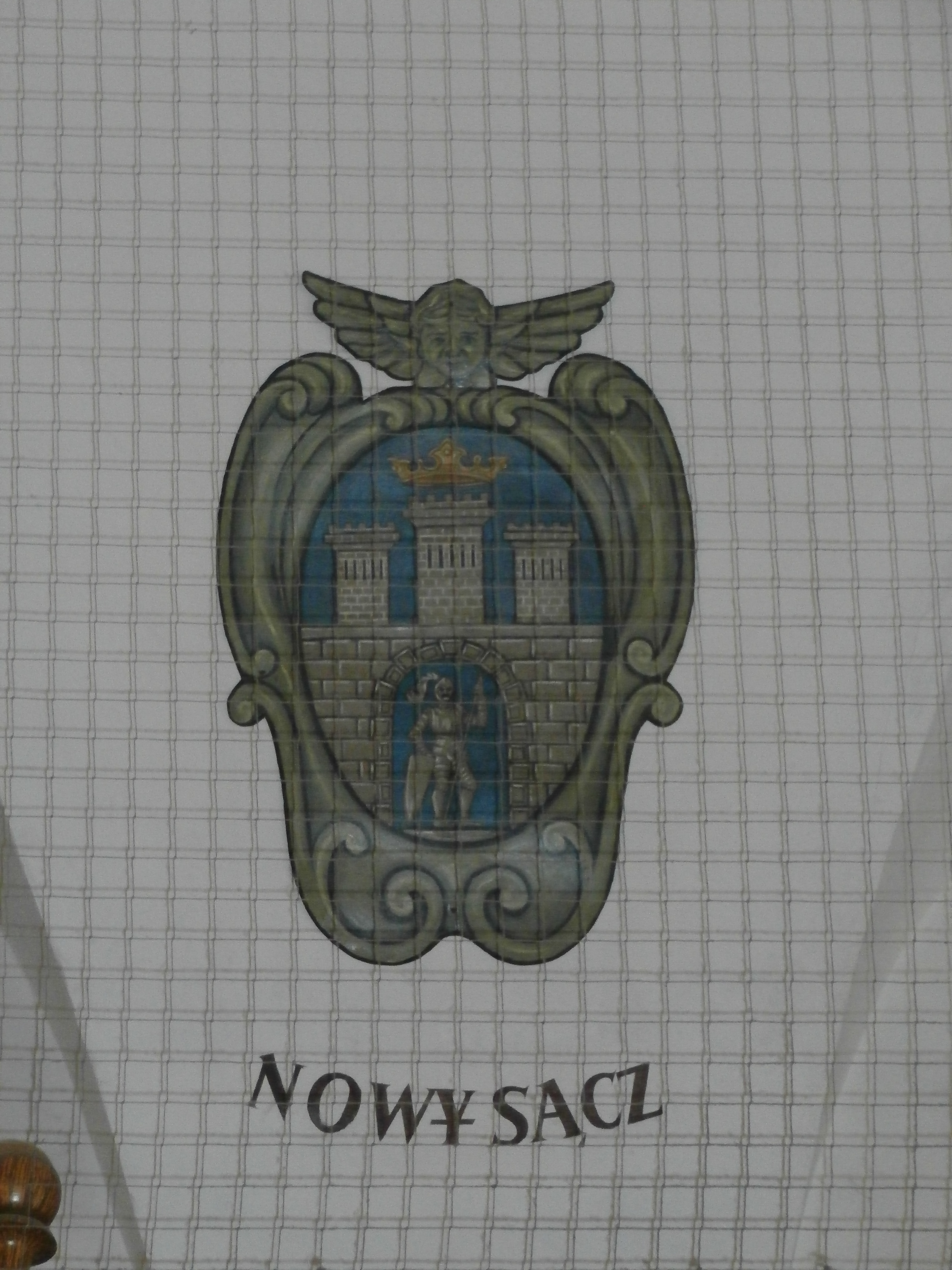
Coat of arms of Nowy Sącz 1820 - 1987, in the Kraków Cloth Hall

The arms were officially adopted on 21 March 1938 but the device of Saint Margaret standing on the dragon was in use from the foundation of the city in 1292, as appears from the city seals.
