= Władysław Kiełbasa =

Polish army officer (1893–1939)

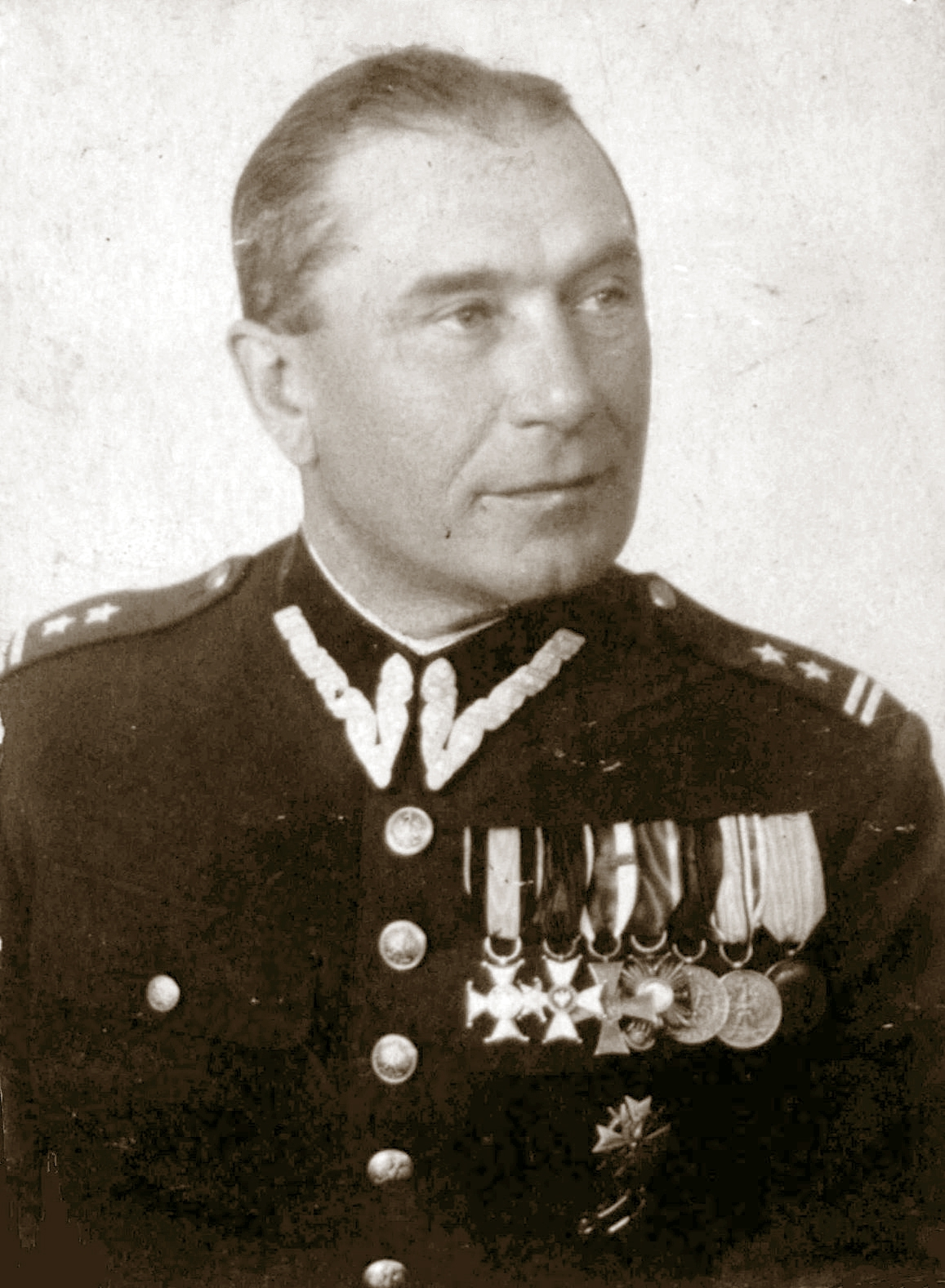
Władysław Kiełbasa

Władysław Kiełbasa (born December 31, 1893, in Nowy Sącz – September 2, 1939, in Mikołów) was a Lieutenant Colonel (Podpułkownik) of the Polish Army.

He fought in the Polish-Soviet War, where he was seriously wounded, and later in World War II.

On the first day of World War II, German troops invaded Upper Silesia from the directions of Gliwice. Władysław Kiełbasa was part of the "Silesia" operational group, which was in turn part of the Kraków Army. While leading a counterattack against German forces between the towns of Mikołów and Wyry, part of an operation to withdraw Polish units behind the Przemsza River, Kiełbasa was struck by shrapnel and killed.

He was awarded several medals including the Virtuti Militari (Class V and IV), Krzyż Niepodległości (Cross of Independence), Krzyż Kawalerski (Cavalier's Cross), Krzyż Walecznych (Cross of Valor) twice, and the Cross of Merit (Gold) twice.
