= Wyższa Szkoła Biznesu – National-Louis University =

Private university in Nowy Sącz, Poland

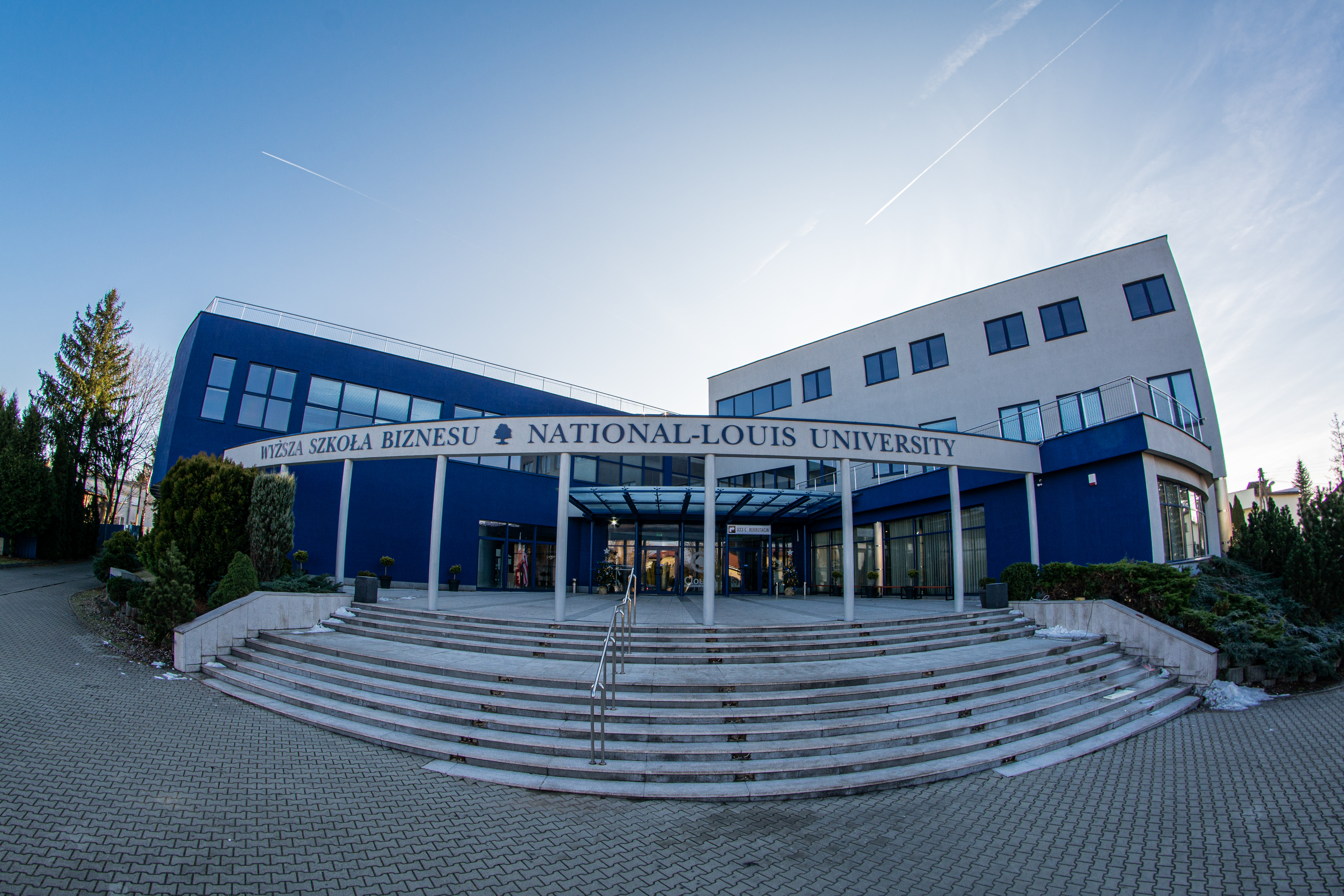
- The main building of the University
- Other names: WSB-NLU
- Type: Non-public university
- Established: 1 October 1991
- Rector: prof. WSB-NLU Dariusz Woźniak, Ph.D.
- Students: 7,360 (12.2023)
- Location: Nowy Sącz, Poland; 49°36′03″N 20°41′26″E
- Website: www.wsb-nlu.edu.pl

Wyższa Szkoła Biznesu – National-Louis University (WSB-NLU) — non-public university, one of the first non-public higher education schools in Poland. The university offers bachelor's, engineer's and master's degree in the following fields: computer science, management, psychology, law and postgraduate studies including MBA program.WSB-NLU was the first university in Poland to offer an American diploma of Bachelor of Arts in addition to the Polish diploma and the first to offer its students a virtual dean's office and an electronic student record book. Currently, the university operates on the basis of the Cloud Academy™ management system, awarded during the 11th edition of the Highest Quality QI 2017 competition as the largest pro-quality program in Poland.The competition is organized under the patronage of the Department of Quality Management at the Cracow University of Economics, the Polish Committee for Standardization and the Polish Agency for Enterprise Development. The university has a good rating awarded by the Polish Accreditation Committee.

The strategic partner is the American National Louis University, based in Chicago. The university was established in 1991, and in May 1992, a key agreement was signed with National Louis University in Chicago, which resulted in the official name change to WSB-NLU. Thanks to this cooperation, the university was able to offer curricula based on American business and quality standards from the very beginning. For many years, students had the opportunity to obtain two degrees: a Polish one (Bachelor's/Master's) and an American one (Bachelor of Arts) issued specifically by the Chicago-based National Louis University.

== Authorities ==
WSB-NLU authorities (2023):

- President: Krzysztof Pawłowski, Ph.D.
- Rector: prof. WSB-NLU Dariusz Woźniak, Ph.D.
- Vicerector: prof. WSB-NLU Michał Jasieński, Ph.D.
- Dean: Jerzy Choroszczak, Ph.D.
- Vicedean: Krzysztof Przybycień, Ph.D.
- Vicedean: dr hab. Jadwiga Lizak, prof. WSB-NLU
- Vicedean: Michał Mółka, Ph.D,
- Vicedean: Sebastian Zupok Ph.D,
- Chancellor: Przemysław Bochenek, M.A.
- Executive Director: Sławomir Piętka, M.A.
- Quasteor: Dorota Knopf, M.A.
- Rector's Representative: Joanna Felczak, Ph.D
- Rector's Representative: prof. WSB-NLU Dariusz Reśko, Ph.D,
- Rector's Representative: prof. WSB-NLU Tadeusz Mędzelowski, Ph.D.

== History ==
- 1 October 1991 - Wyższa Szkoła Biznesu starts its activity as Sądecko-Podhalańska Szkoła Biznesu.
- 8 May 1992 – signing an agreement with National-Louis University from Chicago; as a result WSB-NLU is established, offering the program of studies given by NLU.
- 30 September 1992 - Minister of National Education, professor Andrzej Stelmachowski orders to enter Wyższa Szkoła Biznesu – National Louis University in Nowy Sącz in the register of non-public universities. WSB-NLU – is granted the authorization to offer first degree (licencjat) studies in Management and Marketing.
- 1993 – purchasing the building at ul. Zielona 27 in Nowy Sącz, together with the Stadnicki Palace in Nawojowa, it becomes the main building of the university.
- October 1993 – cooperation agreement between Craig School of Business California State University (USA) and WSB-NLU (grants for full lecture courses run by American professors for WSB-NLU students and for staff development and internships).
- May 1995 – signing an agreement with Maastricht School of Management on offering a joint program of Master of Business Administration.
- May 1995 – for the first time WSB-NLU wins the „Wprost” ranking for non-public universities, in Business Studies category it comes second after Warsaw School of Economics, ahead of all Polish universities and business schools.
- 1997 - WSB-NLU is the first university in Poland to receive an accreditation of the Association of Management Education SEM FORUM.
- 1998 – the university is given the Minister's authorization to grant its graduates the degree of magister (Master's degree) in Management and Marketing.
- 1999 – the Minister's acceptance of a new field of study at a first degree level 0 Computer Science.
- 25 September 1999 – the Monument of a Graduate is unveiled – a sculpture by Andrzej Pasoń.
- 4 November 1999 – signing an agreement with NLU, thanks to which NCA accreditation covers two first degree programs: Management and Marketing and Computer Science – their graduates, apart from the Polish licencjat title also receive its American counterpart – the Bachelor of Arts degree.
- Polish Prime Minister prof. Jerzy Buzek hands in the Pro Publico Bono award to Rector Krzysztof Pawłowski for the best civic initiative in the first decade of free Poland.
- 2000 – the university is among other schools receiving the Microsoft Certified Professional certificate. Thanks to the agreement with Microsoft, WSB-NLU students are given an opportunity of obtaining an MCP title in one of three categories: Systems Engineer, Programmer and Database Administrator.
- 2002 – another didactic premise is opened – building C, together with a library and an electronic reading room.
- 9 November 2002 – the board of Kisiel's Award granted by Wprost weekly announces that Krzysztof Pawłowski, rector of WSB-NLU is its laureate this year.
- 2002 – authorization to run first degree studies in Political Science – previously courses in Political Science, History, Philosophy and International Relations were offered as general education courses in Marketing and Management and Computer Studies.
- 2002 – offering studies in Management run exclusively in English.
- November 2003 – cooperation agreement with DePaul University (Chicago). Within this cooperation, WSB-NLU offers 2-year studies in Computer Science, graduates obtain a diploma of Master of Science in Computer Science.
- 2003 – school premises are expanded with a sports hall and a multi-purpose sports field.
- 2004 – Krzysztof Pawłowski becomes an Entrepreneur of the Year in a contest organized by Ernst & Young.
- June 2005 – WSB-NLU hosts the final tournament of the 17th International IT Competition.
- 2005 – WSB-NLU is granted a permission to offer uniform, Master's degree studies in Psychology.
- 2007 - WSB-NLU starts cooperation with Google.
- September 2007 – WSB-NLU is authorized to offer complementary, second degree studies in Political Science.
- March 2009 - DRIMAGINE – the first school of animation and 3D graphics opens at our university, supported by an Oscar-winner, Zbigniew Rybczyński.
- October 2011 - Drimagine Academy moves to Warsaw
- December 2011 - WSB-NLU has a new owner - "Agreement for the future of WSB-NLU", composed of Polish Capital and Energy Group SA, Consortium of Universities Futurus and Consortium of Non-Public Universities E-University
- 2015 - establishment of the WSB-NLU Institute of Diagnostics, Counseling and Psychological Support.
- 2016 - Establishment of the Center for Research and Programming - an internal unit of WSB-NLU, which develops all kinds of IT projects for education, higher education and business .
- 2018 International Library Conference, entitled: "Library of the Future".
- 2020 Opening of the External Branch in Racibórz.
- 2020 Recommendation given to the CLoud Academy system by the Ministry of Science and Higher Education as a system adapted to remote student learning [1].
- 2020 Creation of a specialized unit for popularization of studies in the RealTime Online model - UNIVERSITY OF VIRTUAL EDUCATION (UNIWERSYTET WIRTUALNEJ EDUKACJI)
- 2021 Opening of the University Branch in Kielce.

== Types and fields of study ==
Full-time studies are conducted only in the campus in Nowy Sacz.

- management: bachelor's and master's degree full-time, part-time and interactive form - RealTime Online.
- computer science: engineering degree full-time, part-time and interactive - RealTime Online.
- psychology: 5-year master's degree in full-time, part-time and interactive form - RealTime Online.
- law: 5-year master's degree in full-time, part-time and interactive form - RealTime Online.

== Interactive online studies RealTime Online with the Cloud Academy™ platform ==
In this model, the classes and lectures are carried out by analogy with the part-time form of education, on weekends (Friday after 5:00 p.m., Saturday and Sunday), on average twice a month.

- Lectures are conducting at the university and, additionally, they are transmission via the Cloud Academy™ system and are archived on the platform.
- Classes are conducting only remotely, using the Cloud Academy™ system.

The student can participate in interactive classes using any mobile device with Internet access, after the end of the classes, they can replay them (lectures) as many times as student want at a convenient time until the end of the academic year (all lectures are continuously archived in the system).

== Ranking ==
- 2022/2023 WSB-NLU among the most frequently chosen universities of non-public part-time studies according to of the MEiN ranking
- November 2022 Receiving the "FUNDAMENT" award from the Polish Congress of Entrepreneurship
- 2021/2022 WSB-NLU among the most frequently chosen universities of non-public part-time studies according to of the MEiN ranking
- 2020/2021 WSB-NLU among the most frequently chosen universities of non-public part-time studies according to of the MEiN ranking
- 2018 First place in the competition of the Perspektywy portal for the best recruitment event
- 2017 awarding the Cloud Academy system an award in the "Product" category in the Highest Quality International competition organized under the auspices of PARP, the Polish Committee for Standardization and the Department of Quality Management at the Cracow University of Economics
- 2017 Wyższa Szkoła Biznesu - National Louis University among the most popular universities in Poland according to the ranking of the Ministry of Science and Higher Education
- May 27, 2010 Academic Information Center - "The most innovative and creative university in Poland" - 3rd place
- May 25, 2010 Home&Market - 3rd place for MBA students
- May 10, 2010 "Wprost" - 3rd place in the category "Non-public business universities"
- June 2009 The Cogito Report - 3rd place in the Ranking of the Academic Environment in the "Prestigious University" category
- 2008 RANKING OF UNIVERSITIES IN THE OPINION OF PERSONAL DIRECTORS. In the category of private universities: 2nd place among universities educating in the field of Computer Science, 4th place among universities educating in the field of Political Science, 5th place among universities educating in the field of Management
- June 13, 2007 "Polityka" - Third place among non-state universities in the category of Political Science
- May 27, 2007 "Wprost" - The best private school of business and management
- April 19, 2007 "Rzeczpospolita" - Highly rated scientific potential (parametric assessment). The highest rated study conditions (categories: didactic base, subscription to foreign magazines, computerization of library resources). WSB-NLU highest rated by
- 3 June 2006 "Polityka". The human resources potential of the Political Science major was rated the highest among all the surveyed universities
- May 21, 2006 Newsweek. A significant increase in the value of WSB-NLU graduates on the labor market
- May 2, 2006 "Wprost". For the 13th time, WSB-NLU took first place in the ranking of the weekly "Wprost", among non-state universities in the category "Where to study business management"
- April 19, 2006 "Rzeczpospolita". WSB-NLU as the University best rated by employers
- March 2006 "Home&Market". The best private business school in Malopolskie
- April 18, 2005 "Wprost". WSB-NLU three times the best in the assessment of the school's intellectual background, the education process and career opportunities and study conditions
- April 12, 2005 "Rzeczpospolita". WSB-NLU is the best for the employers
- April 11, 2005 ERGO. WSB-NLU - the second among private schools, business universities
- April 2, 2005 "Polityka". Third place among non-state institutions in the category Economy - Management
- March 2005 "Home&Market" 2005. Sixth place in the assessment of study conditions
- April 26, 2004 "Wprost". The best non-state business university
- April 14, 2004 "Rzeczpospolita" and "Perspektywy". WSB-NLU graduates are the most wanted employees
- April 3, 2004 "Polityka". 2nd place in the category of Economics and Management and 3rd place in the category of IT among private universities
- March 16, 2004 Newsweek. Effectiveness in preparing graduates to get a good job
- September 23, 2003 Krzysztof Pawłowski Entrepreneur of the Year 2003, for carrying out the mission of education at the highest level
- May 12, 2003 "Wprost". The best non-state business university
- April 24, 2003 A three-person team of second-year students of Management, Marketing and Computer Science: Barbara Żbik-Badek, Janusz Garścia and Andrzej Szymczak once again won the international competition "Global Marketplace Competition".
- April 18, 2003 L'Oreal Marketing Award won by WSB-NLU students
- April 15, 2003 "Rzeczpospolita" and "Perspektywy". In the ranking of universities, WSB-NLU was ranked fourth
- April 1, 2003 "Home&Market". In the ranking of non-state schools, WSB-NLU was ranked second
- March 31, 2003 "Home&Market". Sixth place in terms of Graduates in independent positions
- March 29, 2003 "Polityka". WSB-NLU took second place among non-state universities
- November 9, 2002 Kisiel Award for the Rector of WSB-NLU
- May 13, 2002 "Wprost". WSB-NLU is the best in the classification "Where to study business management", in the category "Where to study computer science?" the Nowy Sącz university won the second place among non-state universities
- May 8, 2002 Marketplace. Students won first place in the International "Global Internet MarketPlace Competition" organized by the University of Tennessee, Knoxville, USA
- April 17, 2002 "Polityka". Wyższa Szkoła Biznesu – National-Louis University took 2nd place among non-state universities
- April 9, 2002 "Rzeczpospolita" and "Perspektywy". WSB-NLU took 2nd place

== See also ==
- National-Louis University
