= Kamienica (river) =

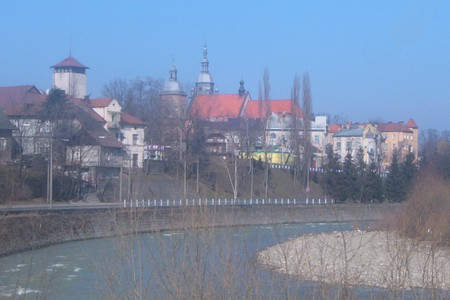

Location
- Country: Poland

Physical characteristics
- Mouth
  - location: Dunajec
  - coordinates: 49°37′54″N 20°41′19″E

Basin features
- Progression: Dunajec→ Vistula→ Baltic Sea

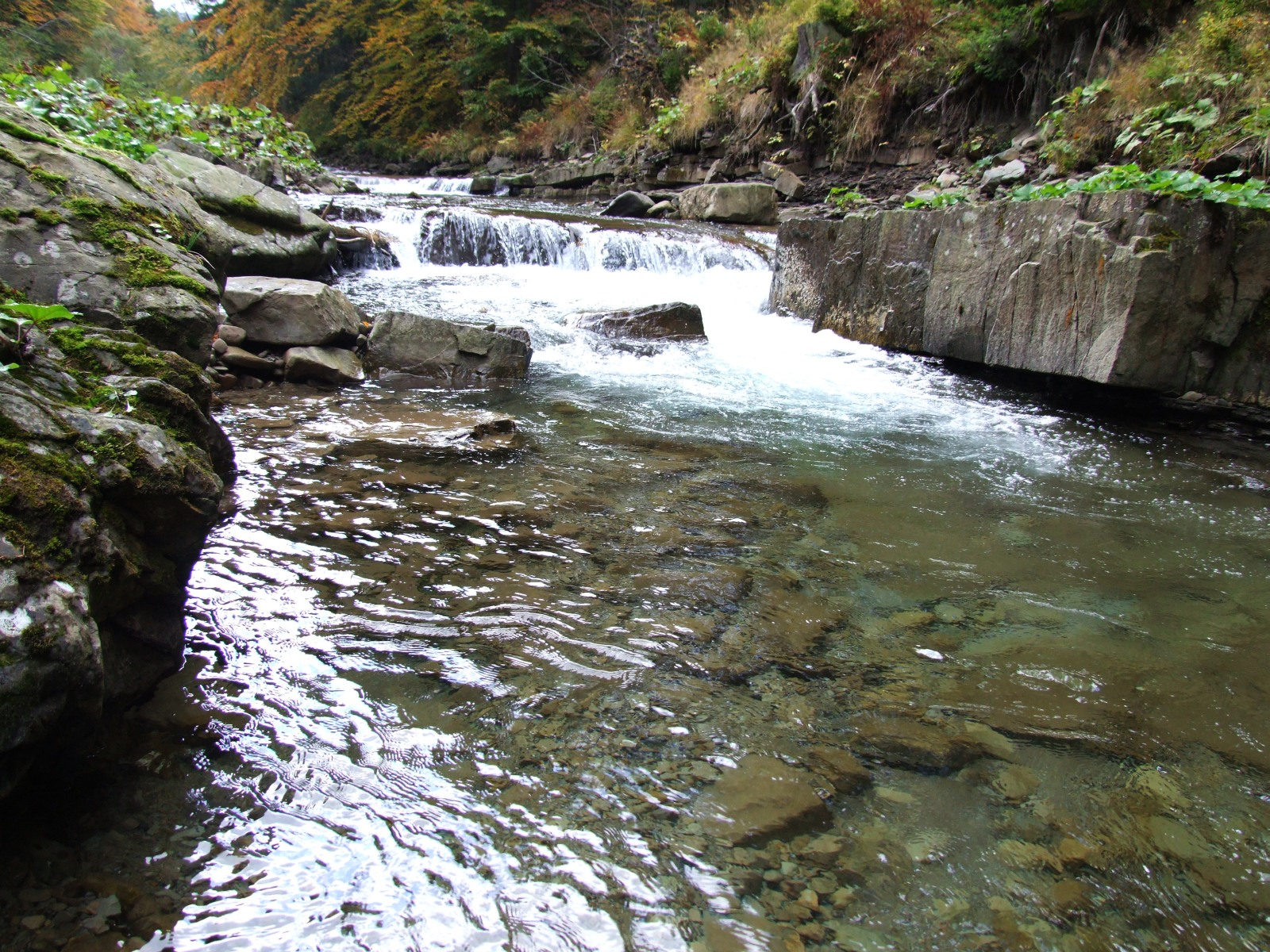
Kamienica next to Trusiówka

Kamienica is a river in the Gorce Mountains, partly on the border with the Beskids, the left tributary of the Dunajec River. It squeezes through a deep valley between the slopes of Mostownica and Jaworzyna Kamienicka, flowing through a ravine 8–12 m deep. In the vicinity of the Borek Pass it bends sharply to the east, causing strong erosion of the slopes of this pass. This is an attractive tourist area. In its upper reaches (to Rivers) it flows within the boundaries of the Gorce National Park. Marked here, through the valley of Kamienica blue trail to Borek pass.

Below Rzki Kamienica flows down a deep and narrow valley between Gorceńska Kiczora Kamienicka and Wielki Wierch on the one hand, and the Beskid massif of Jasień and Mogielica on the other. It continues to flow through Szczawa, Kamienica and at an altitude of 363 meters it flows into the Dunajec River in Zabrzez. The length of its course is 32 km, and the gradient is 25 m/km.

According to Jerzy Kondracki's previous geographic regionalization of Poland, the section from the mouth of the Głębieniec stream to the mouth of the Dunajec River forms the border between the Gorce Mountains and the Beskid Wyspowy. Numerous rock exposures, boulders, and thresholds can be found in its bed. Among the most interesting are the Spad waterfall and the "Green Banior" banior.

Kamienica's larger tributaries are:

- Left-bank: Miazgowy, Stawieniec, Gorcowy Potok, Mogielica, Szczawa, Zbludza.
- Right-banked: Wspólny Potok, Ustępny, Golkow, Koryciska, Spaleniec, Czerwonka, Rybi, Glêbieniec, Zasadny Potok, Górkowy Potok, Cisowy Potok.

After intense and prolonged rainfall, the Kamienica rapidly rises, sometimes overflowing from its bed. This was the case in July 2018, May 2014, 2010 or 1997, among others, when it destroyed bridges and roads, including DW 968, and sometimes human homes. Of the plants that are rare in Poland, there is a Primula matthioli in the stream valley (under Mostownica).

Around 1880, there were 16 mills, 8 sawmills and a forge on Kamienica, powered by water wheels.

== Hiking trail ==
Rzeki (Lubomierz) – Kamienica valley – Papieżówka – Trusiówka – Borek Pass (here it connects with the yellow trail to Turbacz). Walking time about 3 h, ↓ 2:30 h.
