= Harbutowice =

Harbutowice may refer to several villages in Poland:

- Harbutowice, Lesser Poland Voivodeship - village in Myślenice County, Lesser Poland Voivodeship
- Harbutowice, Silesian Voivodeship - village in Cieszyn County, Silesian Voivodeship
