= Lipnik, Lesser Poland Voivodeship =

Lipnik
- Village
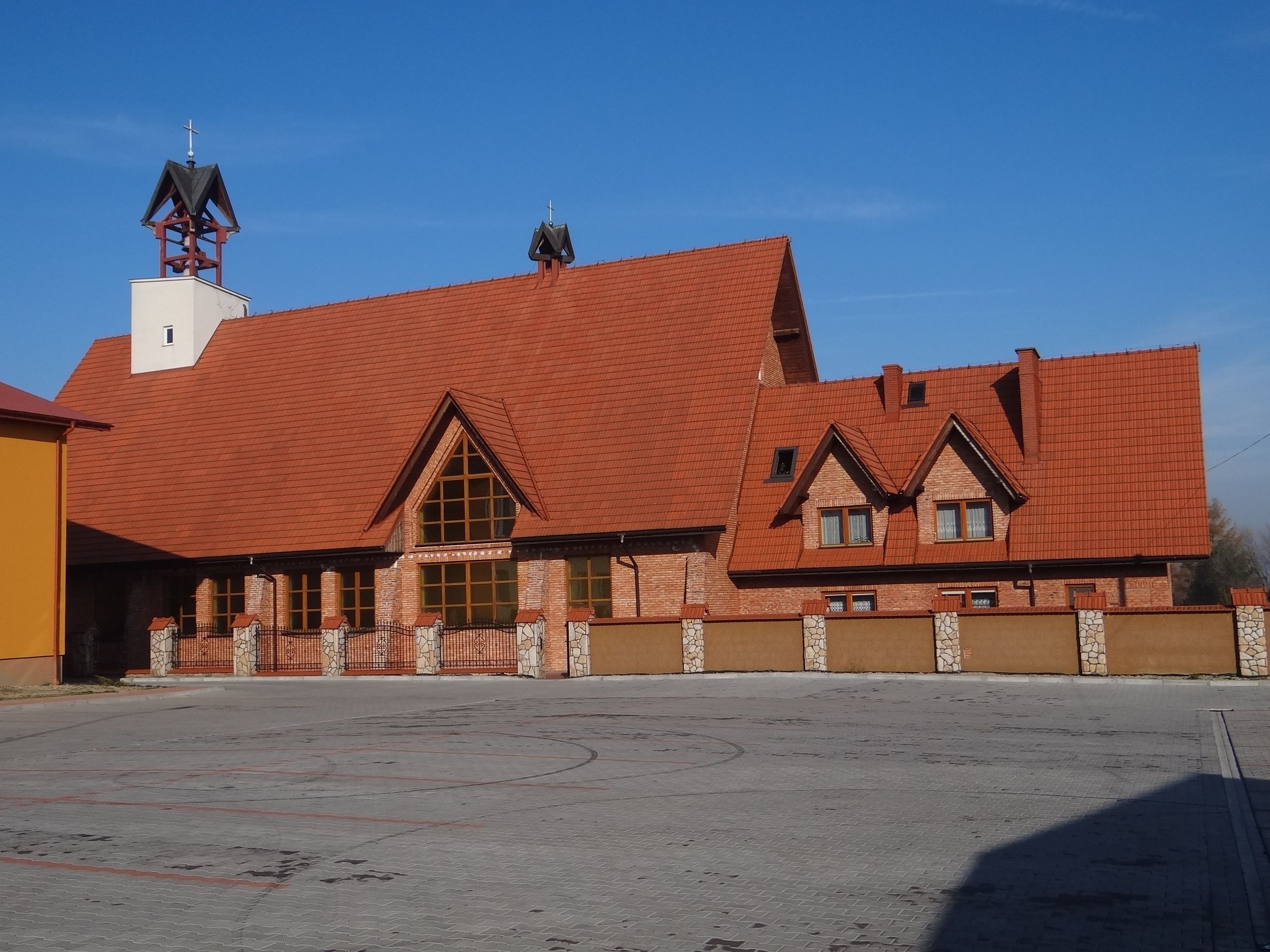
- Catholic church

- Location within Poland
- Coordinates: 49°47′N 20°4′E
- Country: Poland
- Voivodeship: Lesser Poland
- County: Myślenice
- Gmina: Wiśniowa
- Elevation: 340 m (1,120 ft)
- Population: 1,600

Lipnik (Polish pronunciation: [ˈlipɲik]) is a village in the administrative district of Gmina Wiśniowa, within Myślenice County, Lesser Poland Voivodeship, in southern Poland.
