= Jodłownik =

Jodłownik may refer to the following places in Poland:

- Jodłownik, Lower Silesian Voivodeship (south-west Poland)
- Jodłownik, Lesser Poland Voivodeship (south Poland)
