= Bogdanówka =

- Village
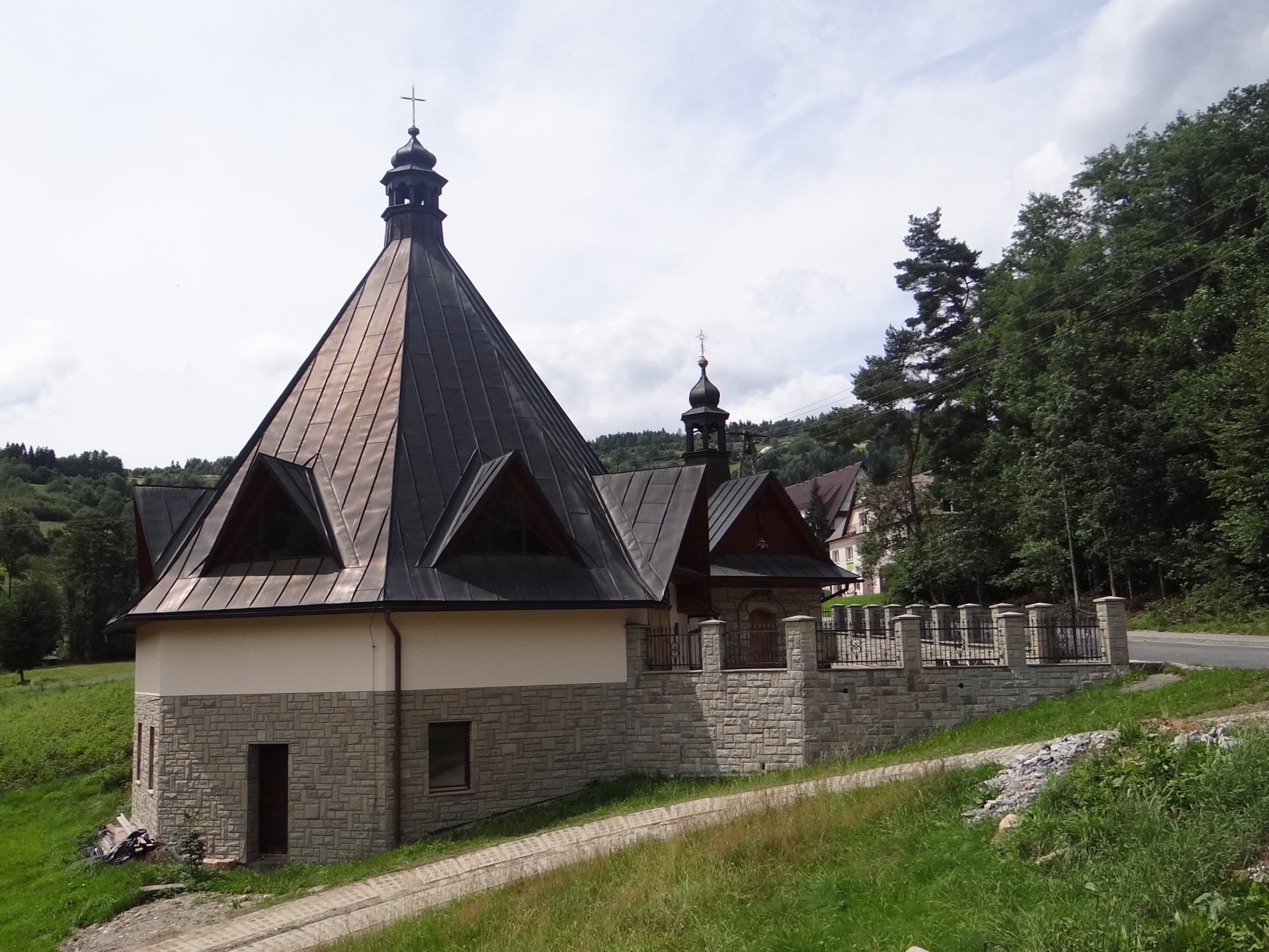
- Church of Saint John the Baptist

- Location within Poland
- Coordinates: 49°45′N 19°49′E
- Country: Poland
- Voivodeship: Lesser Poland
- County: Myślenice
- Gmina: Tokarnia

Bogdanówka [bɔɡdaˈnufka] is a village in the administrative district of Gmina Tokarnia, within Myślenice County, Lesser Poland Voivodeship, in southern Poland.
