= Czasław, Lesser Poland Voivodeship =

Czasław
- Village
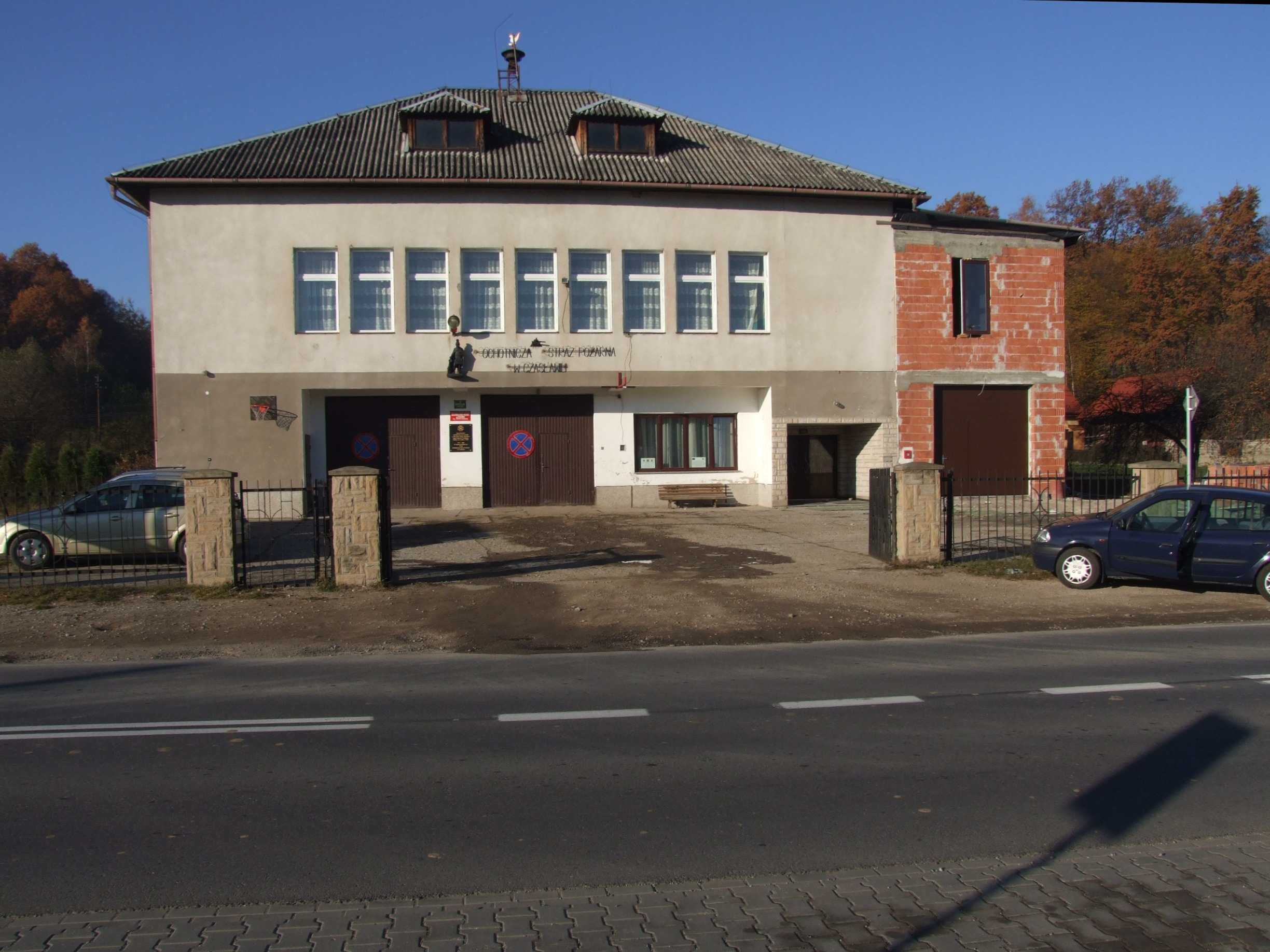
- Fire station

- Location within Poland
- Coordinates: 49°52′N 20°9′E
- Country: Poland
- Voivodeship: Lesser Poland
- County: Myślenice
- Gmina: Raciechowice

Czasław [ˈt͡ʂaswaf] is a village in the administrative district of Gmina Raciechowice, within Myślenice County, Lesser Poland Voivodeship, in southern Poland.
