= Rudnik, Gmina Sułkowice =

Rudnik
- Village
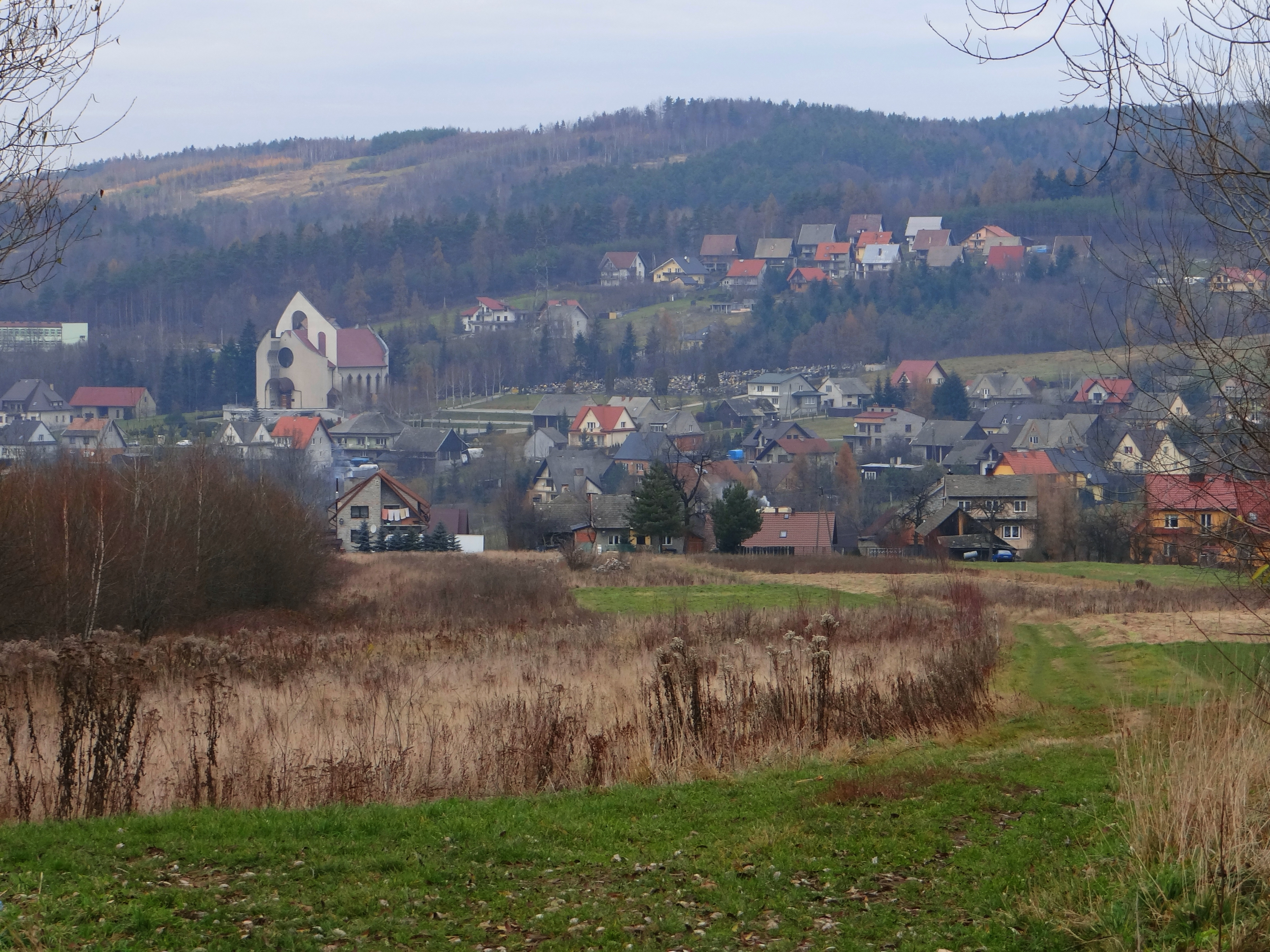

- Location within Poland
- Coordinates: 49°51′7″N 19°51′14″E
- Country: Poland
- Voivodeship: Lesser Poland
- County: Myślenice
- Gmina: Sułkowice
- Population (approx.): 3,000
- Website: http://www.rudnik2000.republika.pl

Rudnik [ˈrudɲik] is a village in the administrative district of Gmina Sułkowice, within Myślenice County, Lesser Poland Voivodeship, in southern Poland.

The village has an approximate population of 3,000.
