= Poznachowice Górne =

- Village
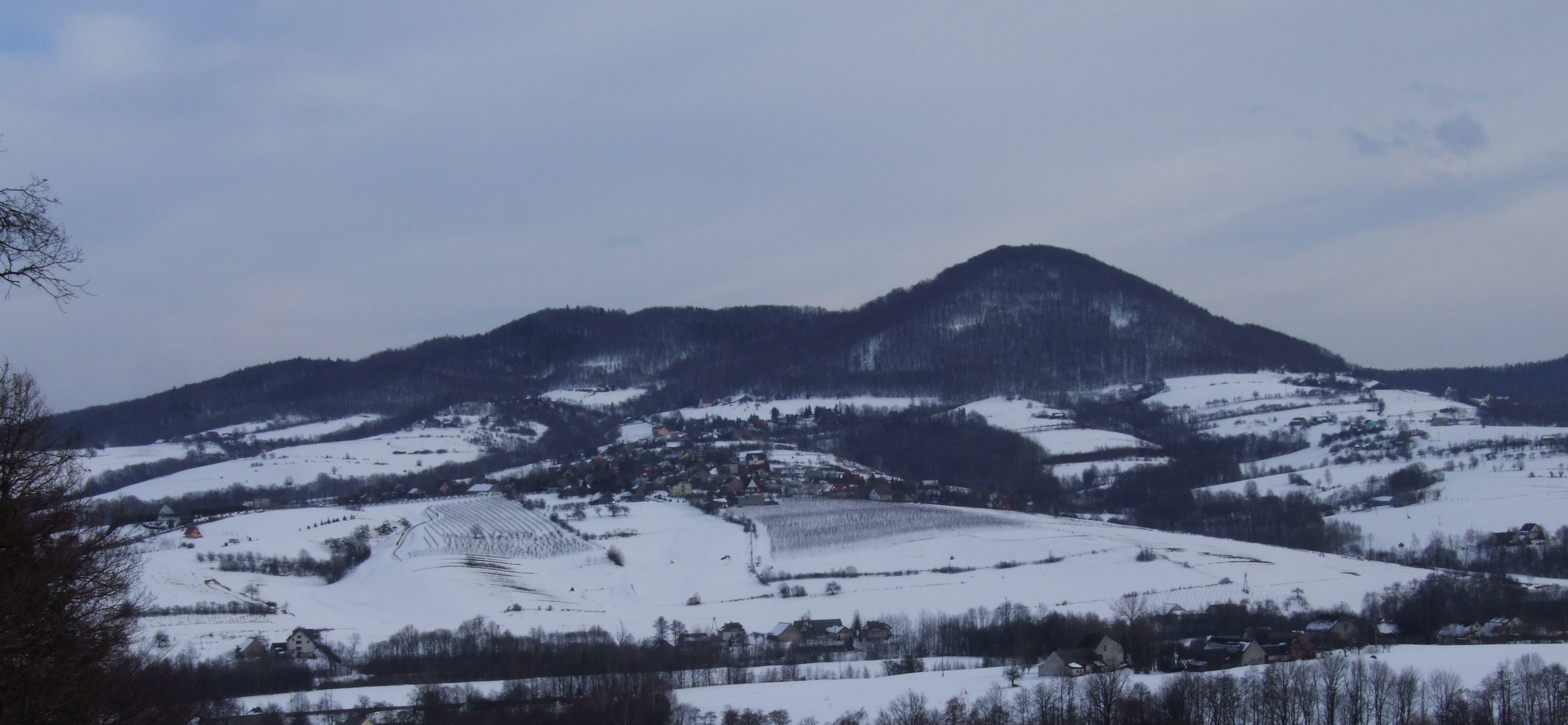

- Location within Poland
- Coordinates: 49°49′24″N 20°8′8″E
- Country: Poland
- Voivodeship: Lesser Poland
- County: Myślenice
- Gmina: Raciechowice
- Population: 400

Poznachowice Górne (Polish pronunciation: [pɔznaxɔˈvit͡sɛ ˈɡurnɛ]) is a village in the administrative district of Gmina Raciechowice, within Myślenice County, Lesser Poland Voivodeship, in southern Poland.
