= Tenczyn =

- Village
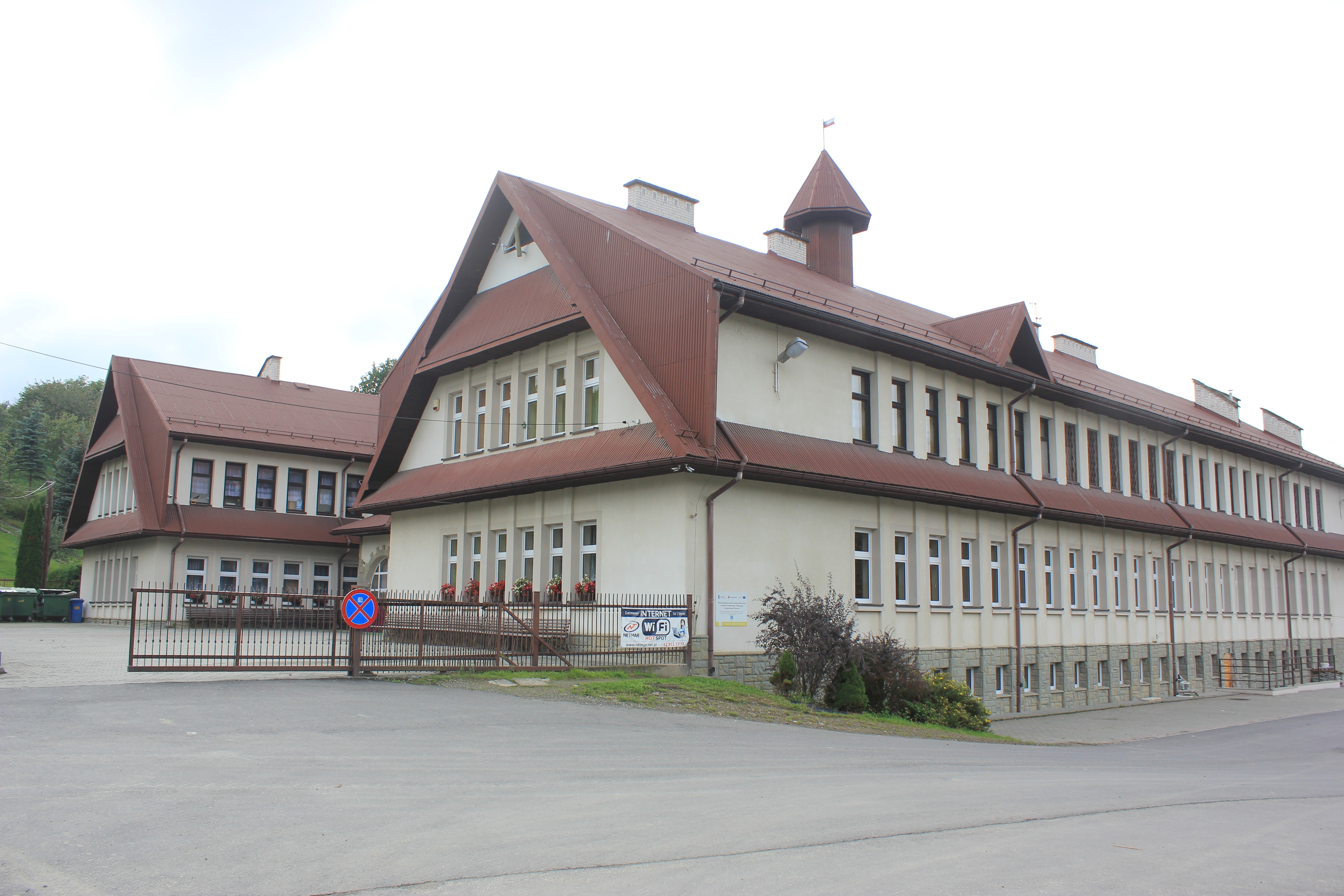
- School

- Location within Poland
- Coordinates: 49°41′N 19°58′E
- Country: Poland
- Voivodeship: Lesser Poland
- County: Myślenice
- Gmina: Lubień
- Population: 1,900

Tenczyn [ˈtɛnt͡ʂɨn] is a village in the administrative district of Gmina Lubień, within Myślenice County, Lesser Poland Voivodeship, in southern Poland.
