= Żerosławice =

- Village
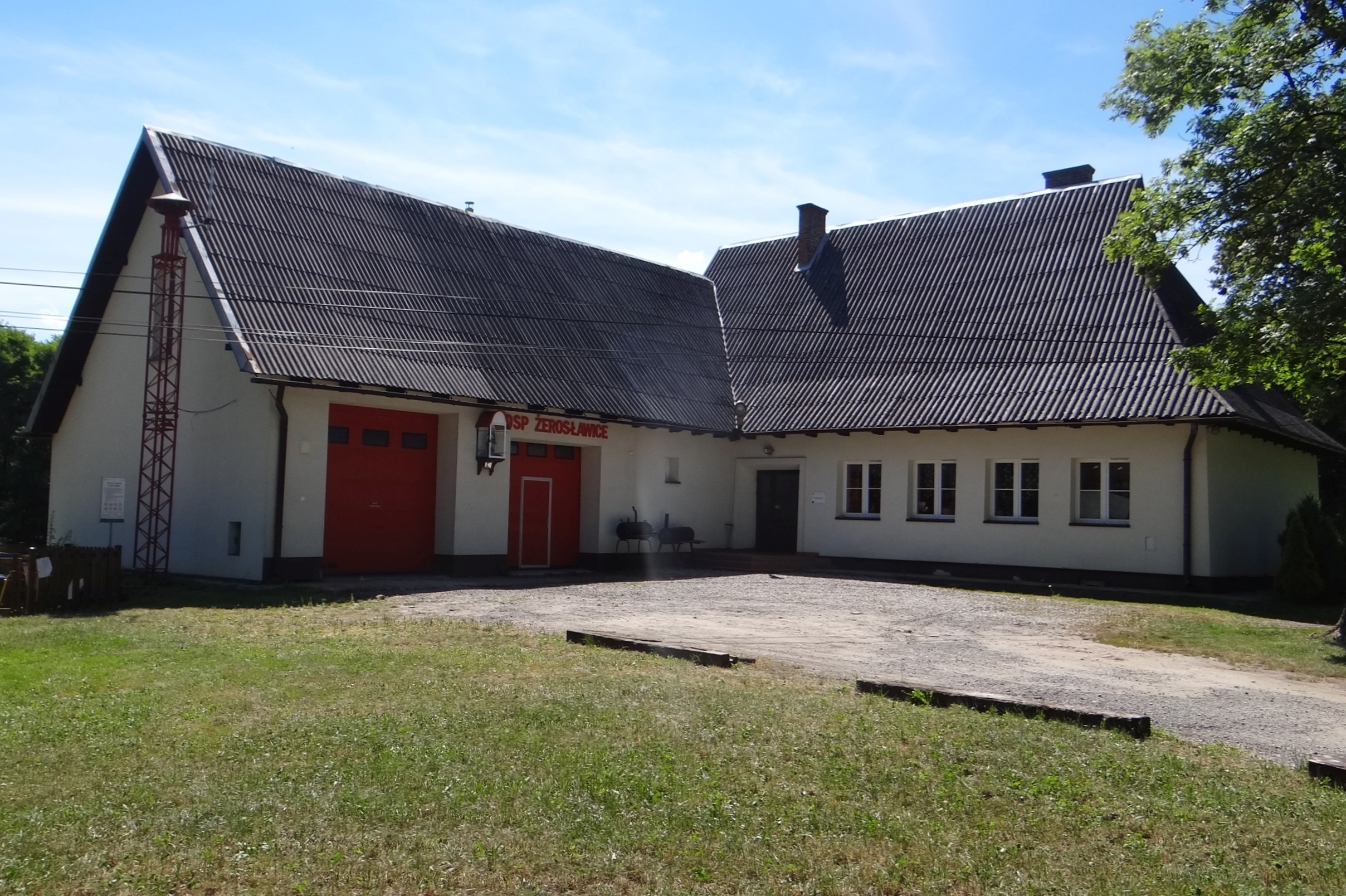
- Fire station

- Location within Poland
- Coordinates: 49°50′N 20°15′E
- Country: Poland
- Voivodeship: Lesser Poland
- County: Myślenice
- Gmina: Raciechowice

Żerosławice [ʐɛrɔswaˈvit͡sɛ] is a village in the administrative district of Gmina Raciechowice, within Myślenice County, Lesser Poland Voivodeship, in southern Poland.

Official site of Żerosławice
