= Gmina Wiśniowa =

Gmina Wiśniowa may refer to either of the following rural administrative districts in Poland:

- Gmina Wiśniowa, Lesser Poland Voivodeship
- Gmina Wiśniowa, Subcarpathian Voivodeship
