= Zegartowice, Lesser Poland Voivodeship =

Zegartowice
- Village
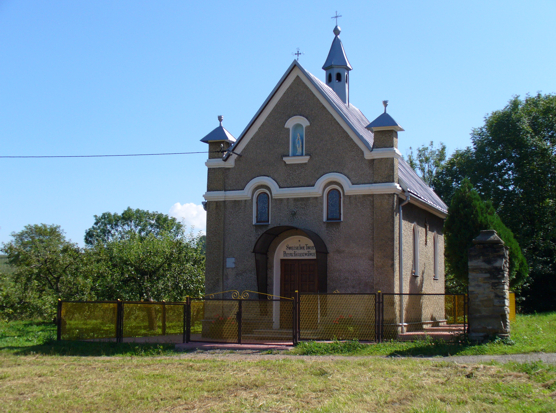
- Chapel in the village

- Location within Poland
- Coordinates: 49°49′37″N 20°11′26″E
- Country: Poland
- Voivodeship: Lesser Poland
- County: Myślenice
- Gmina: Raciechowice

Zegartowice [zɛɡartɔˈvit͡sɛ] is a village in the administrative district of Gmina Raciechowice, within Myślenice County, Lesser Poland Voivodeship, in southern Poland.
