= Mstów =

Mstów may refer to:

- Mstów, Lesser Poland Voivodeship, a village in Limanowa County, Poland
- Mstów, Silesian Voivodeship, a village in Częstochowa County, Poland
- Gmina Mstów, a gmina in Silesian Voivodeship, Poland
