= Kawec =

- Village
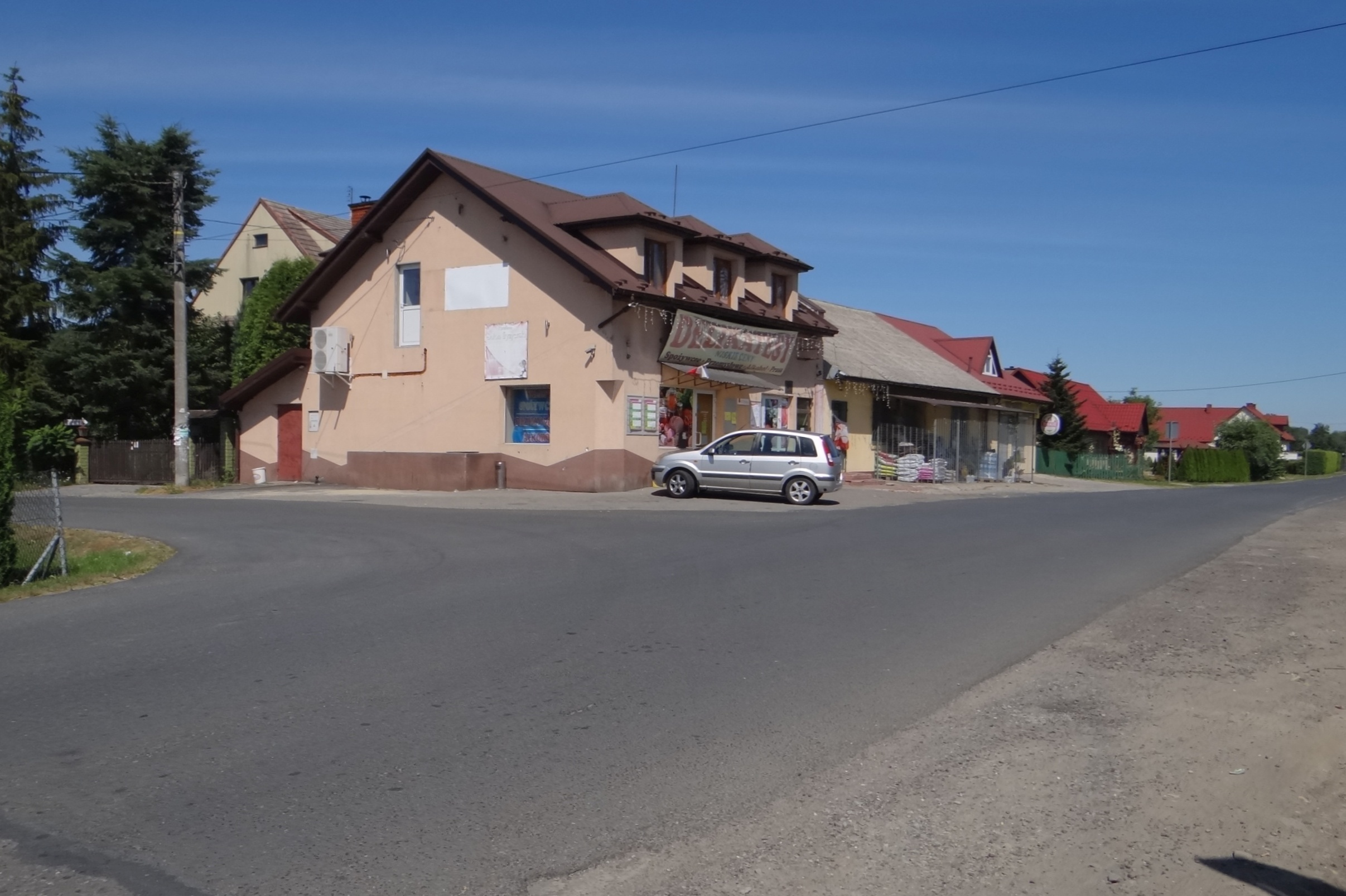

- Location within Poland
- Coordinates: 49°51′N 20°14′E
- Country: Poland
- Voivodeship: Lesser Poland
- County: Myślenice
- Gmina: Raciechowice

Kawec [ˈkavɛt͡s] is a village in the administrative district of Gmina Raciechowice, within Myślenice County, Lesser Poland Voivodeship, in southern Poland.
