= Krzyworzeka, Lesser Poland Voivodeship =

Krzyworzeka
- Village
- Location within Poland
- Coordinates: 49°52′N 20°8′E
- Country: Poland
- Voivodeship: Lesser Poland
- County: Myślenice
- Gmina: Raciechowice

Krzyworzeka [kʂɨvɔˈʐɛka] is a village in the administrative district of Gmina Raciechowice, within Myślenice County, Lesser Poland Voivodeship, in southern Poland.
