= Skomielna Biała =

- Village
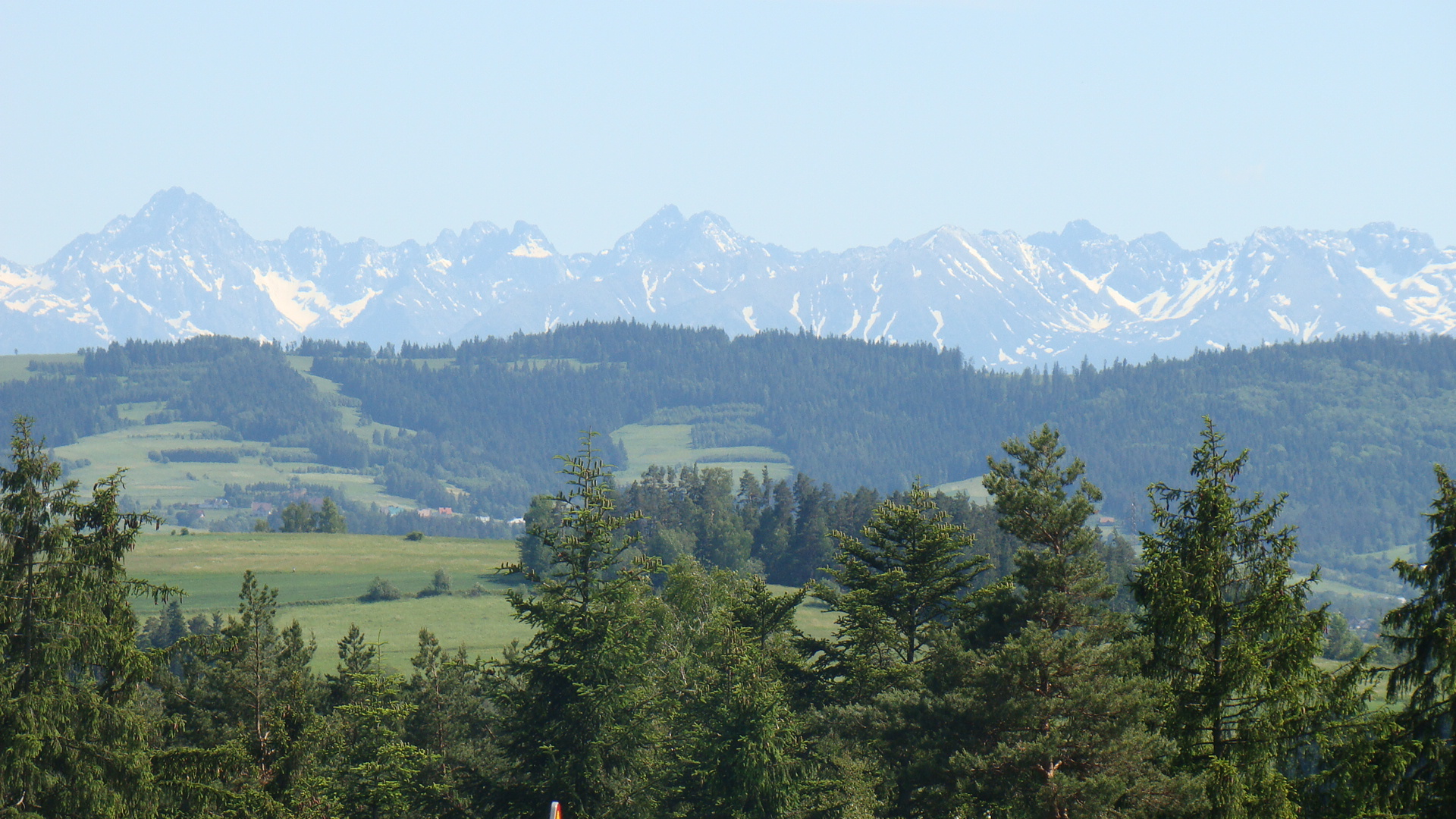
- View from Skomielna Biała, with the Tatra Mountains in the background

- Location within Poland
- Coordinates: 49°39′N 19°55′E
- Country: Poland
- Voivodeship: Lesser Poland
- Powiat: Myślenice
- Gmina: Lubień
- Established: 14th century
- Area: 14 km^{2} (5.4 sq mi)
- Population (2006): 2,700
- Time zone: UTC+1 (CET)
  - Summer (DST): UTC+2 (CEST)
- Postal code: 32-434
- Area code: +48 18
- Car Plates: KMY
- Website: skomielna.pl

Skomielna Biała [skɔˈmjɛlna ˈbjawa] is a village situated in southern Poland (Lesser Poland Voivodeship, Myślenice County, Lubień rural commune).
