= Skomielna Czarna =

- Village
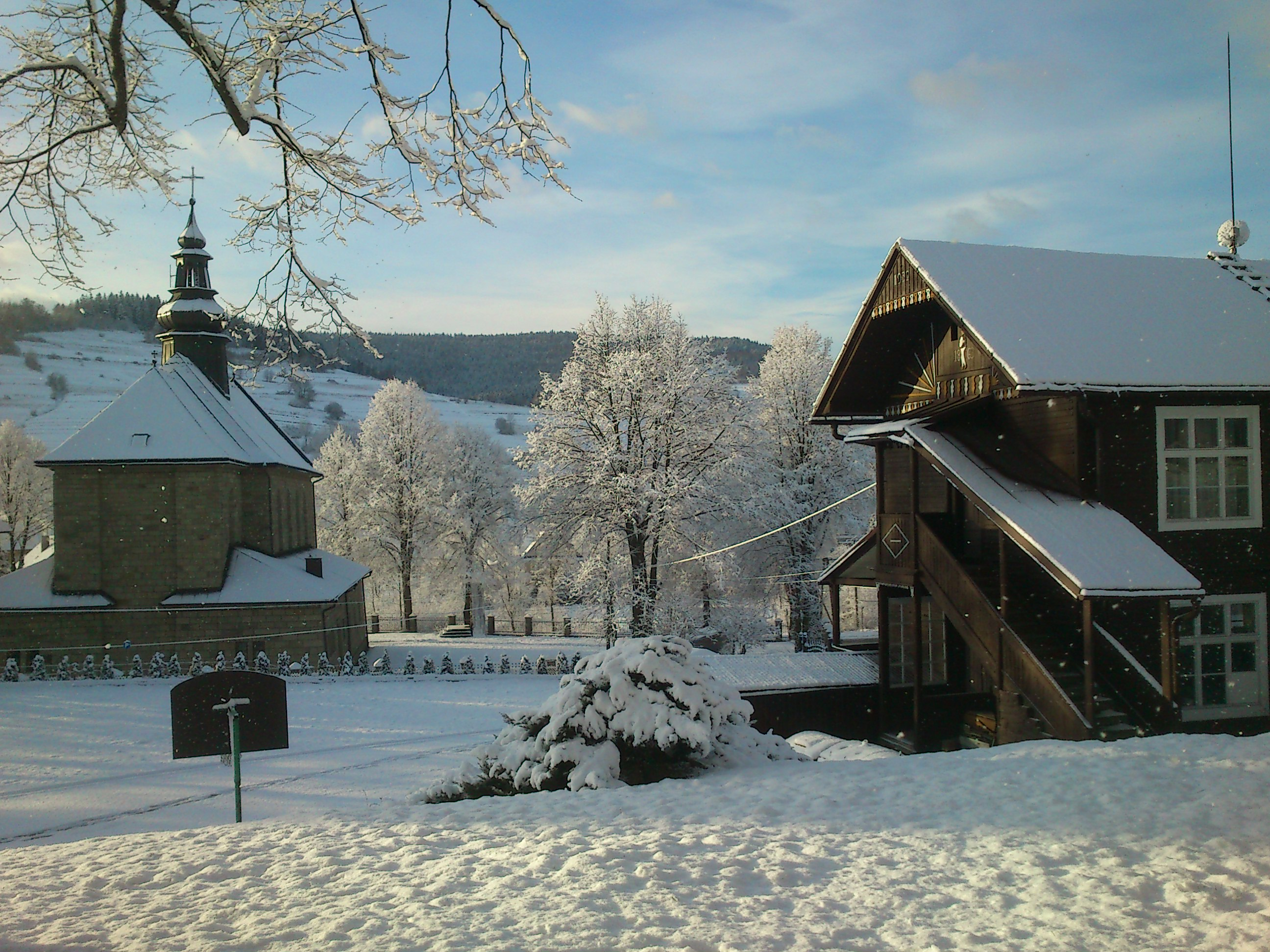
- Church of the Visitation of the Virgin Mary in winter

- Location within Poland
- Coordinates: 49°44′N 19°50′E
- Country: Poland
- Voivodeship: Lesser Poland
- County: Myślenice
- Gmina: Tokarnia

Population
  - Total: 1,400

Skomielna Czarna [skɔˈmjɛlna ˈt͡ʂarna] is a village in the administrative district of Gmina Tokarnia, within Myślenice County, Lesser Poland Voivodeship, in southern Poland.
