= Dąbie, Lesser Poland Voivodeship =

Dąbie
- Village
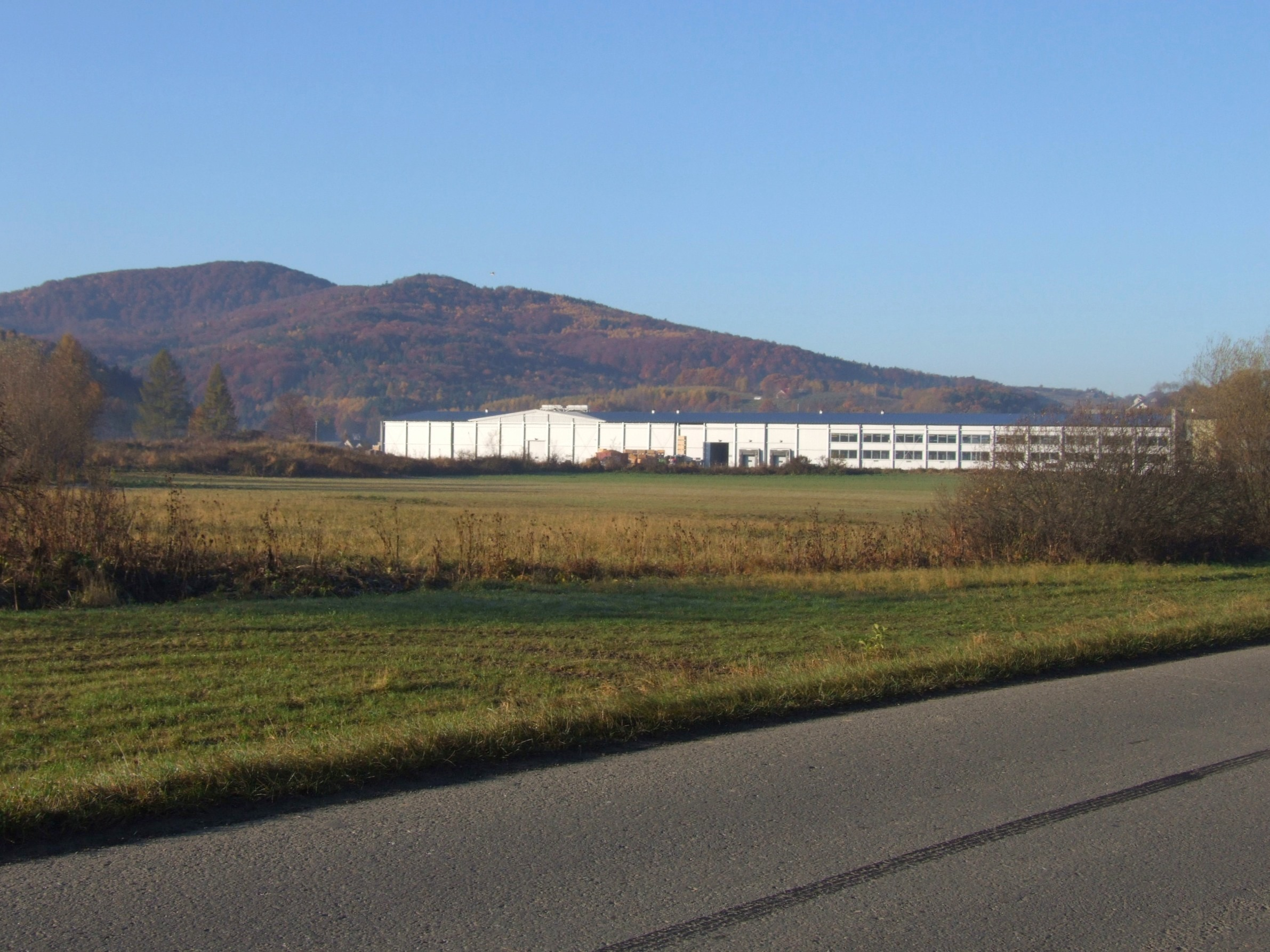
- Grodzisko Mountain. In the foreground, the packaging factory in Zegartowice

- Location within Poland
- Coordinates: 49°49′36″N 20°10′05″E
- Country: Poland
- Voivodeship: Lesser Poland
- County: Myślenice
- Gmina: Raciechowice

Dąbie [ˈdɔmbjɛ] is a village in the administrative district of Gmina Raciechowice, within Myślenice County, Lesser Poland Voivodeship, in southern Poland.
