= Więciórka =

- Village
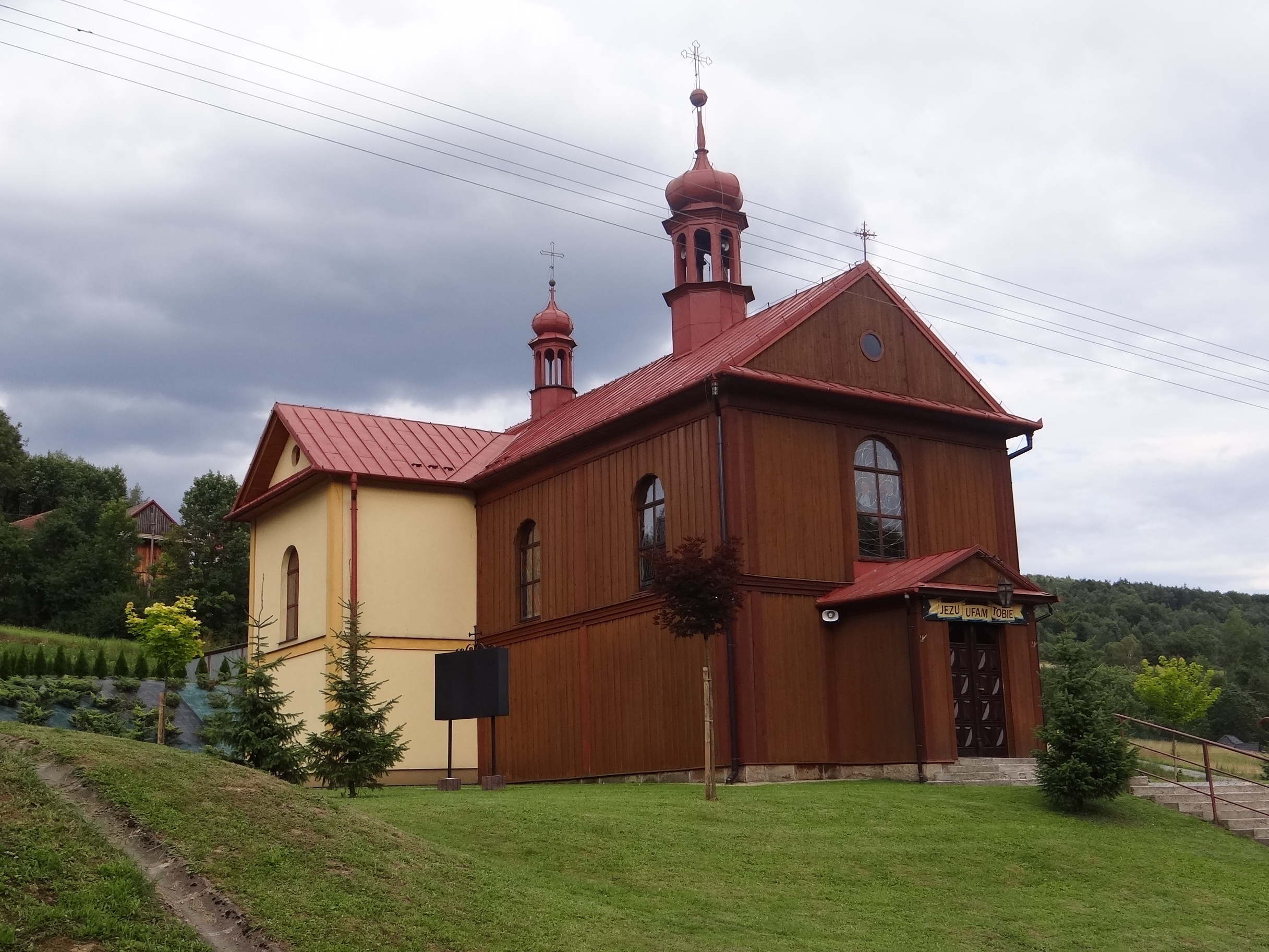
- Church of Our Lady of Ostra Brama

- Location within Poland
- Coordinates: 49°46′N 19°51′E
- Country: Poland
- Voivodeship: Lesser Poland
- County: Myślenice
- Gmina: Tokarnia

Więciórka [vjɛnˈt͡ɕurka] is a village in the administrative district of Gmina Tokarnia, within Myślenice County, Lesser Poland Voivodeship, in southern Poland.
