= Biertowice =

- Village
- Location within Poland
- Coordinates: 49°53′N 19°48′E
- Country: Poland
- Voivodeship: Lesser Poland
- County: Myślenice
- Gmina: Sułkowice
- Population: 900

Biertowice [bʲɛrtɔˈvʲit͡sɛ] is a village in the administrative district of Gmina Sułkowice, within Myślenice County, Lesser Poland Voivodeship, in southern Poland.
