= Glichów =

- Village
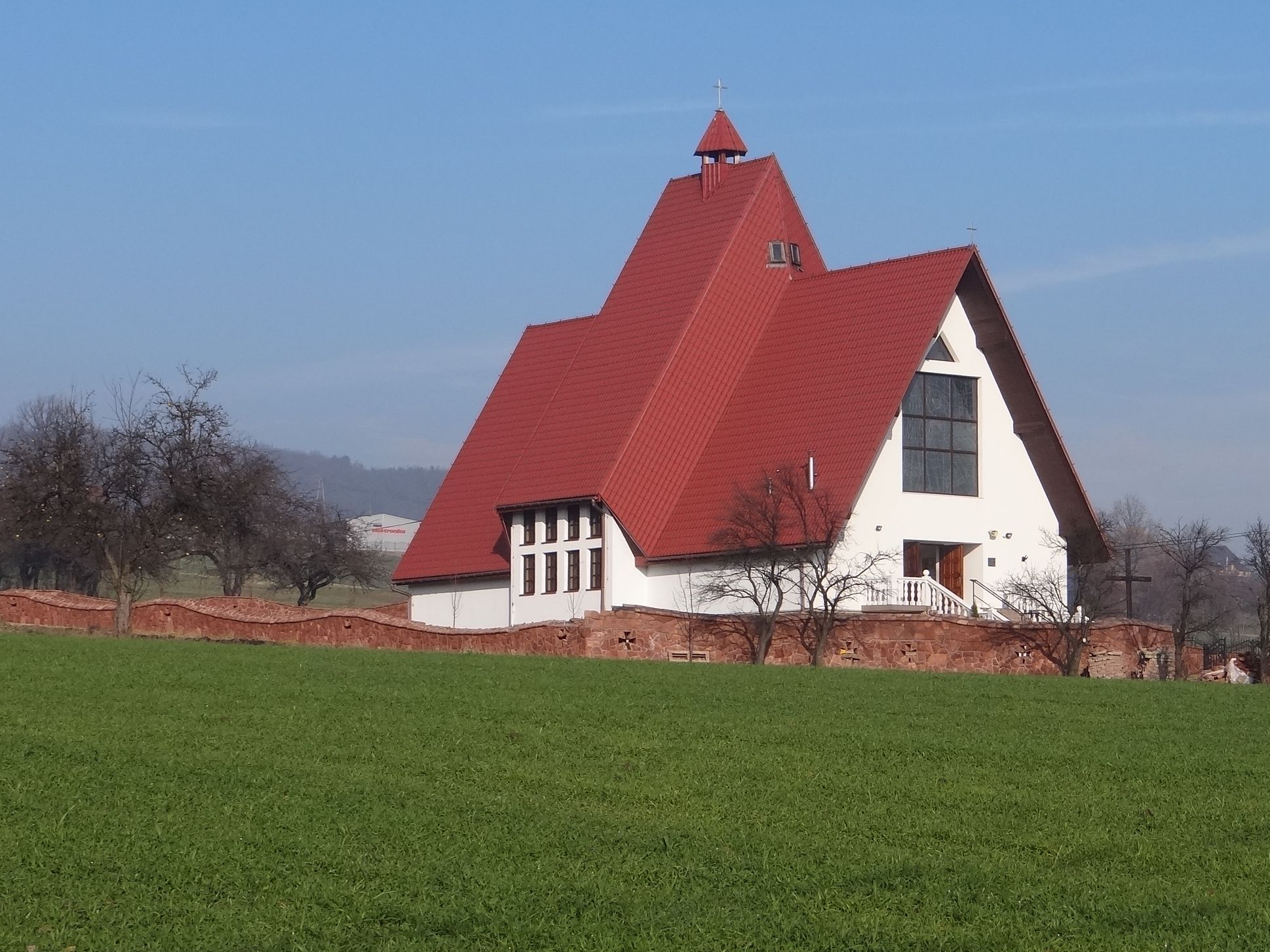
- Catholic church

- Location within Poland
- Coordinates: 49°50′N 20°7′E
- Country: Poland
- Voivodeship: Lesser Poland
- County: Myślenice
- Gmina: Wiśniowa
- Population: 480

Glichów [ˈɡlixuf] is a village in the administrative district of Gmina Wiśniowa, within Myślenice County, Lesser Poland Voivodeship, in southern Poland.
