= Kobielnik =

- Village
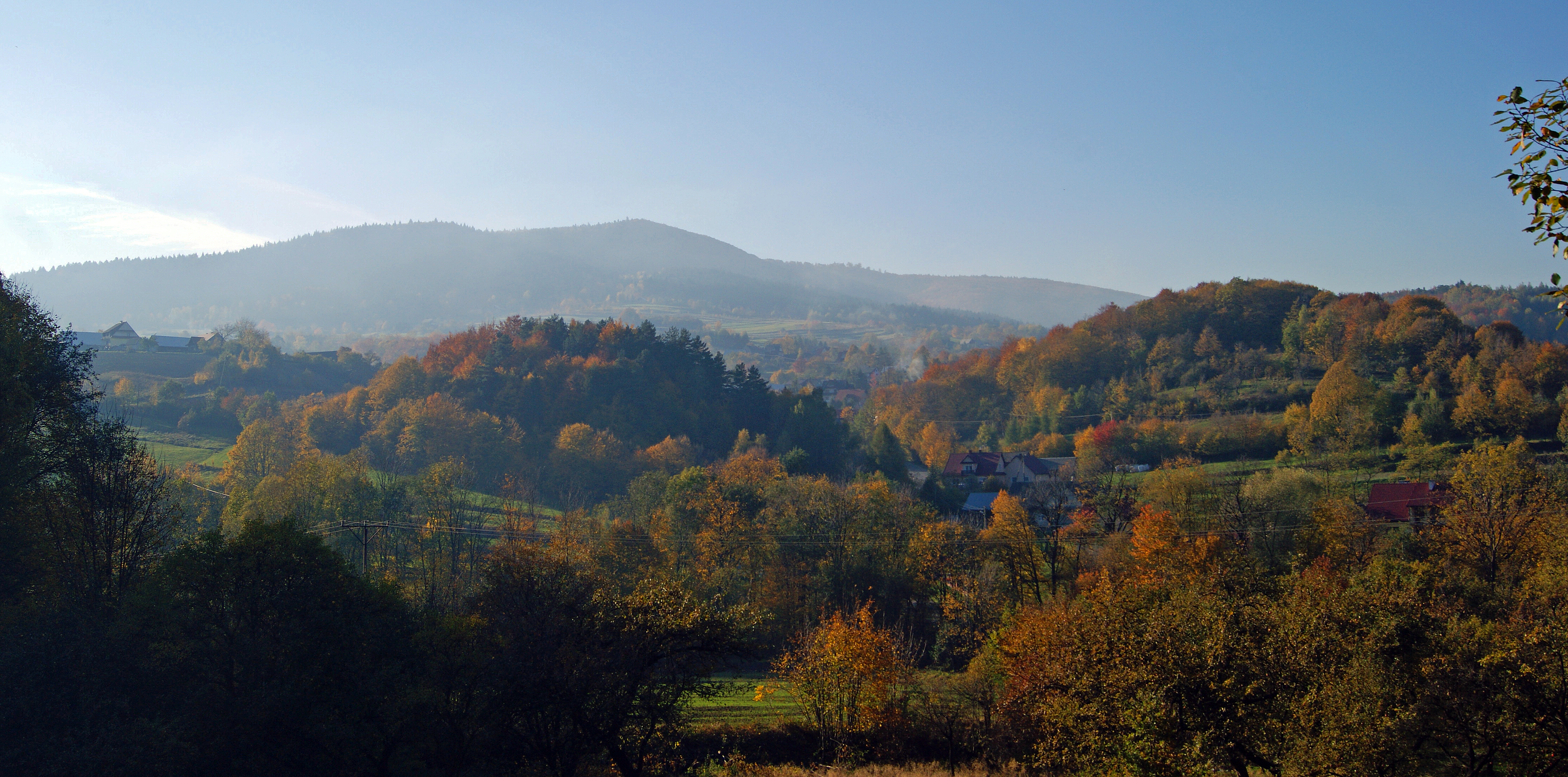

- Location within Poland
- Coordinates: 49°47′N 20°7′E
- Country: Poland
- Voivodeship: Lesser Poland
- County: Myślenice
- Gmina: Wiśniowa

Kobielnik [kɔˈbjɛlnik] is a village in the administrative district of Gmina Wiśniowa, within Myślenice County, Lesser Poland Voivodeship, in southern Poland.
