= Komorniki, Lesser Poland Voivodeship =

Komorniki
- Village
- Location within Poland
- Coordinates: 49°50′34″N 20°9′15″E
- Country: Poland
- Voivodeship: Lesser Poland
- County: Myślenice
- Gmina: Raciechowice

Komorniki [kɔmɔrˈniki] is a village in the administrative district of Gmina Raciechowice, within Myślenice County, Lesser Poland Voivodeship, in southern Poland.
