= Adam Fiut =

Polish actor (1933–1966)

- Born: 17 June 1933; Kraków, Poland
- Died: 14 December 1966 (aged 33) near Lubień, Lesser Poland Voivodeship, Polish People's Republic
- Education: AST National Academy of Theatre Arts in Kraków
- Occupation: Film and theater actor

Adam Fiut (Kraków, 17 June 1933 – near Lubień, 14 December 1966) was a Polish film and theater actor.

== Filmography ==
As an actor
Year	Title	Role	Director(s)
1955	Rower	Bicycle dealer	Roman Polanski
1956	Koniec nocy	Filip Janik	Julian Dziedzina; Paweł Komorowski
1957	Spotkania	Wiktor	Stanisław Lenartowicz
1957	Zagubione uczucia	Maniek, gang boss	Jerzy Zarzycki

As self
Year	Title	Role	Director(s)
2010	Cracow by Polanski	Adam Fiut (self)	Maciej Grabysa
