= Kwapinka =

- Village
- Location within Poland
- Coordinates: 49°52′N 20°11′E
- Country: Poland
- Voivodeship: Lesser Poland
- County: Myślenice
- Gmina: Raciechowice

Kwapinka [kfaˈpinka] is a village in the administrative district of Gmina Raciechowice, within Myślenice County, Lesser Poland Voivodeship, in southern Poland.
