= Kostrza =

Kostrza may refer to the following places in Poland:

- Kostrza, Lower Silesian Voivodeship (south-west Poland)
- Kostrza, Lesser Poland Voivodeship (south Poland)
