= Krzeczów, Myślenice County =

Krzeczów
- Village
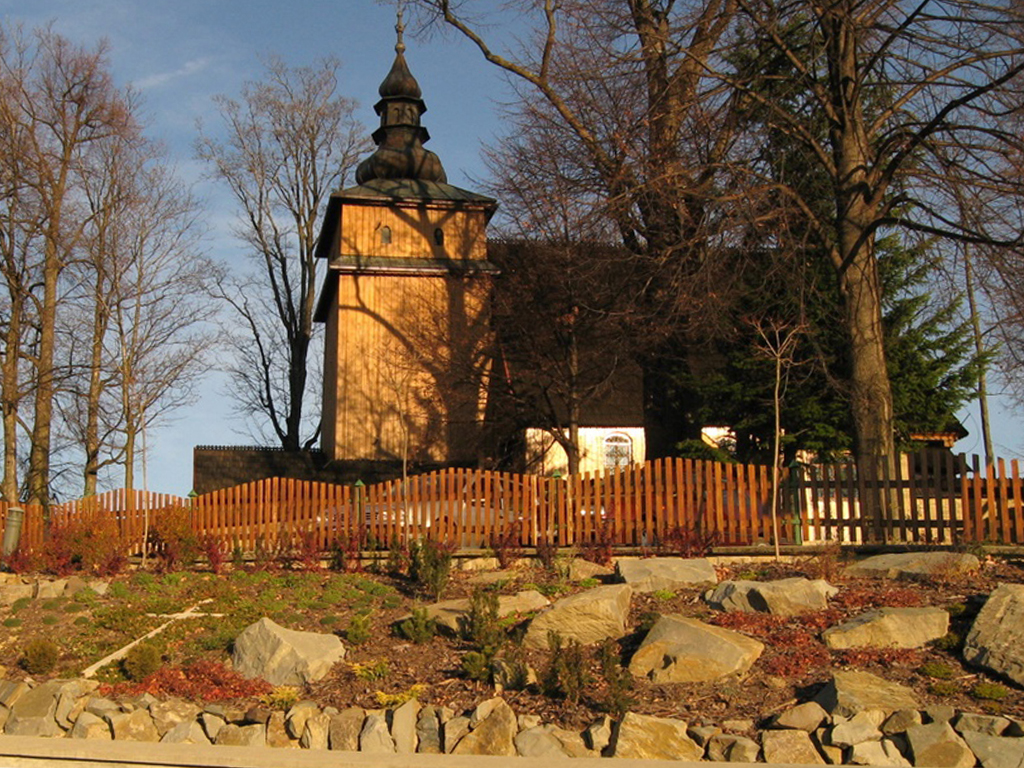
- Church of Saint Adalbert

- Location within Poland
- Coordinates: 49°41′10″N 19°54′30″E
- Country: Poland
- Voivodeship: Lesser Poland
- County: Myślenice
- Gmina: Lubień

Krzeczów [ˈkʂɛt͡ʂuf] is a village in the administrative district of Gmina Lubień, within Myślenice County, Lesser Poland Voivodeship, in southern Poland.
