= Krzywaczka =

- Village
- Location within Poland
- Coordinates: 49°53′N 19°50′E
- Country: Poland
- Voivodeship: Lesser Poland
- County: Myślenice
- Gmina: Sułkowice
- Population (approx.): 1,500
- Website: http://krzywaczka.pl

Krzywaczka [kʂɨˈvat͡ʂka] is a village in the administrative district of Gmina Sułkowice, within Myślenice County, Lesser Poland Voivodeship, in southern Poland.

The village has an approximate population of 1,500.
