= Krzczonów, Lesser Poland Voivodeship =

Krzczonów
- Village
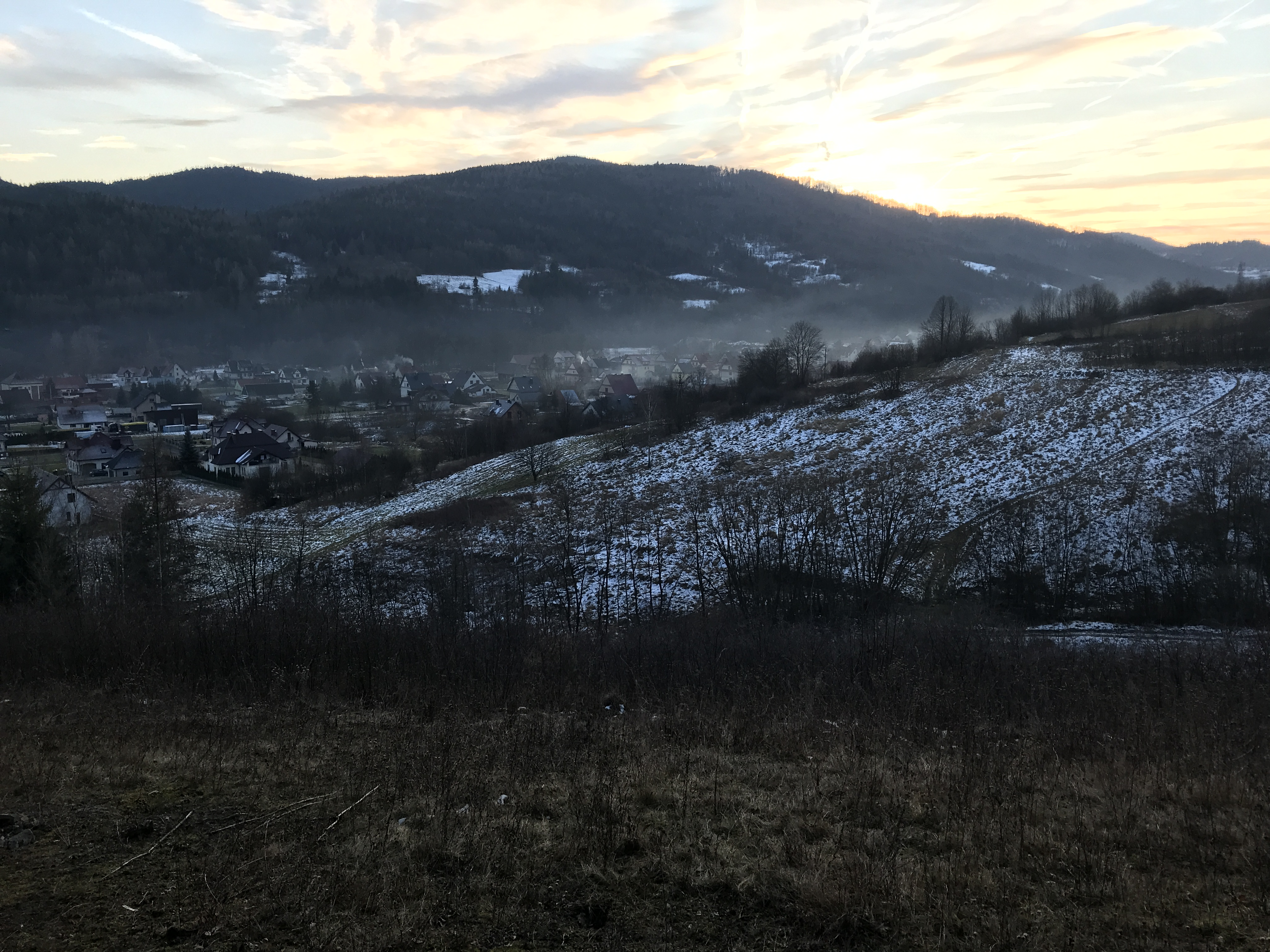
- Krzczonów at sunset

- Location within Poland
- Coordinates: 49°44′N 19°56′E
- Country: Poland
- Voivodeship: Lesser Poland
- County: Myślenice
- Gmina: Tokarnia
- Elevation: 666 m (2,185 ft)

Population
  - Total: 1,900

Krzczonów [ˈkʂt͡ʂɔnuf] is a linear village in the administrative district of Gmina Tokarnia, within Myślenice County, Lesser Poland Voivodeship, in southern Poland.
