= Bojańczyce =

- Village
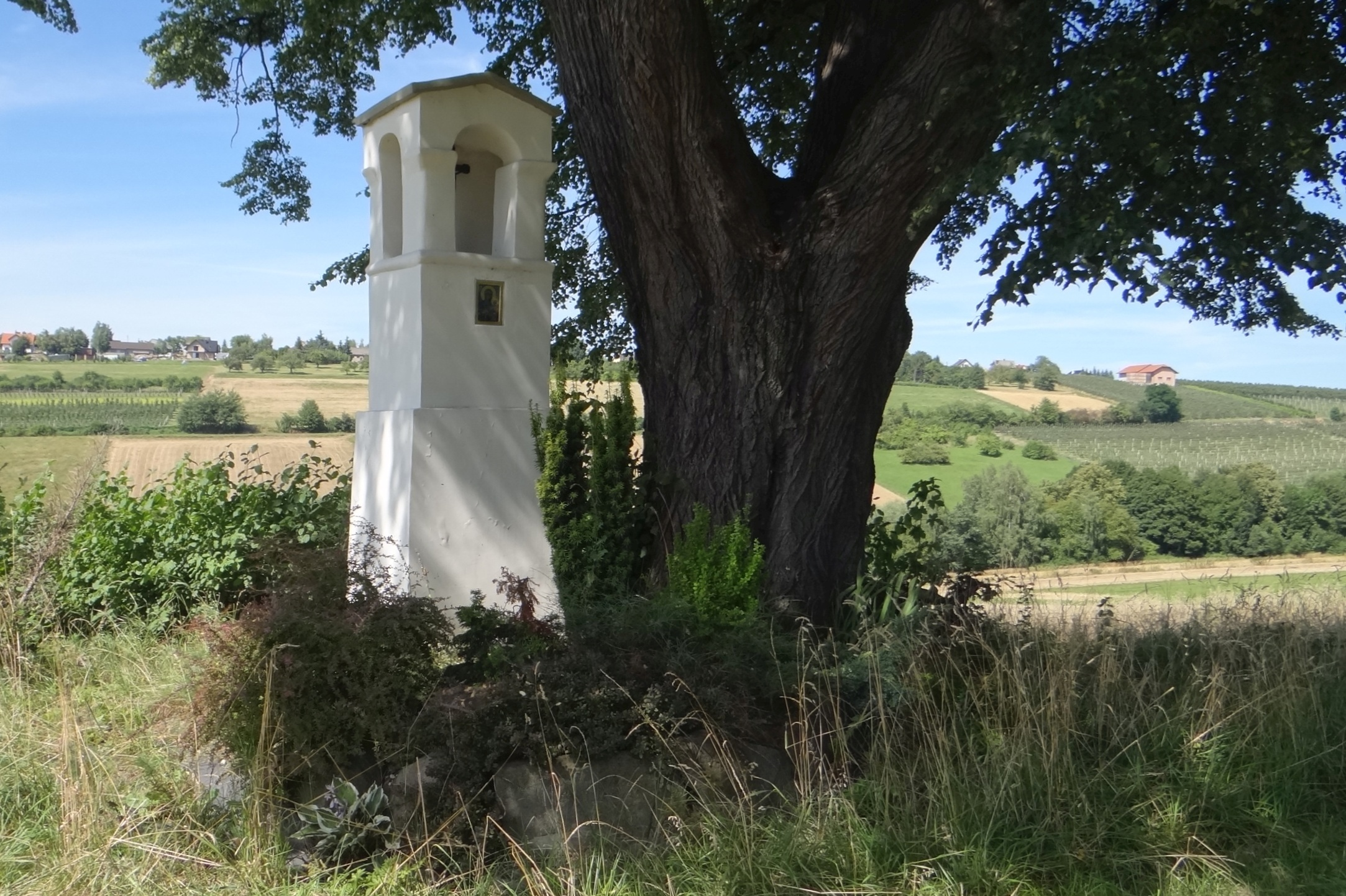
- Chapel

- Location within Poland
- Coordinates: 49°49′N 20°13′E
- Country: Poland
- Voivodeship: Lesser Poland
- County: Myślenice
- Gmina: Raciechowice

Bojańczyce [bɔjaɲˈt͡ʂɨt͡sɛ] is a village in the administrative district of Gmina Raciechowice, within Myślenice County, Lesser Poland Voivodeship, in southern Poland.
