= Gruszów, Myślenice County =

Gruszów
- Village
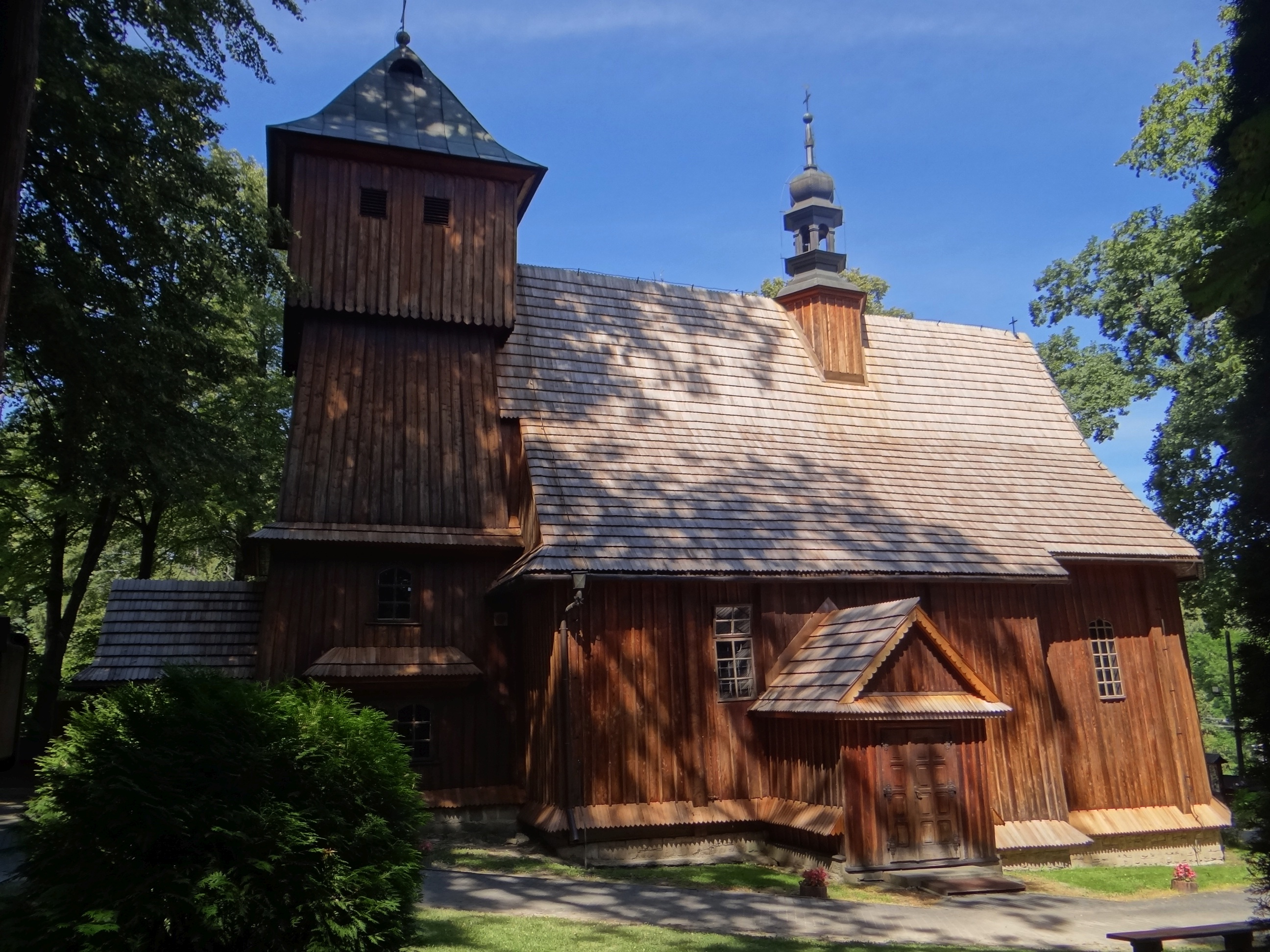
- Church of the Mission of the Saint Apostles

- Location within Poland
- Coordinates: 49°51′N 20°12′E
- Country: Poland
- Voivodeship: Lesser Poland
- County: Myślenice
- Gmina: Raciechowice

Gruszów [ˈɡruʂuf] is a village in the administrative district of Gmina Raciechowice, within Myślenice County, Lesser Poland Voivodeship, in southern Poland.
