= Węglówka, Lesser Poland Voivodeship =

Węglówka
- Village
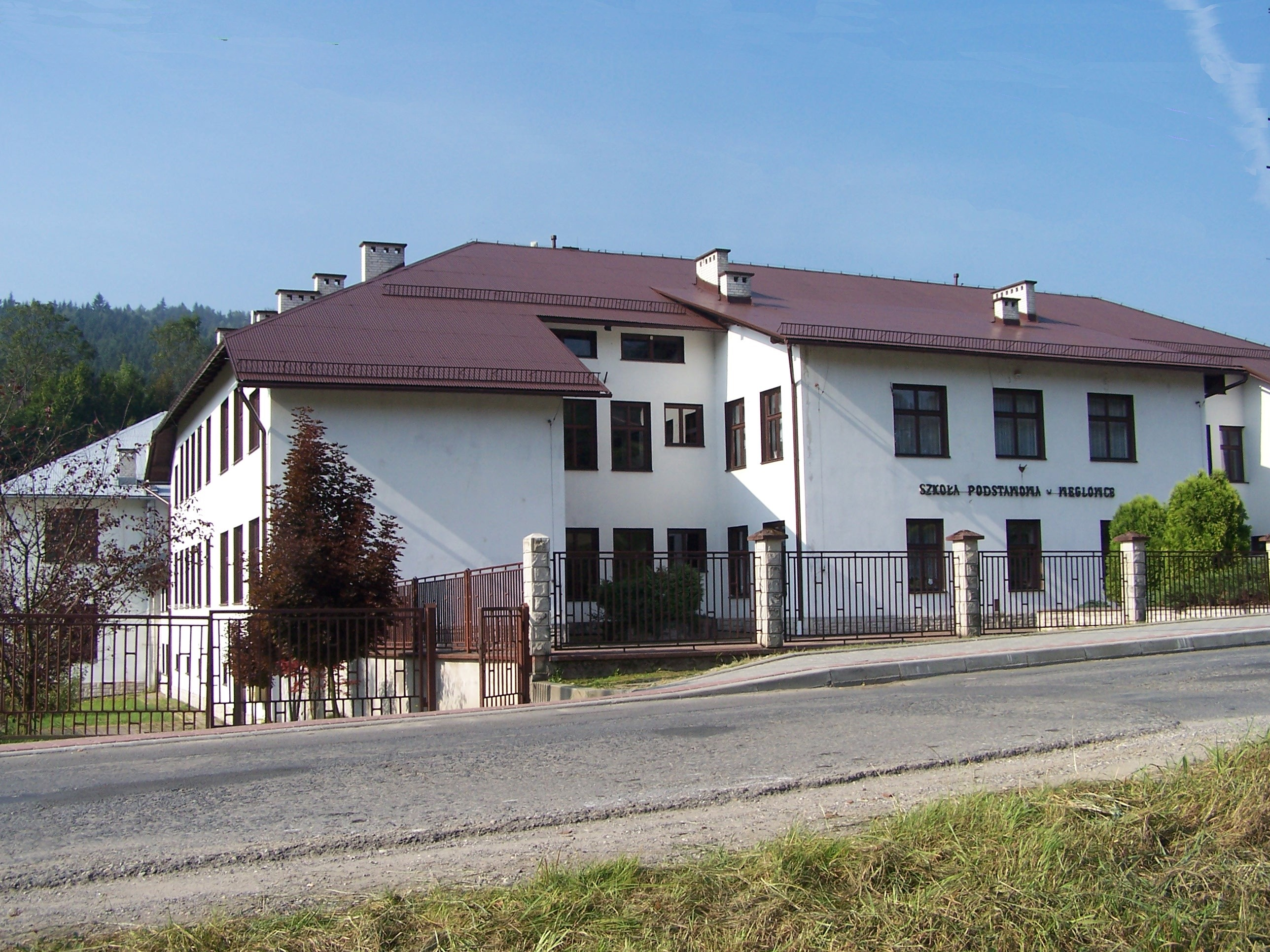
- School

- Location within Poland
- Coordinates: 49°45′N 20°5′E
- Country: Poland
- Voivodeship: Lesser Poland
- County: Myślenice
- Gmina: Wiśniowa

Węglówka [vɛŋˈɡlufka] is a village in the administrative district of Gmina Wiśniowa, within Myślenice County, Lesser Poland Voivodeship, in southern Poland.
