= Tokarnia, Lesser Poland Voivodeship =

Tokarnia
- Village
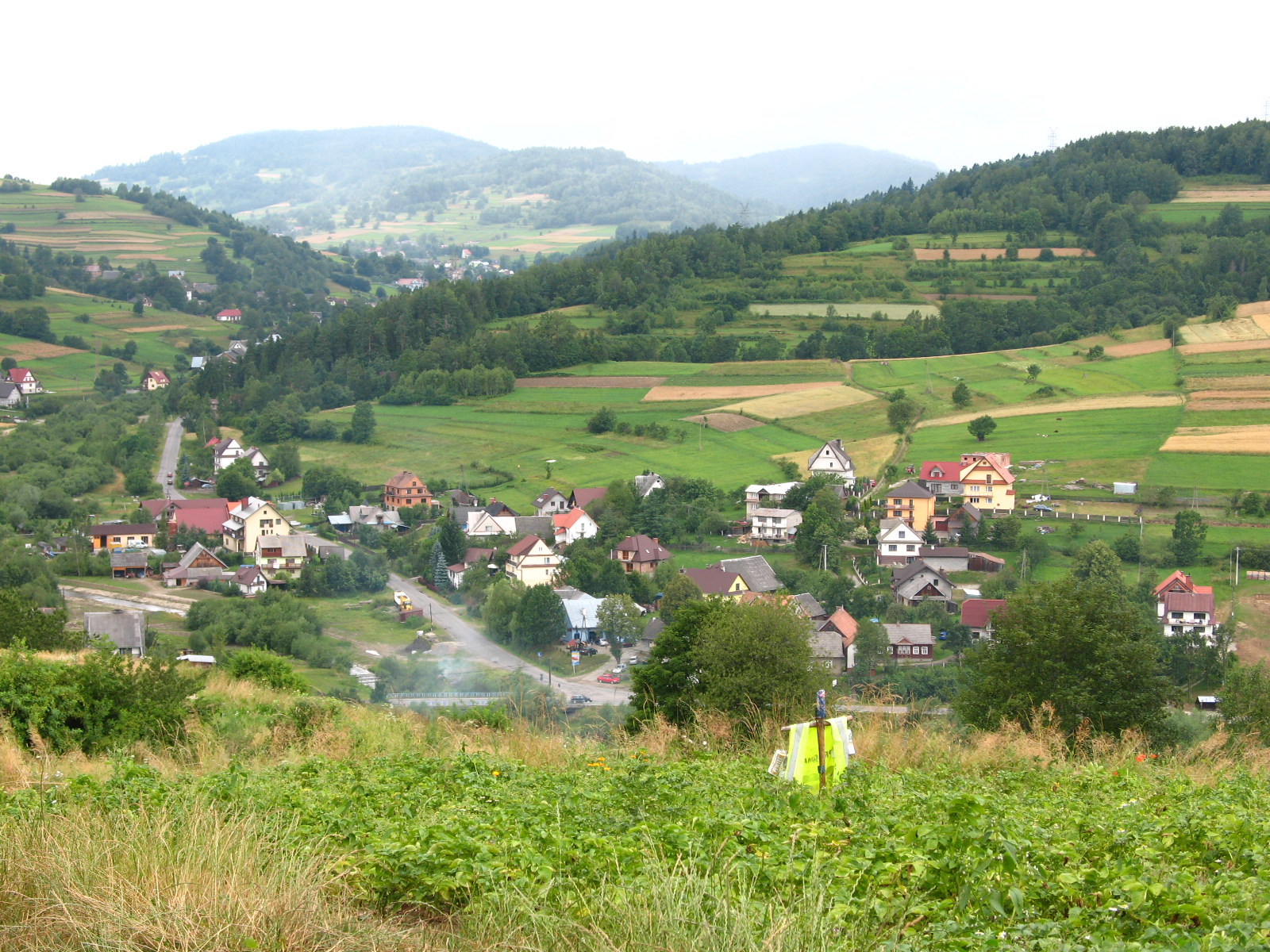
- General view of the village

- Location within Poland
- Coordinates: 49°43′52″N 19°53′1″E
- Country: Poland
- Voivodeship: Lesser Poland
- County: Myślenice
- Gmina: Tokarnia

Population
  - Total: 3,100

Tokarnia [tɔˈkarɲa] is a village in Myślenice County, Lesser Poland Voivodeship, in southern Poland. It is the seat of the gmina (administrative district) called Gmina Tokarnia.
