= Szyk =

- Village
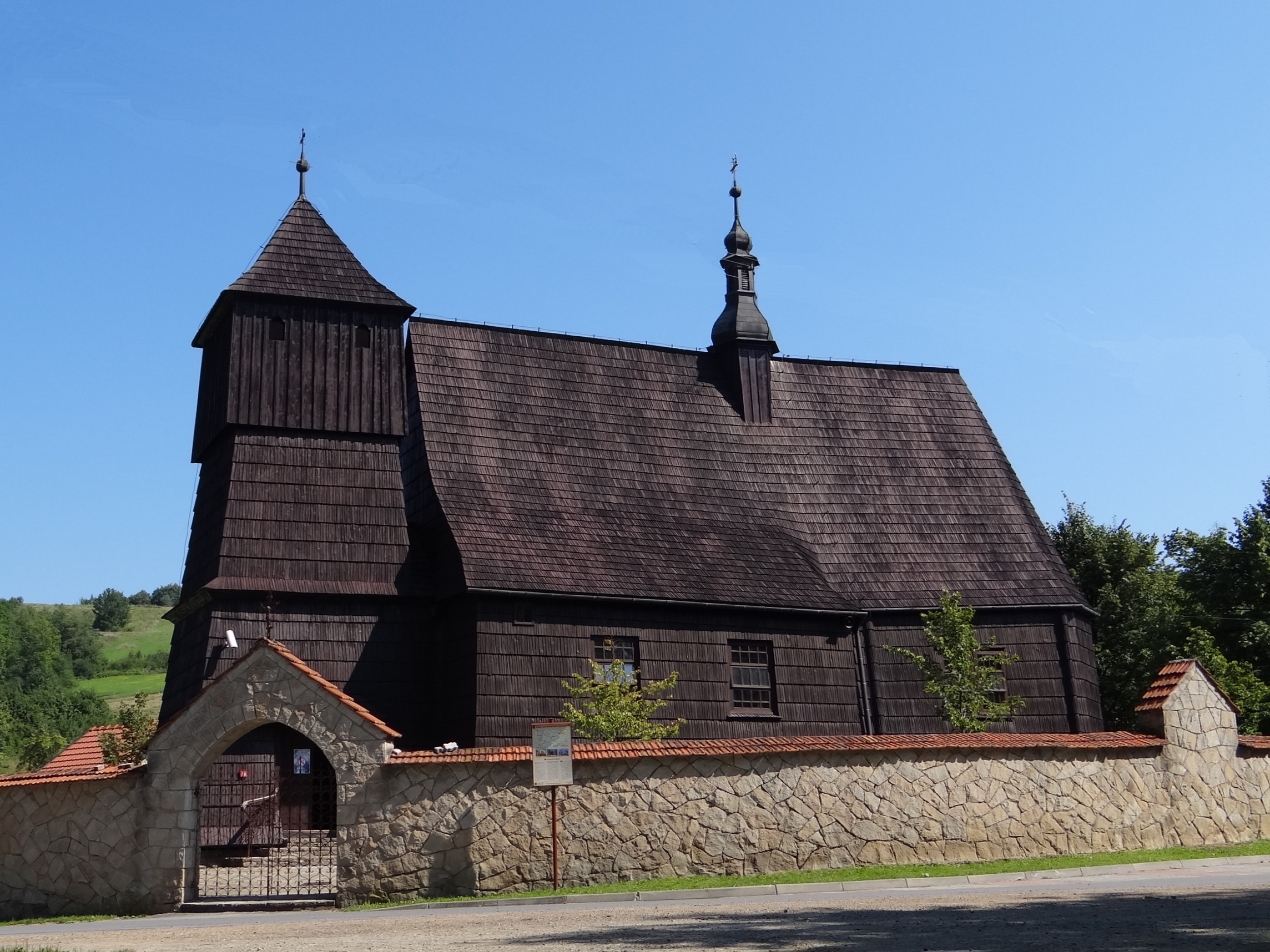
- Church

- Location within Poland
- Coordinates: 49°48′N 20°19′E
- Country: Poland
- Voivodeship: Lesser Poland
- County: Limanowa
- Gmina: Jodłownik

Szyk [ʂɨk] is a village in the administrative district of Gmina Jodłownik, within Limanowa County, Lesser Poland Voivodeship, in southern Poland.
