= Gmina Sułkowice =

Gmina Sułkowice Sułkowice Commune
- Gmina
- Coat of arms
- Interactive map of Gmina Sułkowice
- Coordinates (Sułkowice): 49°50′16″N 19°47′44″E
- Country: Poland
- Voivodeship: Lesser Poland
- County: Myślenice
- Seat: Sułkowice

Area
  - Total: 60.53 km^{2} (23.37 sq mi)

Population (2006)
  - Total: 13,784
  - Density: 227.7/km^{2} (589.8/sq mi)
  - Urban: 6,305
  - Rural: 7,479
- Website: http://www.sulkowice.pl

Gmina Sułkowice is an urban-rural gmina (administrative district) in Myślenice County, Lesser Poland Voivodeship, in southern Poland. Its seat is the town of Sułkowice, which lies approximately 10 kilometres (6 mi) west of Myślenice and 27 km (17 mi) south of the regional capital Kraków.

The gmina covers an area of 60.53 square kilometres (23.4 sq mi), and as of 2006 its total population is 13,784 (out of which the population of Sułkowice amounts to 6,305, and the population of the rural part of the gmina is 7,479).

== Villages ==
Apart from the town of Sułkowice, Gmina Sułkowice contains the villages and settlements of Biertowice, Harbutowice, Krzywaczka and Rudnik.

== Neighbouring gminas ==
Gmina Sułkowice is bordered by the gminas of Budzów, Lanckorona, Myślenice, Pcim and Skawina.
