= Gmina Raciechowice =

Gmina Raciechowice Raciechowice Commune
- Gmina
- Interactive map of Gmina Raciechowice
- Coordinates (Raciechowice): 49°51′N 20°8′E
- Country: Poland
- Voivodeship: Lesser Poland
- County: Myślenice
- Seat: Raciechowice

Area
  - Total: 60.97 km^{2} (23.54 sq mi)

Population (2006)
  - Total: 5,950
  - Density: 97.6/km^{2} (253/sq mi)
- Website: http://www.raciechowice.pl

Gmina Raciechowice is a rural gmina (administrative district) in Myślenice County, Lesser Poland Voivodeship, in southern Poland. Its seat is the village of Raciechowice, which lies approximately 15 kilometres (9 mi) east of Myślenice and 28 km (17 mi) south-east of the regional capital Kraków.

The gmina covers an area of 60.97 square kilometres (23.5 sq mi), and as of 2006 its total population is 5,950.

== Villages ==
Gmina Raciechowice contains the villages and settlements of Bojańczyce, Czasław, Dąbie, Gruszów, Kawec, Komorniki, Krzesławice, Krzyworzeka, Kwapinka, Mierzeń, Poznachowice Górne, Raciechowice, Sawa, Zegartowice and Żerosławice.

== Neighbouring gminas ==
Gmina Raciechowice is bordered by the gminas of Dobczyce, Gdów, Jodłownik, Łapanów and Wiśniowa.
