= Janowice, Limanowa County =

Janowice
- Village
- Location within Poland
- Coordinates: 49°46′56″N 20°12′48″E
- Country: Poland
- Voivodeship: Lesser Poland
- County: Limanowa
- Gmina: Jodłownik

Janowice [janɔˈvit͡sɛ] is a village in the administrative district of Gmina Jodłownik, within Limanowa County, Lesser Poland Voivodeship, in southern Poland.
