= Góra Świętego Jana, Limanowa County =

Góra Świętego Jana
- Village
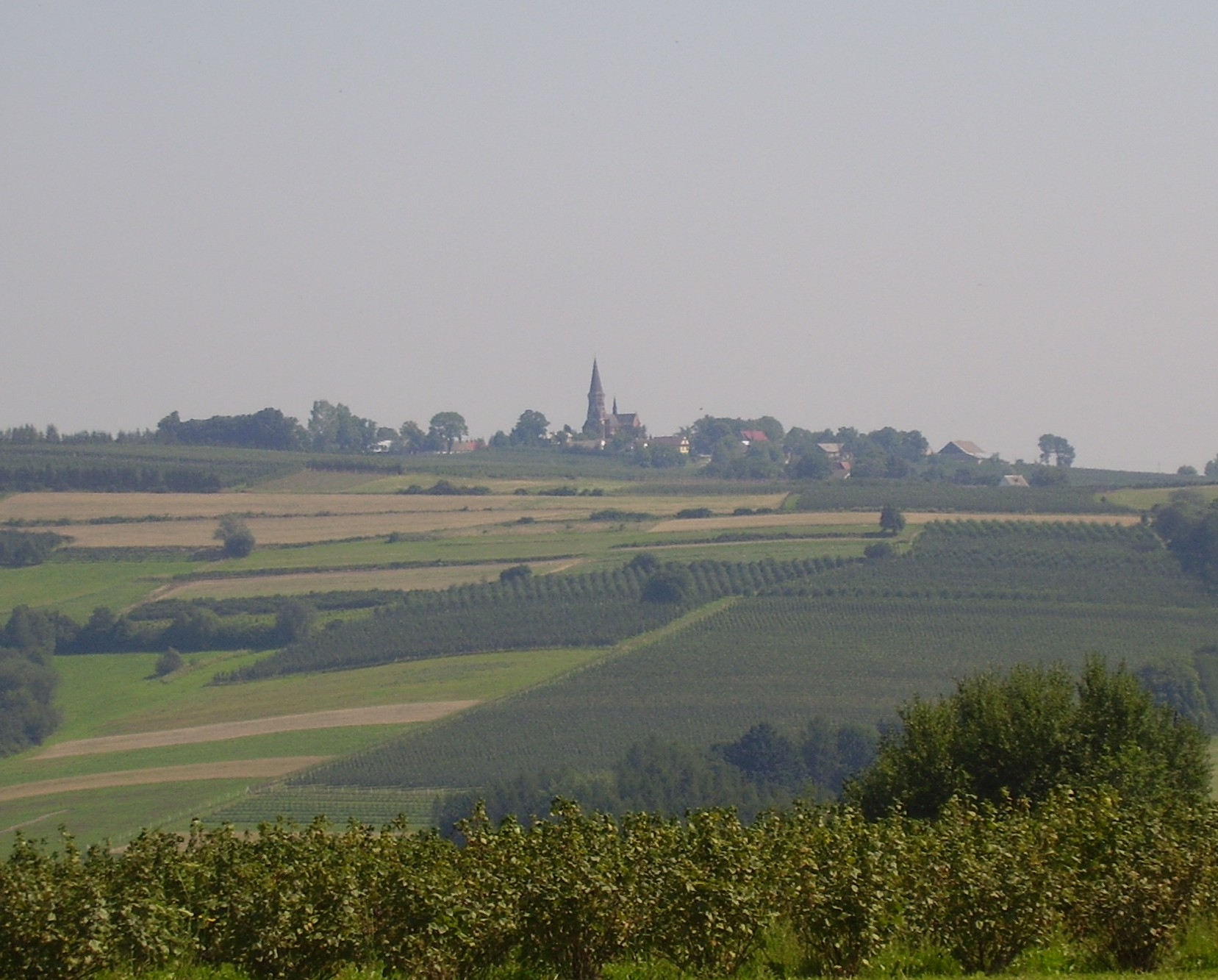
- Góra Świętego Jana

- Location within Poland
- Coordinates: 49°48′10″N 20°11′44″E
- Country: Poland
- Voivodeship: Lesser Poland
- County: Limanowa
- Gmina: Jodłownik
- Elevation: 450 m (1,480 ft)
- Population: 370
- Time zone: UTC+1 (Central European Time)
  - Summer (DST): UTC+2 (Central European Summer Time)

Góra Świętego Jana (Polish: [ˈɡura ɕfjɛnˈtɛɡɔ ˈjana]; "St. John's Mountain") is a village in the administrative district of Gmina Jodłownik, which is within Limanowa County, Lesser Poland Voivodeship, in southern Poland. The closest airport to the village is the Nowy Targ Airport.
