= Gmina Lubień =

Gmina Lubień Lubień Commune
- Gmina
- Flag Coat of arms
- Interactive map of Gmina Lubień
- Coordinates (Lubień): 49°44′N 19°59′E
- Country: Poland
- Voivodeship: Lesser Poland
- County: Myślenice
- Seat: Lubień

Area
  - Total: 75.01 km^{2} (28.96 sq mi)

Population (2006)
  - Total: 9,294
  - Density: 123.9/km^{2} (320.9/sq mi)
- Website: https://www.lubien.pl

Gmina Lubień is a rural gmina (administrative district) in Myślenice County, Lesser Poland Voivodeship, in southern Poland. Its seat is the village of Lubień, which lies approximately 12 kilometres (7 mi) south of Myślenice and 37 km (23 mi) south of the regional capital Kraków.

The gmina covers an area of 75.01 square kilometres (29.0 sq mi), and as of 2006 its total population is 9,294.

== Villages ==
Gmina Lubień contains the villages and settlements of Krzeczów, Lubień, Skomielna Biała and Tenczyn.

== Neighbouring gminas ==
Gmina Lubień is bordered by the gminas of Jordanów, Mszana Dolna, Pcim, Raba Wyżna, Rabka-Zdrój and Tokarnia.
