= Wilkowisko, Lesser Poland Voivodeship =

Wilkowisko, Limanowa
- Village
- Location within Poland
- Coordinates: 49°45′21″N 20°15′21″E
- Country: Poland
- Voivodeship: Lesser Poland
- County: Limanowa
- Gmina: Jodłownik

Wilkowisko, Limanowa [vilkɔˈviskɔ] is a village in the administrative district of Gmina Jodłownik, within Limanowa County, Lesser Poland Voivodeship, in southern Poland.
