= Wiśniowa, Lesser Poland Voivodeship =

Wiśniowa
- Village
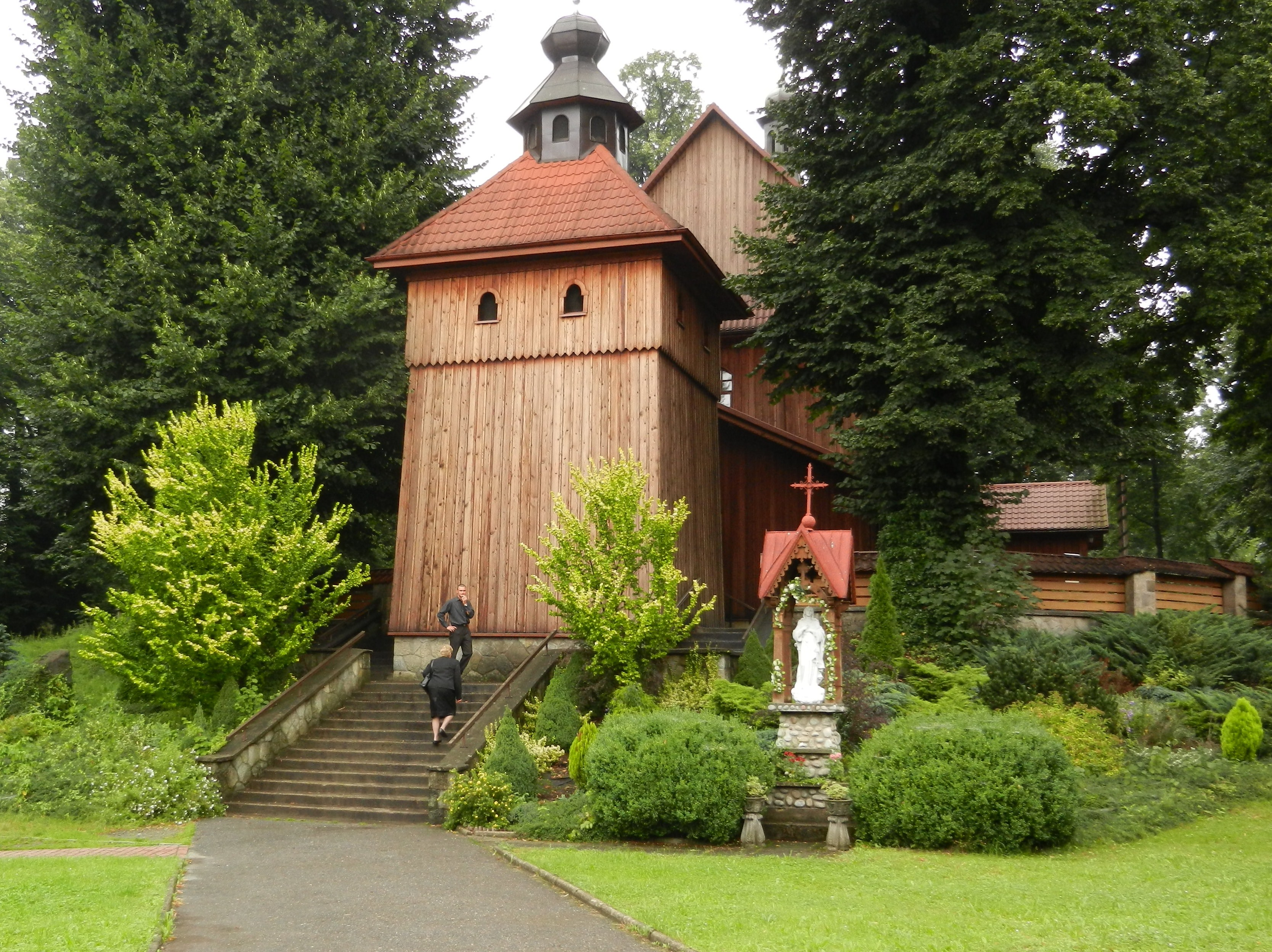
- Saint Martin Church

- Location within Poland
- Coordinates: 49°47′N 20°6′E
- Country: Poland
- Voivodeship: Lesser Poland
- County: Myślenice
- Gmina: Wiśniowa
- Highest elevation: 380 m (1,250 ft)
- Lowest elevation: 320 m (1,050 ft)
- Population: 1,900

Wiśniowa [viɕˈɲɔva] is a village in Myślenice County, Lesser Poland Voivodeship, in southern Poland. It is the seat of the gmina (administrative district) called Gmina Wiśniowa.
