= Gmina Tokarnia =

Gmina Tokarnia Tokarnia Commune
- Gmina
- Coat of arms
- Interactive map of Gmina Tokarnia
- Coordinates (Tokarnia): 49°43′52″N 19°53′1″E
- Country: Poland
- Voivodeship: Lesser Poland
- County: Myślenice
- Seat: Tokarnia

Area
  - Total: 68.85 km^{2} (26.58 sq mi)

Population (2006)
  - Total: 8,072
  - Density: 117.2/km^{2} (303.7/sq mi)
- Website: http://tokarnia.ug.pl

Gmina Tokarnia is a rural gmina (administrative district) in Myślenice County, Lesser Poland Voivodeship, in southern Poland. Its seat is the village of Tokarnia, which lies approximately 12 kilometres (7 mi) south of Myślenice and 37 km (23 mi) south of the regional capital Kraków.

The gmina covers an area of 68.85 square kilometres (26.6 sq mi), and as of 2006 its total population is 8,072.

== Villages ==
Gmina Tokarnia contains the villages and settlements of Bogdanówka, Krzczonów, Skomielna Czarna, Tokarnia, Więciórka and Zawadka.

== Neighbouring gminas ==
Gmina Tokarnia is bordered by the gminas of Budzów, Jordanów, Lubień, Maków Podhalański and Pcim.
