= Krasne-Lasocice =

- Village
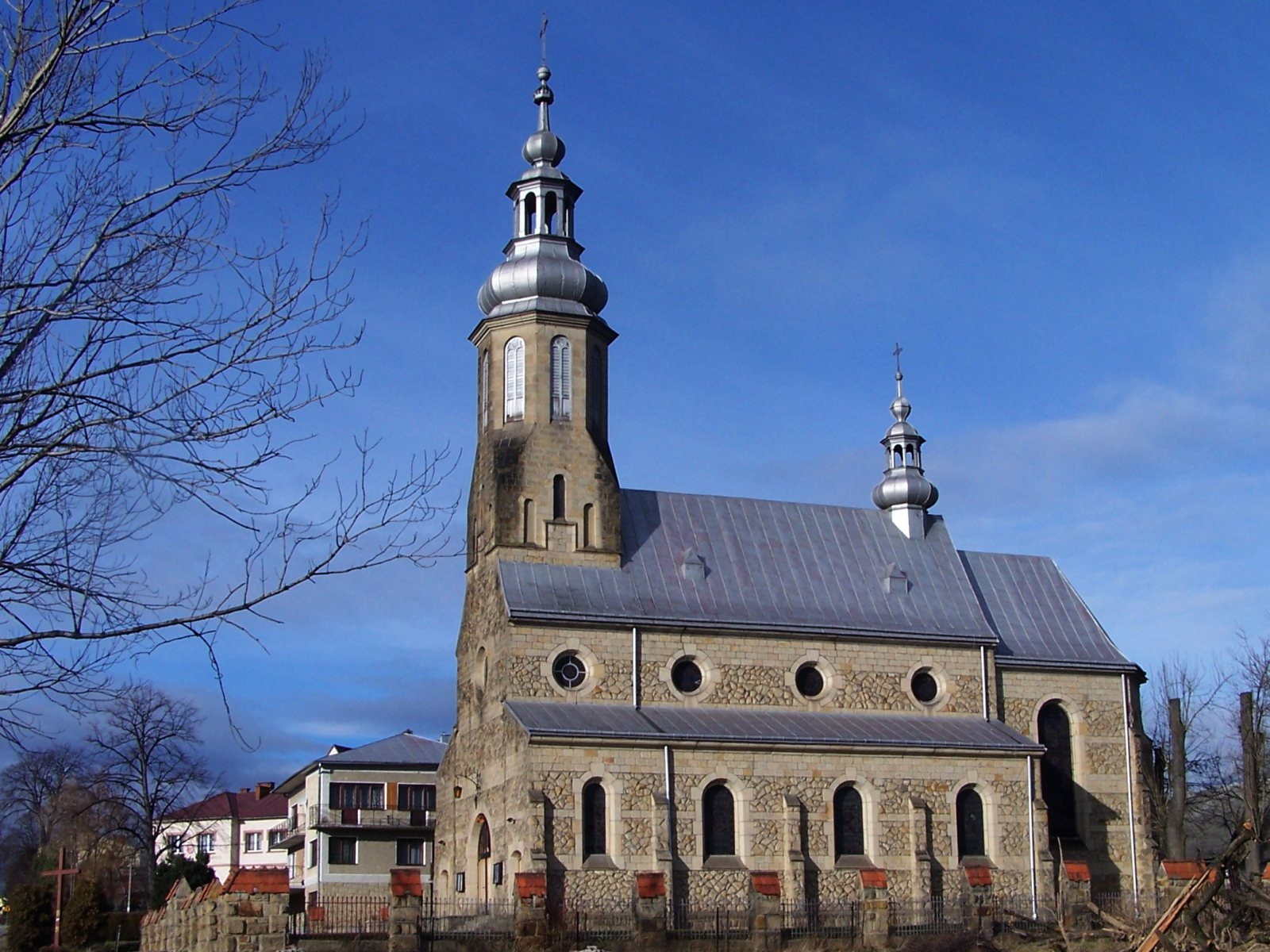
- Church

- Location within Poland
- Coordinates: 49°48′45″N 20°13′40″E
- Country: Poland
- Voivodeship: Lesser Poland
- County: Limanowa
- Gmina: Jodłownik
- Population: 640

Krasne-Lasocice [ˈkrasnɛ lasɔˈt͡ɕit͡sɛ] is a village in the administrative district of Gmina Jodłownik, within Limanowa County, Lesser Poland Voivodeship, in southern Poland.
