= Słupia, Lesser Poland Voivodeship =

Słupia
- Village
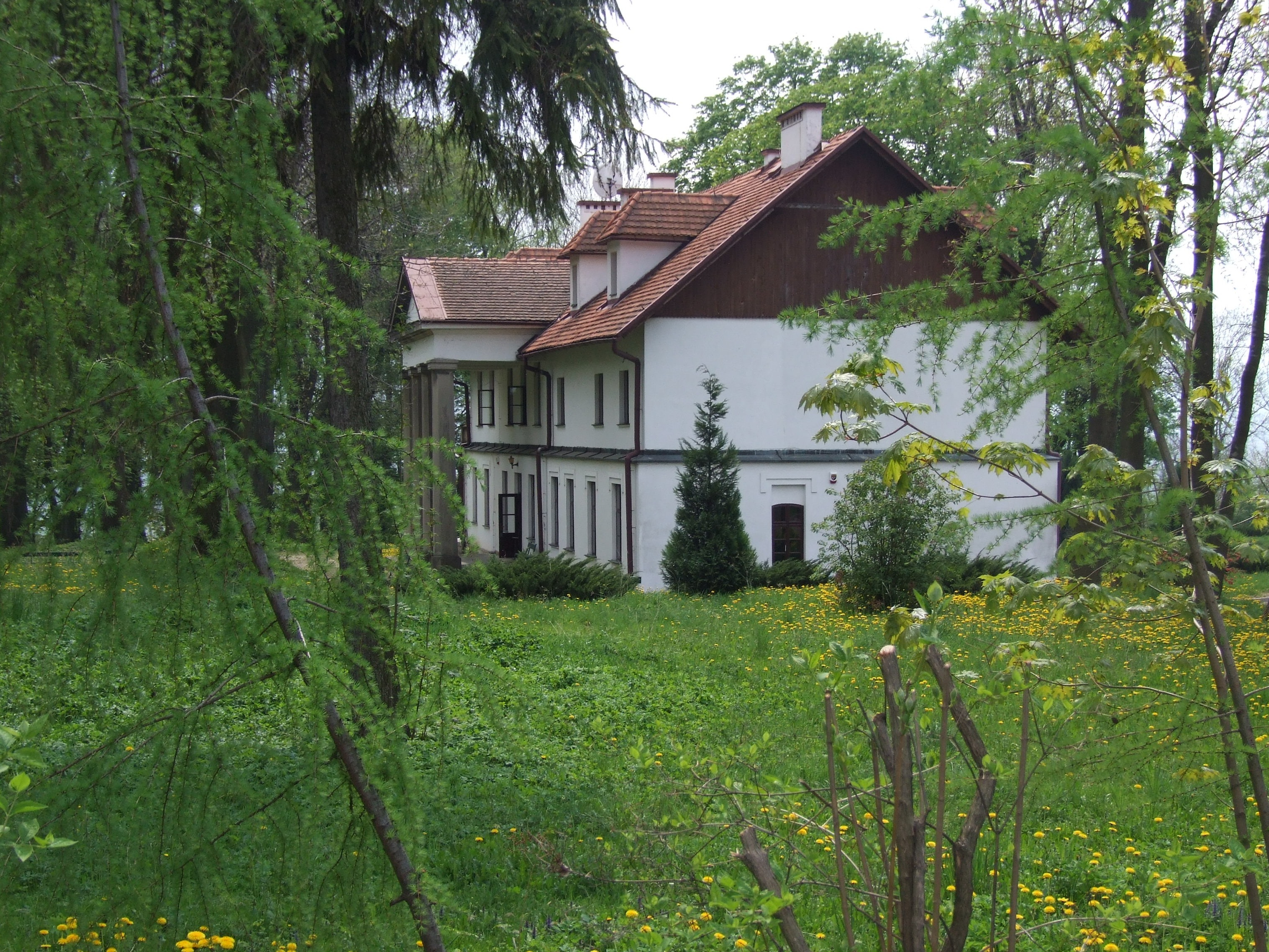
- Manor house

- Location within Poland
- Coordinates: 49°48′41″N 20°15′31″E
- Country: Poland
- Voivodeship: Lesser Poland
- County: Limanowa
- Gmina: Jodłownik

Słupia [ˈswupja] is a village in the administrative district of Gmina Jodłownik, within Limanowa County, Lesser Poland Voivodeship, in southern Poland.
