= Sułkowice =

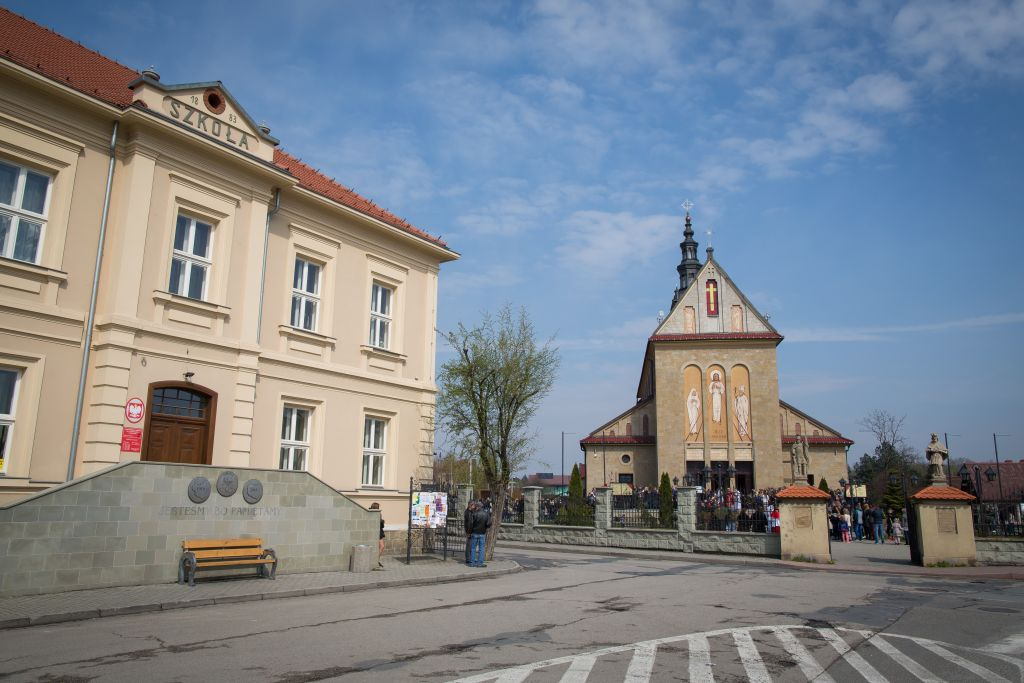
- Town square in Sułkowice

- Flag Coat of arms

- Location within Poland
- Coordinates: 49°50′16″N 19°47′44″E
- Country: Poland
- Voivodeship: Lesser Poland
- County: Myślenice
- Gmina: Sułkowice

Area
  - Total: 16.46 km^{2} (6.36 sq mi)

Population (2006)
  - Total: 6,305
  - Density: 383.0/km^{2} (992.1/sq mi)
- Postal code: 32-440
- Website: http://www.sulkowice.pl

Sułkowice [suu̯kɔˈvʲit͡sɛ] is a town in southern Poland, situated in the Lesser Poland Voivodeship (since 1999), previously in Kraków Voivodeship (1975–1998).

== Sport ==
- Meble-Rys Gościbia Sułkowice - women's handball team
