= Raciechowice =

- Village
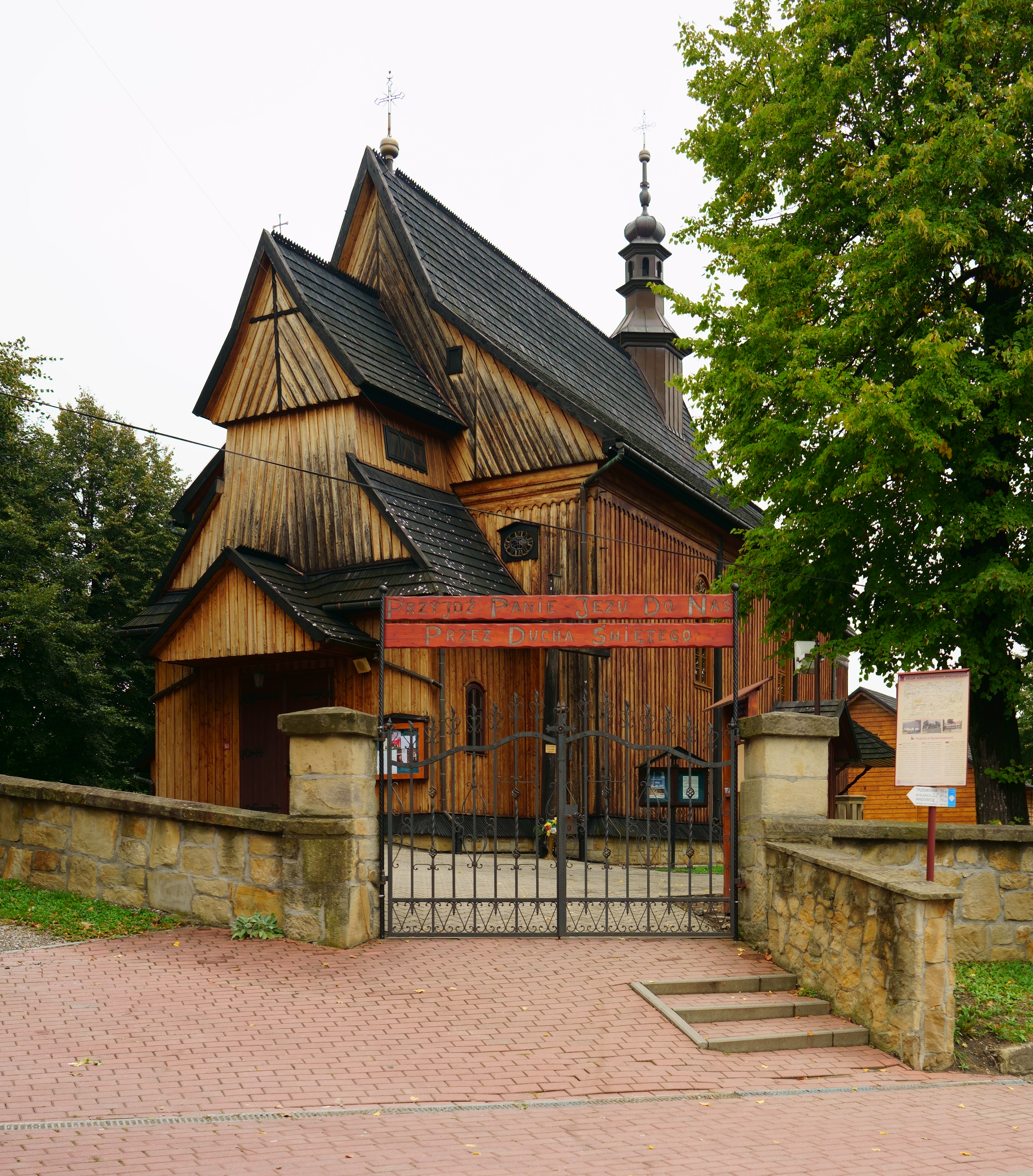
- Saint Jacob the Apostle Church

- Location within Poland
- Coordinates: 49°51′N 20°8′E
- Country: Poland
- Voivodeship: Lesser Poland
- County: Myślenice
- Gmina: Raciechowice
- Time zone: UTC+1 (CET)
  - Summer (DST): UTC+2 (CEST)
- Postal code: 32-415
- Vehicle registration: KMY
- Website: http://www.raciechowice.pl/pl/

Raciechowice [rat͡ɕɛxɔˈvit͡sɛ] is a village in Myślenice County, Lesser Poland Voivodeship, in southern Poland. It is the seat of the gmina (administrative district) called Gmina Raciechowice.

== History ==
Following the German-Soviet invasion of Poland, which started World War II in September 1939, the village was occupied by Germany until 1945. A local police policeman was murdered by the Russians in the Katyn massacre in 1940.
