= Gmina Jodłownik =

Gmina Jodłownik Jodłownik Commune
- Gmina
- Flag Coat of arms
- Interactive map of Gmina Jodłownik
- Coordinates (Jodłownik): 49°46′24″N 20°14′2″E
- Country: Poland
- Voivodeship: Lesser Poland
- County: Limanowa
- Seat: Jodłownik

Area
  - Total: 72.43 km^{2} (27.97 sq mi)

Population (2006)
  - Total: 8,050
  - Density: 111/km^{2} (288/sq mi)
- Website: http://www.jodlownik.iap.pl/

Gmina Jodłownik is a rural gmina (administrative district) in Limanowa County, Lesser Poland Voivodeship, in southern Poland. Its seat is the village of Jodłownik, which lies approximately 17 kilometres (11 mi) north-west of Limanowa and 39 km (24 mi) south-east of the regional capital Kraków.

The gmina covers an area of 72.43 square kilometres (28.0 sq mi), and as of 2006 its total population is 8,050.

== Villages ==
Gmina Jodłownik contains the villages and settlements of Góra Świętego Jana, Janowice, Jodłownik, Kostrza, Krasne-Lasocice, Mstów, Pogorzany, Sadek, Słupia, Szczyrzyc, Szyk and Wilkowisko.

== Neighbouring gminas ==
Gmina Jodłownik is bordered by the gminas of Dobra, Łapanów, Limanowa, Raciechowice, Tymbark and Wiśniowa.
