= Harbutowice, Lesser Poland Voivodeship =

Harbutowice
- Village
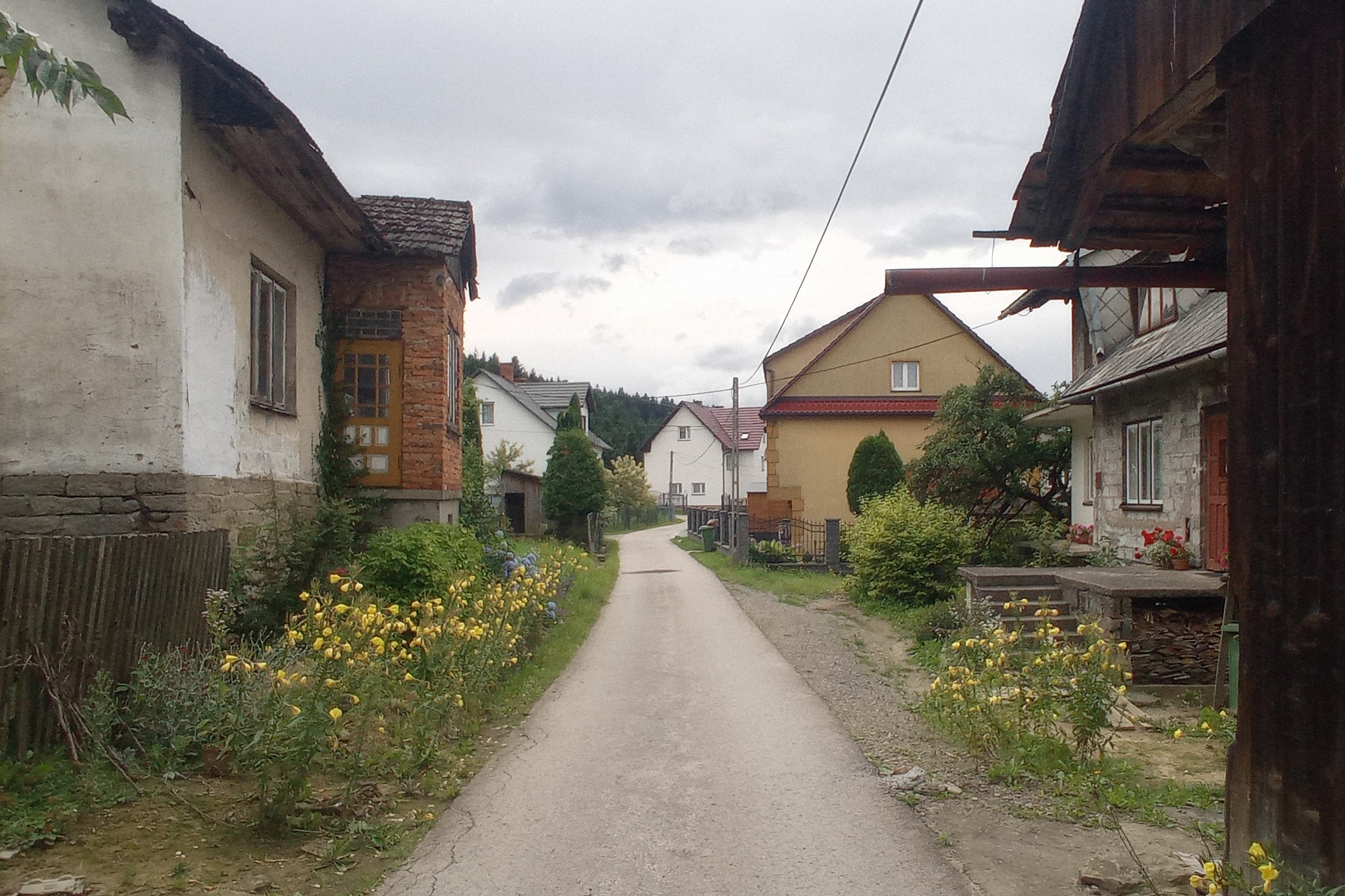

- Location within Poland
- Coordinates: 49°49′N 19°47′E
- Country: Poland
- Voivodeship: Lesser Poland
- County: Myślenice
- Gmina: Sułkowice

Harbutowice [xarbutɔˈvʲit͡sɛ] is a village in the administrative district of Gmina Sułkowice, within Myślenice County, Lesser Poland Voivodeship, in southern Poland.
