= Sadek, Lesser Poland Voivodeship =

Sadek
- Village
- Location within Poland
- Coordinates: 49°47′40″N 20°15′54″E
- Country: Poland
- Voivodeship: Lesser Poland
- County: Limanowa
- Gmina: Jodłownik

Sadek [ˈsadɛk] is a village in the administrative district of Gmina Jodłownik, within Limanowa County, Lesser Poland Voivodeship, in southern Poland.
