= Pogorzany =

- Village
- Location within Poland
- Coordinates: 49°47′6″N 20°10′49″E
- Country: Poland
- Voivodeship: Lesser Poland
- County: Limanowa
- Gmina: Jodłownik

Pogorzany [pɔɡɔˈʐanɨ] is a village in the administrative district of Gmina Jodłownik, within Limanowa County, Lesser Poland Voivodeship, in southern Poland.
