= Lubień, Lesser Poland Voivodeship =

Lubień
- Village
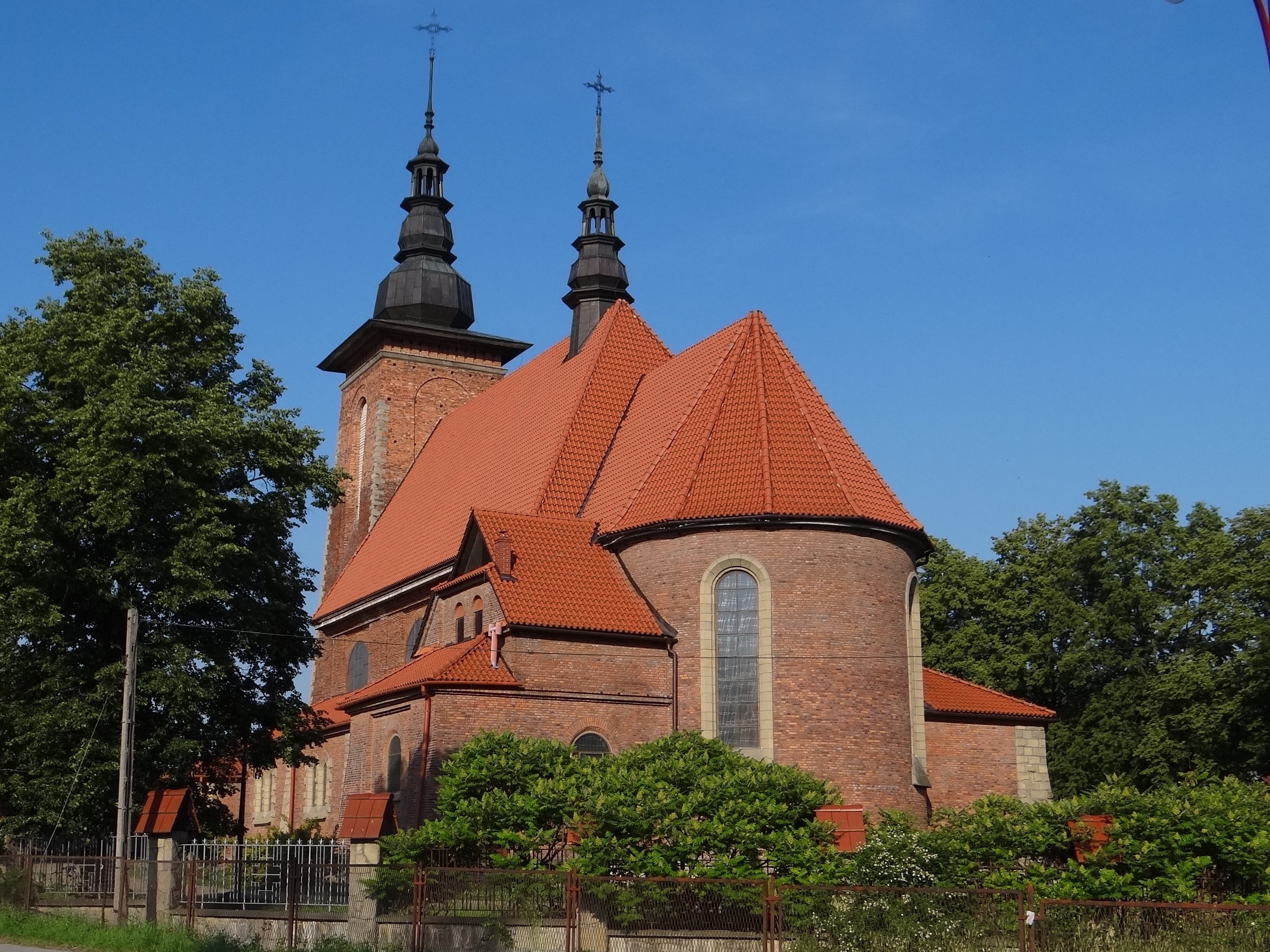
- Church of Saint John the Baptist

- Location within Poland
- Coordinates: 49°44′N 19°59′E
- Country: Poland
- Voivodeship: Lesser Poland
- County: Myślenice
- Gmina: Lubień

Population
  - Total: 3,200

Lubień (Polish pronunciation: [ˈlubjɛj̃]) is a village in Myślenice County, Lesser Poland Voivodeship, in southern Poland. It is the seat of the gmina (administrative district) called Gmina Lubień.
