= Kostrza, Lesser Poland Voivodeship =

Kostrza
- Village
- Location within Poland
- Coordinates: 49°46′39″N 20°16′30″E
- Country: Poland
- Voivodeship: Lesser Poland
- County: Limanowa
- Gmina: Jodłownik

Kostrza [ˈkɔstʂa] is a village in the administrative district of Gmina Jodłownik, within Limanowa County, Lesser Poland Voivodeship, in southern Poland.
