= Mstów, Lesser Poland Voivodeship =

Mstów
- Village
- Location within Poland
- Coordinates: 49°47′29″N 20°14′26″E
- Country: Poland
- Voivodeship: Silesian
- County: Limanowa
- Gmina: Jodłownik
- Postal code: 34-620

Mstów [mstuf] is a village in the administrative district of Gmina Jodłownik, within Limanowa County, Lesser Poland Voivodeship, in southern Poland.
