= Jodłownik, Lesser Poland Voivodeship =

Jodłownik
- Village
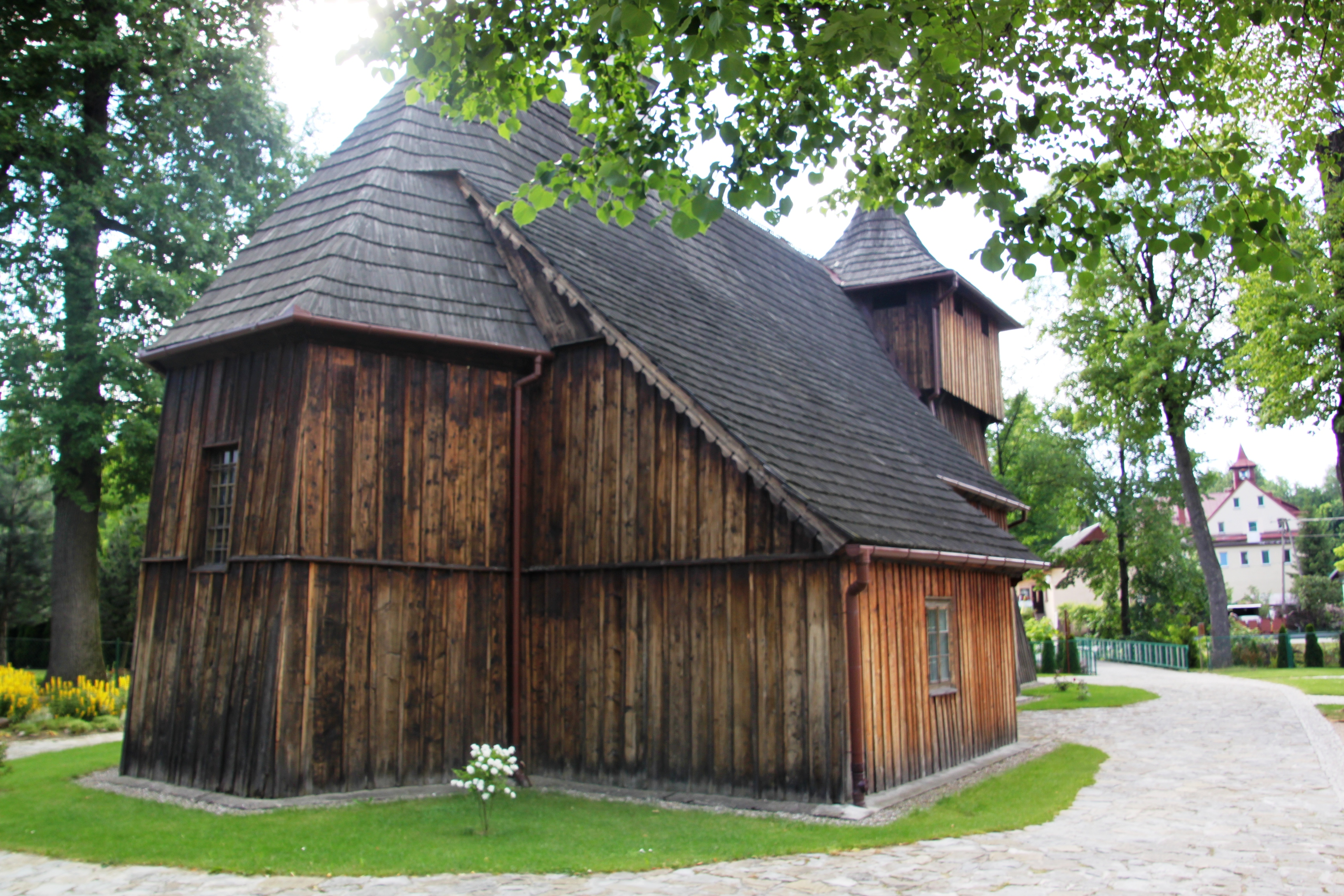
- Church of the Nativity of the Virgin Mary

- Location within Poland
- Coordinates: 49°46′24″N 20°14′2″E
- Country: Poland
- Voivodeship: Lesser Poland
- County: Limanowa
- Gmina: Jodłownik

Jodłownik [jɔdˈwɔvnik] is a village in Limanowa County, Lesser Poland Voivodeship, in southern Poland. It is the seat of the gmina (administrative district) called Gmina Jodłownik.
