= Gmina Wiśniowa, Lesser Poland Voivodeship =

Gmina Wiśniowa Wiśniowa Commune
- Gmina
- Flag Coat of arms
- Interactive map of Gmina Wiśniowa
- Coordinates (Wiśniowa): 49°47′N 20°6′E
- Country: Poland
- Voivodeship: Lesser Poland
- County: Myślenice
- Seat: Wiśniowa

Area
  - Total: 67.06 km^{2} (25.89 sq mi)

Population (2006)
  - Total: 6,833
  - Density: 101.9/km^{2} (263.9/sq mi)
- Website: http://www.ug-wisniowa.pl/

Gmina Wiśniowa is a rural gmina (administrative district) in Myślenice County, Lesser Poland Voivodeship, in southern Poland. Its seat is the village of Wiśniowa, which lies approximately 14 kilometres (9 mi) south-east of Myślenice and 33 km (21 mi) south of the regional capital Kraków.

The gmina covers an area of 67.06 square kilometres (25.9 sq mi), and as of 2006 its total population is 6,833.

== Villages ==
Gmina Wiśniowa contains the villages and settlements of Glichów, Kobielnik, Lipnik, Poznachowice Dolne, Węglówka, Wierzbanowa and Wiśniowa.

== Neighbouring gminas ==
Gmina Wiśniowa is bordered by the gminas of Dobczyce, Dobra, Jodłownik, Mszana Dolna, Myślenice, Pcim and Raciechowice.
