= Myślenice County =

Myślenice County Powiat myślenicki
- County
- Flag Coat of arms

- Location within the voivodeship
- Coordinates (Myślenice): 49°50′N 19°56′E
- Country: Poland
- Voivodeship: Lesser Poland
- Seat: Myślenice
- Gminas: Total 9: Gmina Dobczyce; Gmina Lubień; Gmina Myślenice; Gmina Pcim; Gmina Raciechowice; Gmina Siepraw; Gmina Sułkowice; Gmina Tokarnia; Gmina Wiśniowa

Area
  - Total: 673.3 km^{2} (260.0 sq mi)

Population (2006)
  - Total: 116,793
  - Density: 173.5/km^{2} (449.3/sq mi)
  - Urban: 30,403
  - Rural: 86,390
- Car plates: KMY
- Website: www.powiat-myslenice.pl

Myślenice County (Polish: powiat myślenicki) is a unit of territorial administration and local government (powiat) in Lesser Poland Voivodeship, southern Poland. It came into being on January 1, 1999, as a result of the Polish local government reforms passed in 1998. Its administrative seat and largest town is Myślenice, which lies 26 kilometres (16 mi) south of the regional capital Kraków. The county also contains the towns of Sułkowice, lying 10 km (6 mi) west of Myślenice, and Dobczyce, 15 km (9 mi) north-east of Myślenice.

The county covers an area of 673.3 square kilometres (260.0 sq mi). As of 2006 its total population is 116,793, out of which the population of Myślenice is 18,070, that of Sułkowice is 6,305, that of Dobczyce is 6,028, and the rural population is 86,390.

== Neighbouring counties ==
Myślenice County is bordered by Kraków County and Wieliczka County to the north, Bochnia County and Limanowa County to the east, Nowy Targ County to the south, and Sucha County and Wadowice County to the west.

== Administrative division ==
The county is subdivided into nine gminas (three urban-rural and six rural). These are listed in the following table, in descending order of population.

Gmina	Type	Area (km²)	Population (2006)	Seat
Gmina Myślenice	urban-rural	153.7	40,783	Myślenice
Gmina Dobczyce	urban-rural	66.6	13,941	Dobczyce
Gmina Sułkowice	urban-rural	60.5	13,784	Sułkowice
Gmina Pcim	rural	88.6	10,327	Pcim
Gmina Lubień	rural	75.0	9,294	Lubień
Gmina Tokarnia	rural	68.9	8,072	Tokarnia
Gmina Siepraw	rural	31.9	7,809	Siepraw
Gmina Wiśniowa	rural	67.1	6,833	Wiśniowa
Gmina Raciechowice	rural	61.0	5,950	Raciechowice
