= Stanisław Moskal =

Polish scientist and writer

Stanisław Moskal Śledź Otrembus Podgrobelski
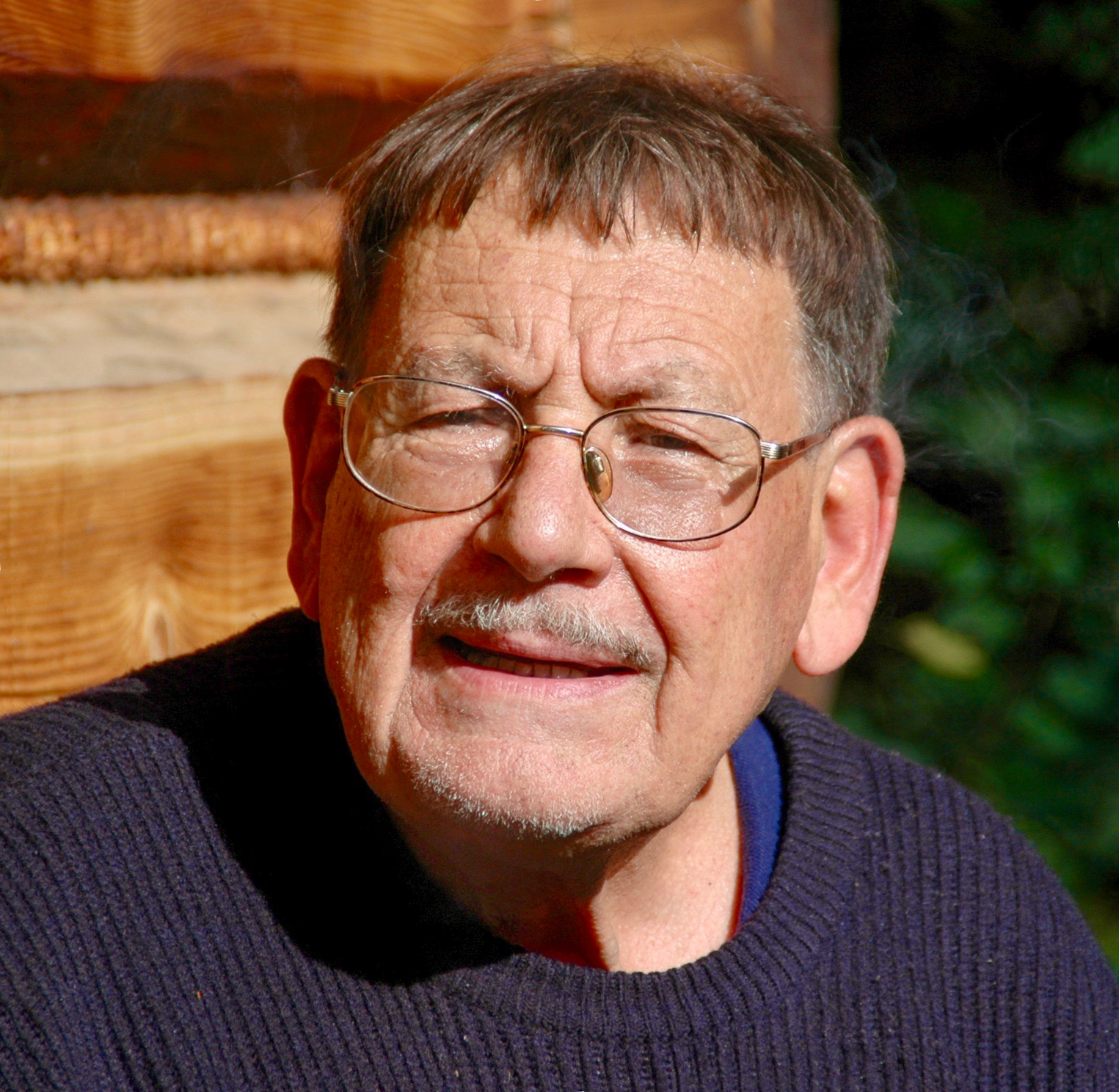
- Stanisław "Śledź" Moskal (2009)
- Born: March 4, 1935; Kraków
- Died: May 8, 2019 (aged 84); Kraków
- Education: Agricultural University of Kraków zootechnics Jagiellonian University sociology
- Awards: Cross of Merit
- Scientific career
- Fields: agricultural science
- Thesis: (1970)

Autograph
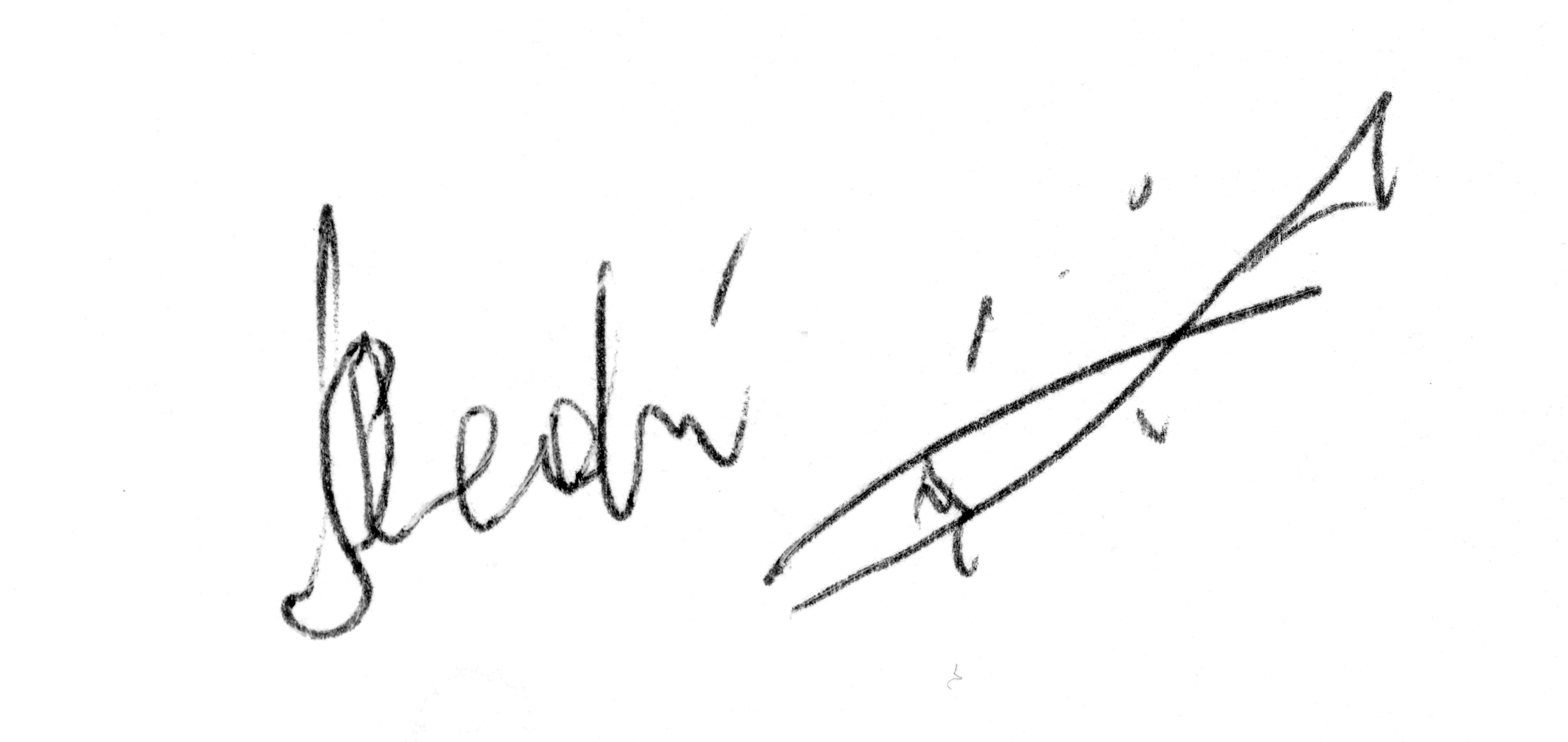

Stanisław Józef Moskal, alias Śledź Otrembus Podgrobelski (born 4 March 1935 in Kraków, died there on 8 May 2019) was a Polish scientist and writer, a rural sociologist, a professor of agricultural science, associated with the Agricultural University of Kraków. He researched cultural transformations and determinants of development in Polish villages, particularly the ecological awareness of its inhabitants. He was knowledgeable about the local subdialects of Podhale. A lover of mountains, ethnologist, and traveler. For many years, he studied the determinants of agricultural development in Algeria.

He authored Introduction to imaginescopy in the form of a satirical treatise, the fictitious methodology and stylization of which were used by readers in various practical and theoretical applications. He created the character Jeremiasz Apollon Hytz, to whom he attributed many theses related to imaginescopy. The book, first published in 1977, became the subject of numerous literary, logological, and philosophical analyses, as well as a famous topic for many blogs. The concept of imaginescopy proved to be an inspiration for numerous and innovative artistic experiments. Interest in it has particularly developed in the 21st century.

The author's professional experience as a scientist and sociologist is reflected in the humorous scientific text, which is compared to the works of leading representatives of similar prose genres. The author wrote under the pseudonym "Śledź Otrembus Podgrobelski". In 2012, he also published a volume of his own memoirs.

== Early life ==
He was the son of Stanisław (1903–1984) and Jadwiga née Jordan (1908–1964). His father was an engineer and technical director of a chemical factory producing soap and vegetable fats in Trzebinia. His mother was a teacher and came from the historical family of former salt Żupniks of Wieliczka, whose members distinguished themselves in the November uprising and the Hungarian Revolution. (Note: Major Spytko Jordan was the first commander of the Kraków 10th Infantry Regiment, established in January 1831 by the Polish Temporary Government during the November Uprising. Major Władysław Jordan was an officer in General Józef Bem's Polish Legion during the Hungarian Revolution in 1849.)

He was born in Kraków. He was strongly connected to his family's (on his father's side) village of Sułkowice near the Beskids and its traditions, where he experienced the German occupation. He graduated from high school in 1952 at one of the oldest Polish schools (established in 1588) – Bartłomiej Nowodworski High School, whose graduates included his grandfather and uncle.

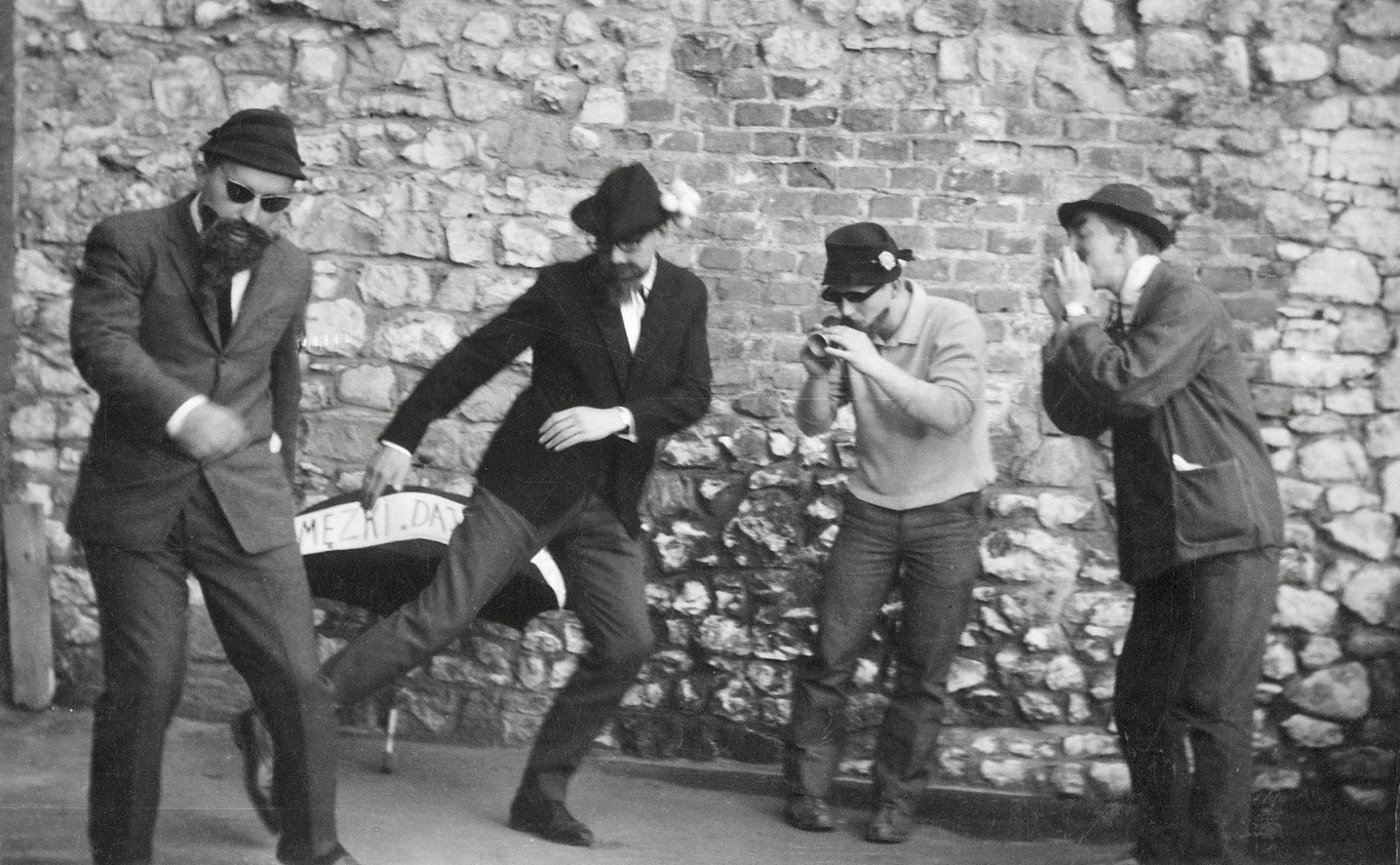
Stanisław Moskal (second from left) during the 1964 Kraków Juwenalia

He completed his studies in zootechnics (1957) at the Agricultural University of Kraków, and then studied sociology (1965) at the Jagiellonian University. From 1960, he worked at the Agricultural University of Kraków as an assistant, and from 1965 as a senior assistant in the Department (from 1970, Institute) of Agricultural Economics and Organization. In 1970, based on his dissertation Non-agricultural work as a factor of change in the farm and peasant family of Podhale, he obtained a doctorate in agricultural sciences and was employed as an assistant professor. In 1978, he obtained his habilitation based on the work Dual-occupation population in the process of socio-economic rural development.

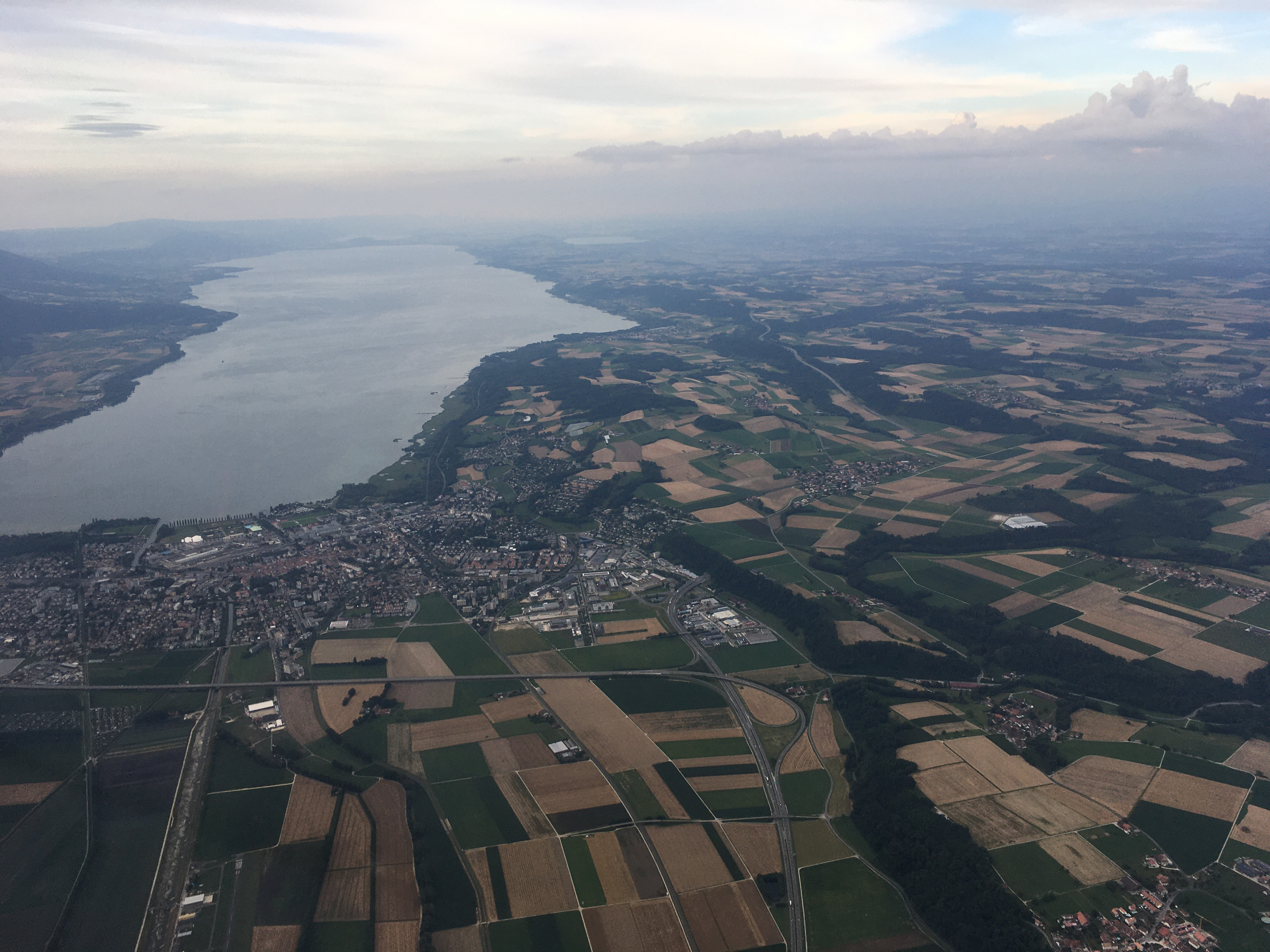
The agricultural village of Belmont-sur-Yverdon, in the lower right corner, 5 km from the town of Yverdon-les-Bains and Lake Neuchâtel in Switzerland

In the late 1950s and early 1960s, he spent a year working on a farm in the small town of Belmont-sur-Yverdon in the French-speaking canton of Vaud in Switzerland, thanks to which he gained significant experience working and living in Swiss society compared to the economic and social conditions in Poland at that time. In 1971, he visited Siberia during a scientific internship in Novosibirsk. During the academic year 1973/1974, he spent a research scholarship in Algeria. In 1975, he visited the surroundings of Uzhhorod in Carpathian Ruthenia. From 1976 to 1979, he was an economic consultant at the Institute of Animal Science in Balice.

He returned to Algeria from 1979 to 1986 and worked at the Higher Agricultural School (now ENSA) in El Harrach on the outskirts of Algiers. There, he lectured on economic development issues, agricultural economics, and prepared a detailed feed balance sheet for Algeria on behalf of the Ministry of Agriculture. He also conducted numerous field trips, including into the Sahara desert.

At the same time, from 1979, he was employed at the Agricultural University of Kraków as a docent in the Department of Agricultural Policy, and from 1994 as an associate professor at the Department of Sociology and Rural Development. In 1989, he was awarded the Golden Cross of Merit.

In 1992, he participated in a study visit at Université Laval in Canada. He received the title of professor of agricultural sciences in 2000. From 1994 to 2004, he was the head of the newly established Department of Sociology and Rural Development at the university. He retired in 2007. (Note: The Agricultural and Forestry Departments of the Jagiellonian University served as the basis for the establishment of the Higher Agricultural School of Kraków in 1953, which was renamed the Agricultural University (named after Hugo Kołłątaj) in 1972 and then granted university status as the Hugo Kołłątaj University of Agriculture in Kraków in 2008. Therefore, Stanisław Moskal was a retired professor of the University of Agriculture ("Historia Uczelni". Uniwersytet Rolniczy im. Hugona Kołłątaja w Krakowie.).)

He died on 8 May 2019 in Kraków, and was buried at Rakowicki Cemetery (section P, row 2, grave 18).

== Scientific work ==
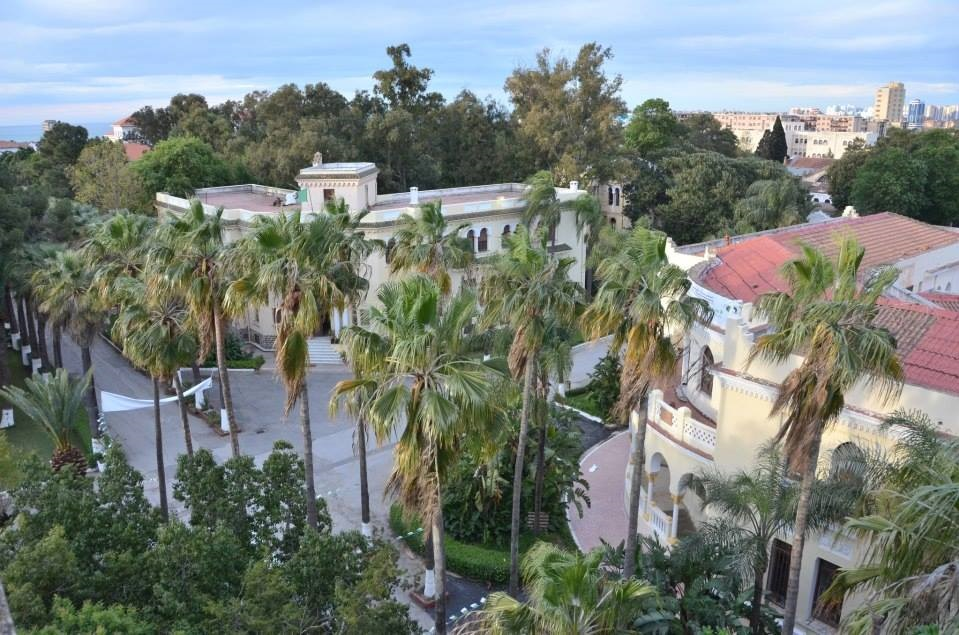
ENSA – agricultural university in El Harrach near Algiers

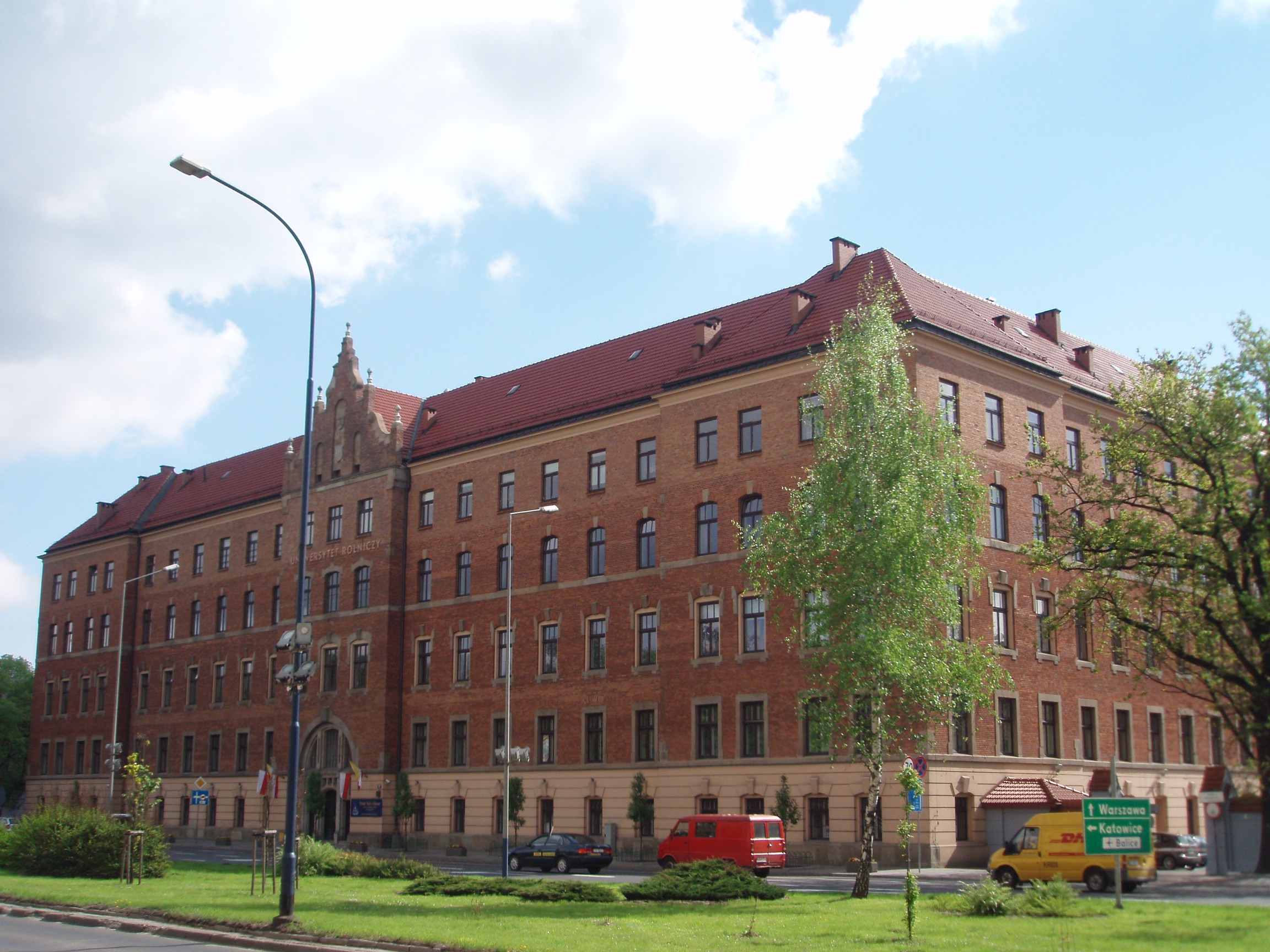
Agricultural University of Kraków, Emil Godlewski Collegium

His scientific output comprises over 220 interdisciplinary works, bridging the fields of rural sociology and agricultural economics. The topics of his works include issues related to the transformation of agriculture in the process of economic development, changes in the socio-economic structure of the population, the functioning of peasant farms, labor resources in rural areas, as well as cultural and civilizational aspects of rural development, including the ecological awareness of its inhabitants.

He authored a frequently reissued academic textbook on rural sociology and two monographs analyzing non-agricultural work in peasant families in the Podhale region. The first monograph, which served as his doctoral thesis, examined the challenging living and working conditions of peasant workers in the 1970s in the fragmented agricultural farms in the villages of Gronie and Ostrowsko in the Podhale region, who worked in a shoe factory in Nowy Targ. He also authored monographic studies on the situation of rural youth in Poland and on agriculture in Algeria. He collaborated with universities in Rennes, Paris, and Montpellier, as well as in Nitra and Prešov.

He studied cultural changes in Polish villages, particularly the regional phenomenon of dual employment in rural areas and rural overpopulation. He noted that despite the visible civilizational progress in rural areas at the beginning of the 21st century and household equipment comparable to urban areas, a large part of rural youth – unlike their parents' generation – critically assesses the countryside as a place to live and expresses professional aspirations associated with urban and non-agricultural sectors of the economy. Rural youth consider their own non-agricultural business as the optimal solution.

He developed a program for the development of agricultural areas and analyzed initiatives undertaken by urban-rural and rural municipalities to activate local communities and direct economic transformations in rural areas in the situation of fragmented rural farms. He particularly studied the psychological determinants of the reconstruction of villages in Lesser Poland. Based on survey research conducted in 2000 in the voivodeships of Lesser Poland and Subcarpathia, he proposed solutions for creating alternative job opportunities to agriculture.

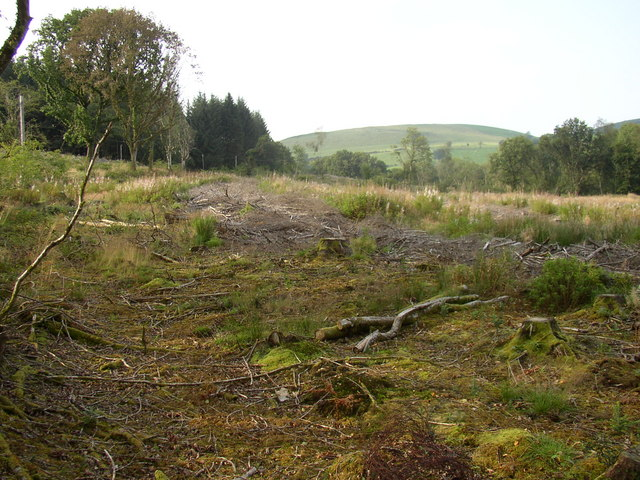
Tree felling and associated environmental degradation was a concern for villagers in Lesser Poland in the late 20th century

He introduced quantitative methods for studying the ecological awareness of rural residents. He demonstrated that at the end of the 20th century, two-thirds of respondents in Lesser Poland perceived environmental degradation in rural areas mainly due to deforestation, wild landfills, progressive land development, and unattractive architecture. His literary works reflect his knowledge of the folklore of southern Poland's foothills.

He served as an advisor to agricultural state and local government institutions. He was a member of the board of the Lesser Poland Rural Development Program and the team for Agricultural Unemployment in Kraków, and participated in training programs of the Lesser Poland Association of Agricultural Advisory Services. He consulted study trips and seminars to France and Ukraine for the Rural Areas Renewal Association Wieś i Europa from 2000 to 2002. He criticized the system of direct payments granted to Polish farmers by the European Union.

Since 1997, he was a member of the editorial board of Krakowskie Studia Małopolskie and since 2002 of the quarterly journal of the Polish Academy of Sciences Wieś i Rolnictwo. He supervised three doctoral dissertations in Algeria and three in Poland, the last of which was conducted at the Institute for Rural Development and Agriculture of the Polish Academy of Sciences in 2005.

In the characterization of social-economic representatives in Kraków in 2015, he was considered a "significant figure" in this community and was described as "focused on science, with a very solid methodological scientific background, and rather avoiding popularity without direct reference to science".

== Literary works ==
=== Introduction to imaginescopy ===
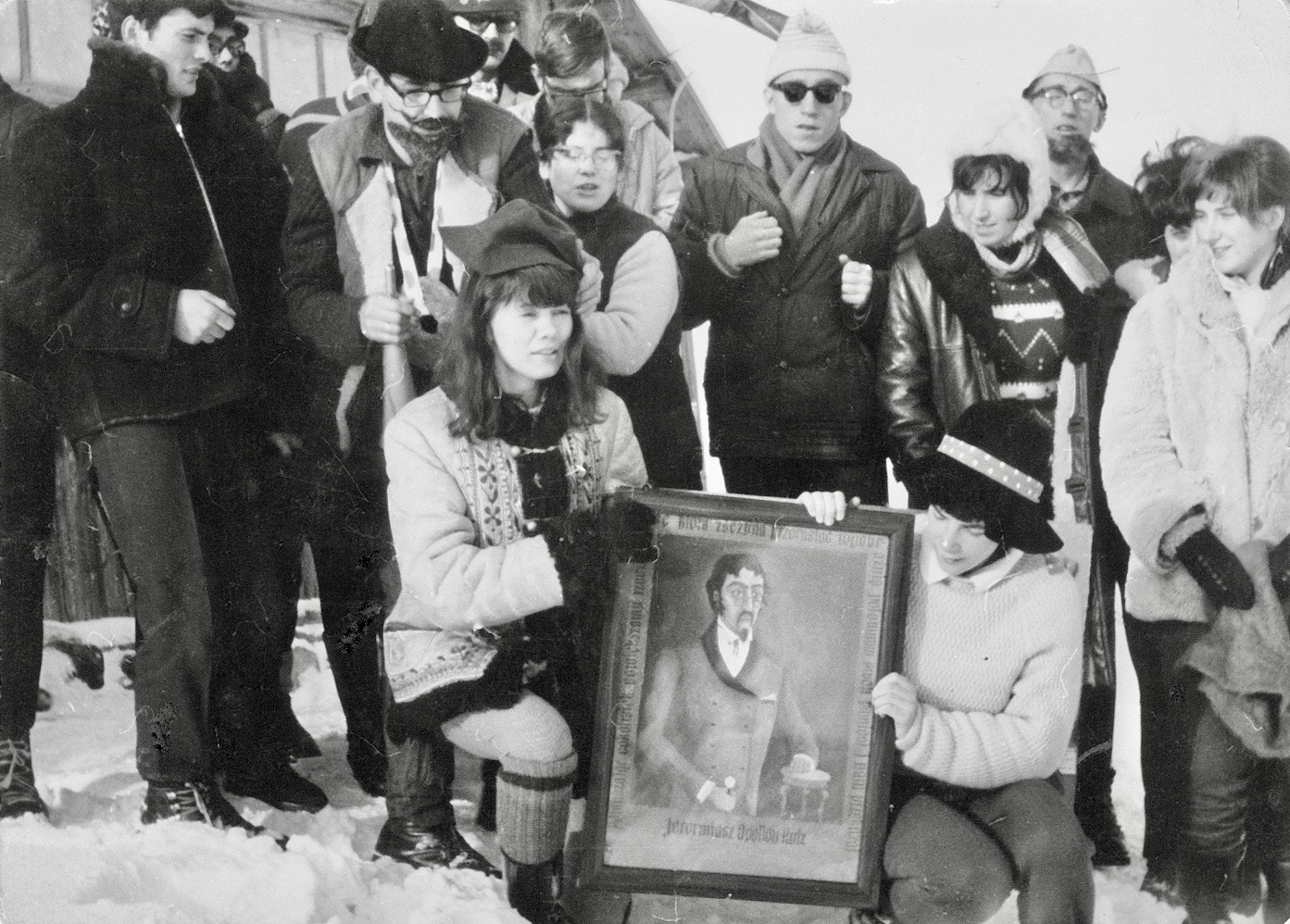
Portrait of Jeremiasz Apollon Hytz in front of the Bethlehem mountain hut on Hala Gąsienicowa in the Tatra Mountains. Stanisław Moskal stands third from the left – January 1968

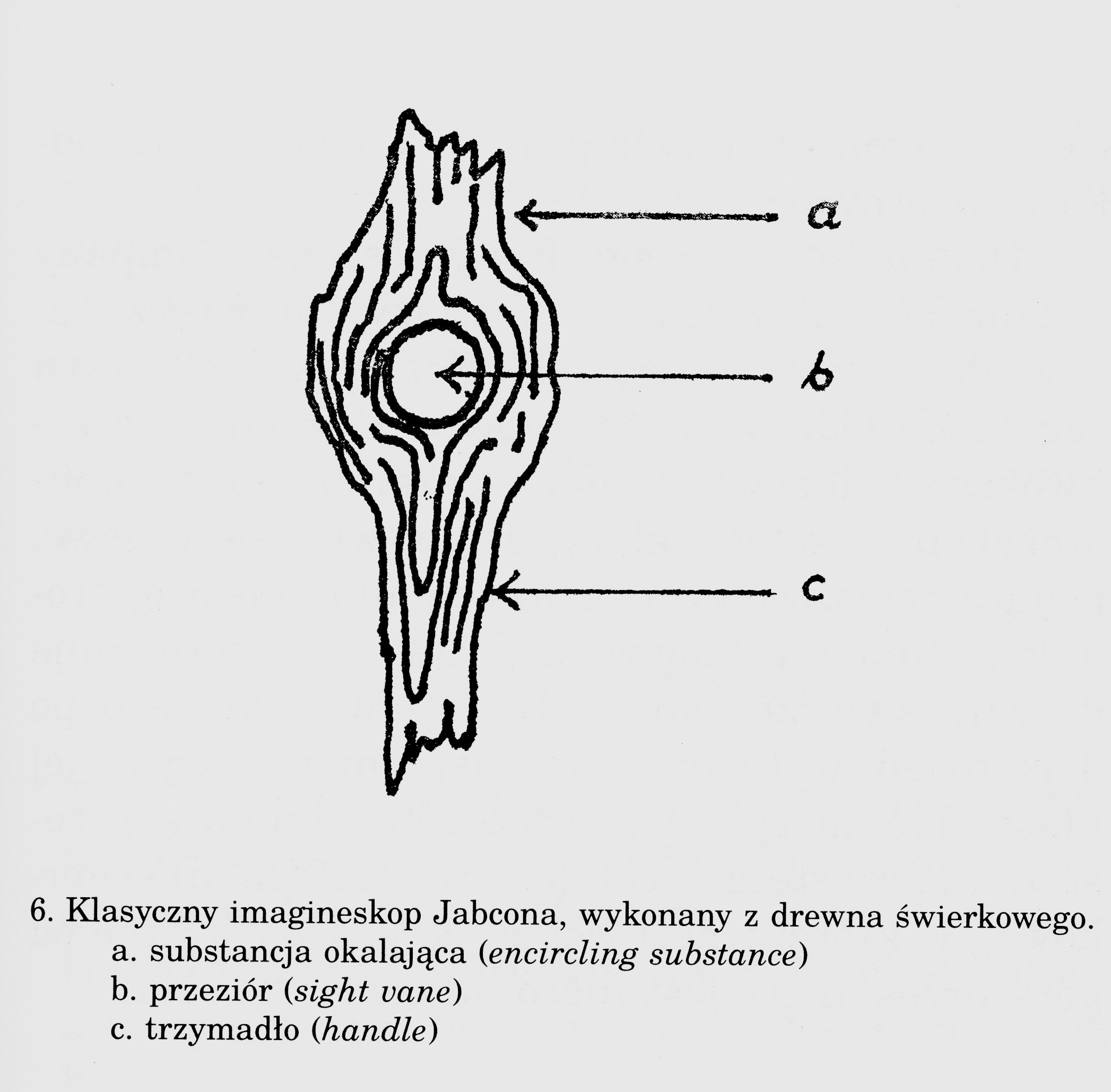
Jabcon's classical imaginescope – Figure 6 from Introduction to imaginescopy

He was the author of the text and drawings of the satirical Introduction to imaginescopy in a literary form of a "pastiche of scientific text". The book was first published in 1977 (Note: In 1973, four years before the book publication of Introduction to imaginescopy, the weekly magazine Życie Gospodarcze quoted the thought of "Jeremiasz Apollon Hytz" about "expanding imaginescopy" as a motto for a feuilleton ("Sprawozdawcy" (PDF). Życie gospodarcze. XXVIII (12): 16. 1973-03-25. "By doing anything we expand imagination, which begins to grow up into reality – Jeremiasz Apollon Hytz").) by Wydawnictwo Literackie under the pseudonym "Śledź Otrembus Podgrobelski" – his surname as the author is listed in library catalogs, (Note: Nietoperz Publishing House in Kraków published the second edition in 1992 in an edition of 5,000 copies. The book was also published by L&L Publishing House in Gdańsk in 1998 ("Wstęp do imagineskopii". Wydawnictwo L&L. 1998. Archived from the original on 2020-03-01.).) a review from 1979, bibliographic data from 1986, and some biographies, while the author's note in the 1998 edition indicates that the author was associated with Kraków.

The Introduction to imaginescopy also includes a bibliography of fictional scientific sources (30 items) which were described in a specialized lexicon in 2016. The fictitious creator of imaginescopy and the related pendology was the pharmacist-philosopher Jeremiasz Apollon Hytz (1841–1914) from Pidhaitsi – the author of the sentence "before whose logic even the most skeptical minds must yield: Every effect has its cause".

The author provided a description of imaginescopy:

The immediate means, stimulating the imagination through the sense of sight, and thus imaginescope – is any perforation perforating any solid substance to the end that through its orifice one might conduct perhaps one straight line.

— Śledź Otrembus Podgrobelski, Introduction to imaginescopy

Imaginescopy is a method of expanding imagination, the strengthening of which depends on the type of imaginescope used and its hypothetical technical parameters, which the book analyzes in a scientific style. The relationship between fiction and authenticity of these definitions and descriptions is complex, and "the separation of their scopes ceases to be solely a matter of simple assessment". The connection of imagination understood in this way "with art, and especially with poetry, still seems natural, common, and obvious".

The Introduction to imaginescopy "is essentially a 'fable' – a false apocrypha exposing the myth of objectivity and relativity of science". The book "imitates authenticity only to reveal its own falseness, and then to maintain it again". "The basic function of parody in Podgrobelski's book is to suggest literary quality," which can be understood similarly to the literary quality of contemporary Silva rerum. The book "seems ostentatiously playful", and its language is a pastiche of the formal scientific text used by the author in his professional scientific activity with mocking additions of the language known to him from the inhabitants of Podhale, as in the quote:

Pendoptics (otherwise: synoptics pendological) deals with forecasting pendoptic conditions in the near and distant future with an effect similar to that of meteorology. The grandfather Stopka, who was once observed on Hala Gąsienicowa, will remain a model for workers in both of these fields forever. He created absolutely reliable three pendoptic theses of grandfather Stopka:

Thesis I: – hy, gmy idom dołu, pijom wode ... Bedzie loć!

Thesis II: – hy, gmy idom hore, napiły sie ... Bedzie loć!

Thesis III: – hy, gmy ni ma... Bedzie loć!

— Śledź Otrembus Podgrobelski, fragments of Introduction to imaginescopy

In 1979, Jerzy Kmita, a philosopher and cultural theorist, compared the message of the Introduction to imaginescopy with the anti-positivist theses of Wilhelm Dilthey. Imaginescopy collaborates interdisciplinary with ethnography, archaeology, and especially with sociology and statistics, enriching them with practical aspects. According to Kmita, J.A. Hytz's theory assumes "that to empathize well, one must have a sufficiently broad imagination" and that "empathy is theoretically the most correct cognitive method". Without imaginescopy, "we do not possess proper, sufficiently developed insight into academic humanities". In the same year, Jerzy Pomorski pointed out the identity of Stanisław Moskal and Śledź Otrembus Podgrobelski, as well as the similarity of Podhale topics and interest in highland culture, including language, between Moskal's doctoral work and his Introduction to imaginescopy, which he called "a great Parkinsonian joke" and "a form of self-control rarely practiced by scientists today, to exaggerate slightly". The reviewer of the first edition of the Introduction to imaginescopy wrote in 1979:

Although the scope of practical applications of imaginescopy may already be impressive today, the future prospects exceed the boldest imaginings.

— Jerzy Kmita, from the review of Introduction to imaginescopy

In 2024, the relationship between quantum imaginescopy, a new branch of imaginescopy, and the concept of 'Schrödinger's cat' was discussed. However, despite its beneficial enhancement of the imagination, applied imaginescopy can have the negative effect of spreading misleading information and disrupting the development of artificial intelligence.

==== Literary and philosophical aspects ====
The Introduction to Imaginescopy and its form of a satirical scientific treatise have become the subject of literary analysis and interest on internet blogs. Reviews of the book compared it to the works of Sławomir Mrożek and Jaroslav Hašek as well as Cyril Parkinson and Edward Murphy. It was called a "literary delicacy". The author's "phenomenal sense of humor played on a thin string" was noted. One blogger stated that "if Monty Python wrote books, they would have written their own Introduction to imaginescopy".

The Introduction to imaginescopy served as source material for mathematical discussions, and the methodological principle of imaginescopy of determining "what is what" was invoked in detailed mathematical discussions as well as in a dissertation on the state of philosophy. The concept of imaginescopy in another philosophical dissertation was seen as "a better approximation of the function that imaginary representation fulfills in an intentional act". The content of the book also became an "important" basis for considerations on the ethics of historical discussions to "deepen and broaden" them. The usefulness of imaginescopy in assessing poetry dealing with fundamental issues was also noted, considering the "threshold of social intolerance in the case of overly extravagant imagination".

In 2012, an international onomastic conference organized by the Faculty of Philology of the University of Łódź and dedicated to toponymy placed the names of places mentioned in the Introduction to imaginescopy "between comedy and stylization". Imaginescopy also became the subject of interest in logic. The thesis of Śledź Otrembus Podgrobelski, that "one must rely on facts, and they speak for themselves – for they are facts that speak volumes" was accepted as a "classic" principle in describing the achievements of academic teaching and research teams. The style and concepts used in the Introduction to imaginescopy were useful in teaching foreign languages, in texts popularizing mathematics and astronomy, as well as in didactic method related to medical epidemiology.

The book also inspired the creation of science fiction, preparation of cabaret performances, and was an element of analysis in computer games. Its usefulness in film adaptations of non-literary materials was noted, as imaginescopy represents a "metaphor for science fiction" and also focuses on the "relationships between the future, humans, and technology". It found practical application in coaching, where training cards "act like classic imaginescopes". It was used in numismatic descriptions. In 2019, the use of imaginescopy was an argument in a discussion about the 1960 film Knights of the Teutonic Order.

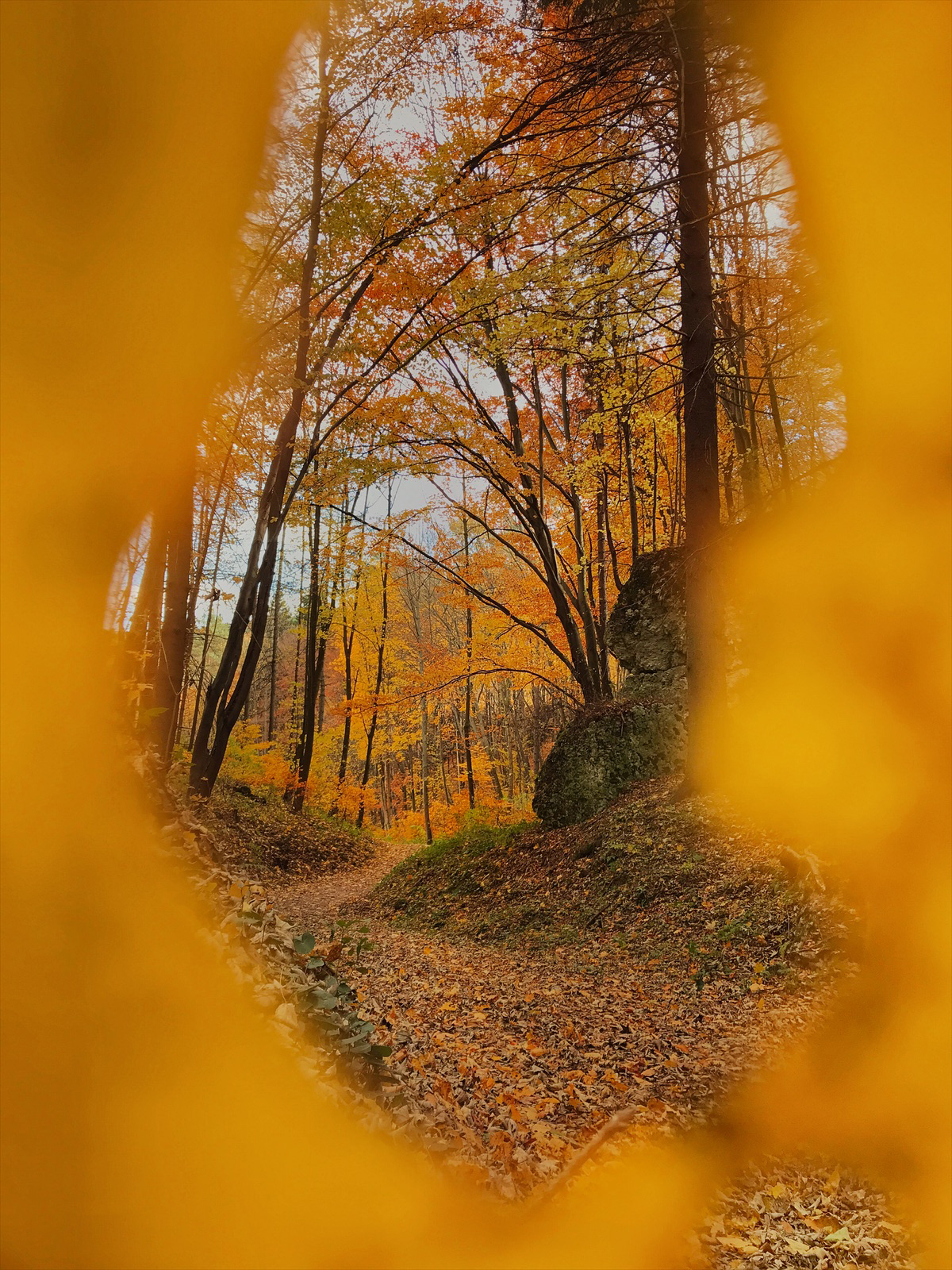
Natural imaginescope in the form of a hole in an autumn leaf in Ojców National Park

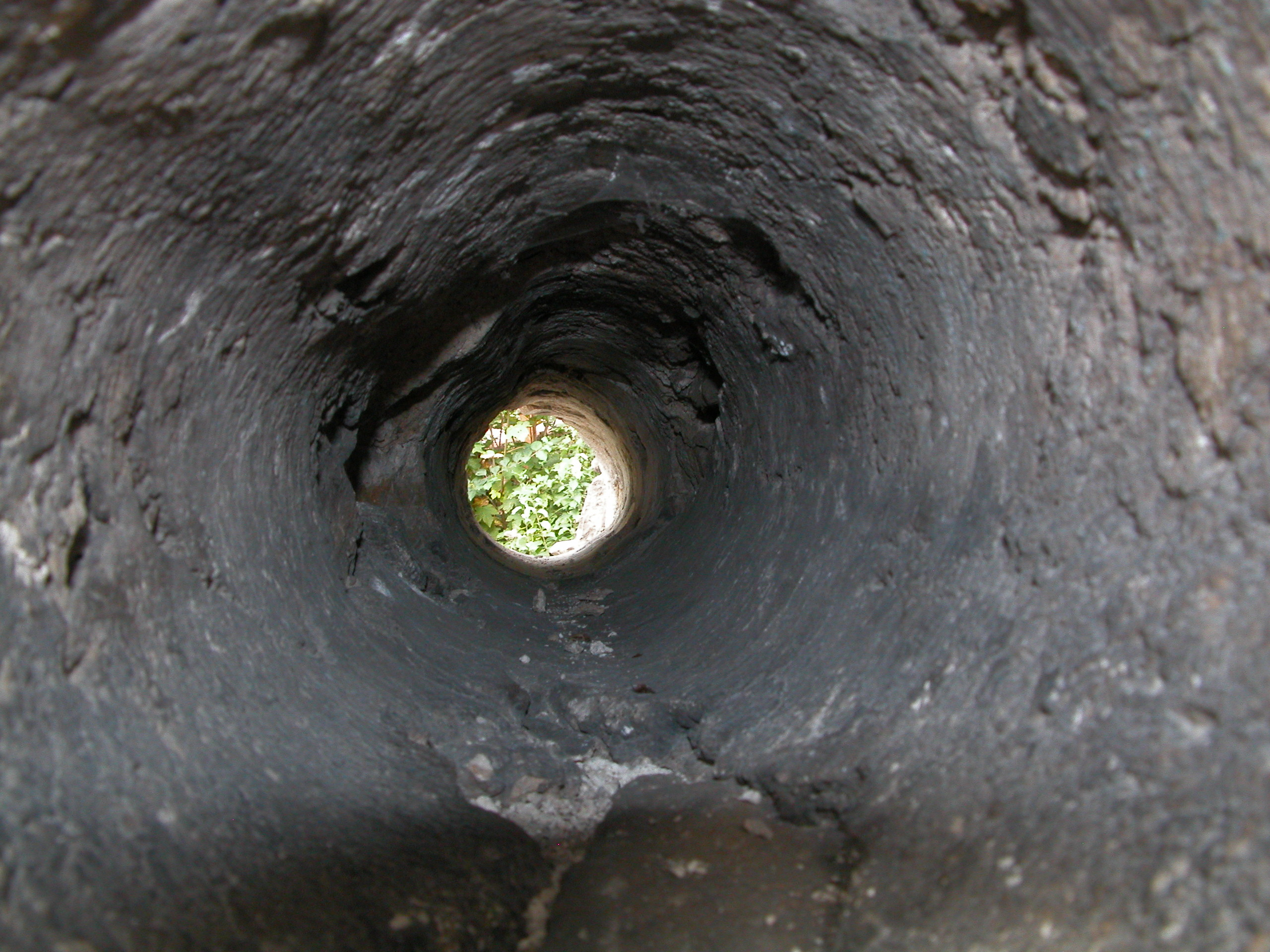
Fictional imaginescope identified in the walls of medieval Sobień Castle

The content of the Introduction to imaginescopy "expands the reader's imagination" similar to Stanisław Lem's fiction, to whom the authorship of this book was attributed. The author of the Introduction to imaginescopy was called a "Kraków sage" with "profound erudition". The fictional habilitation thesis of the "famous Śledź Otrembus Podgrobelski can teach us better than anything else what a scholarly style is and how, in striving to achieve it, not to make oneself too ridiculous". The Introduction to imaginescopy was considered a model of constructing a scholarly dissertation.

A passage from the alleged writings of Jeremiasz Apollon Hytz: "By multiplying anything, we enlarge reality, which begins to surpass imagination" was perceived as close to the modernists' observations on the concept of reality. In a literary essay from 2002, attention was drawn to another important thought of Jeremiasz: "Every Darkwood has its avant-garde, but every avant-garde also has its Darkwood".

The choral group of the tourist song "Society for Enlarging Imagination in the Name of Apollon Hytz" was formed in Choszczno in 2002 and received several artistic awards. In 2010, the name Hytz and the history of imaginescopy appeared on the BBC News blog. Jeremiasz Apollon Hytz was included in the list of participants in the jubilee celebrations held at the University of Silesia in 2011.

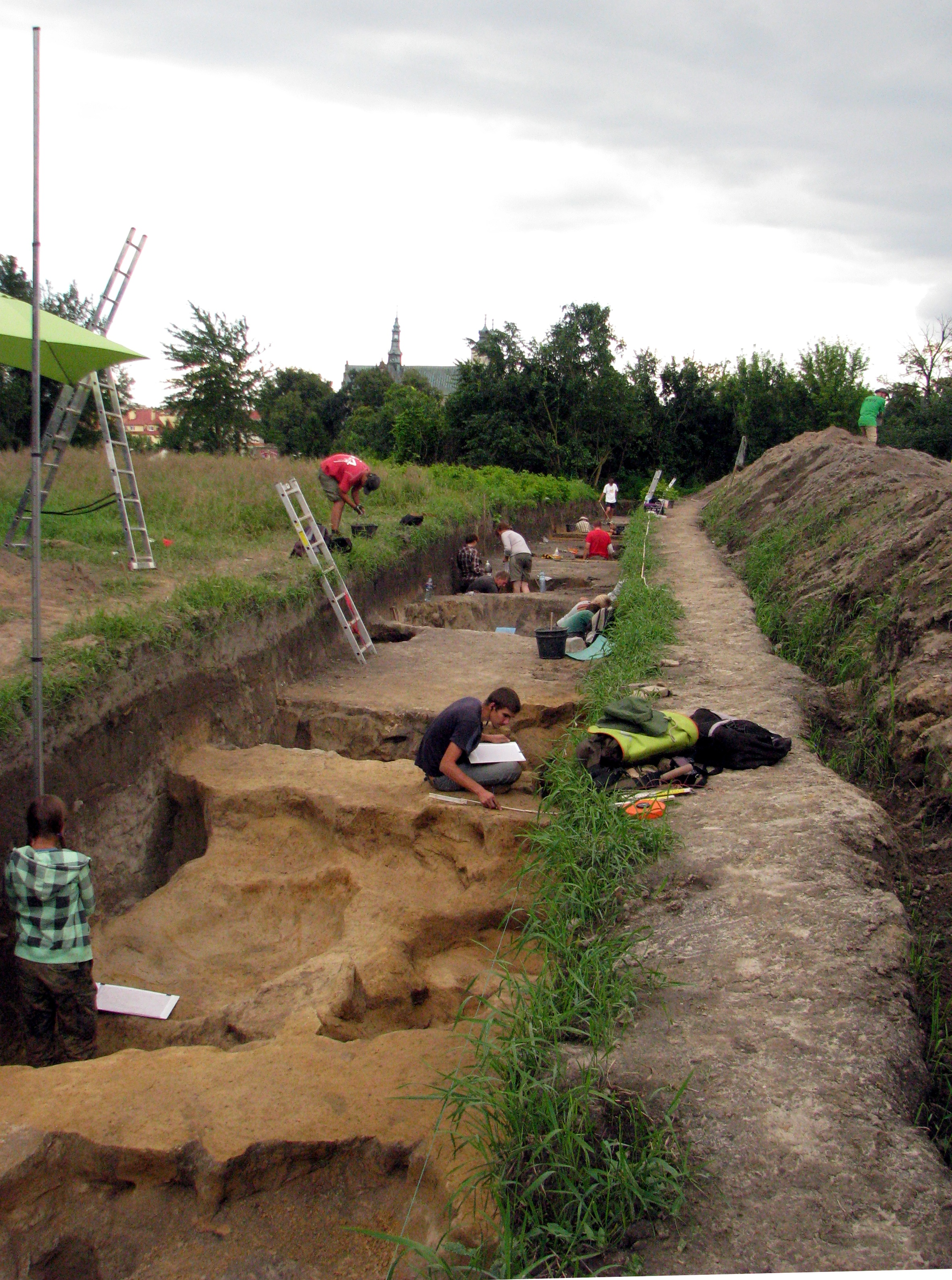
Archaeological site at the site of the former settlement of Żmigród in Opatów from the 12th–13th centuries

The use of imaginescope in nature allows one to be a "creator" and see "one's own image". A fictional medieval imaginescope was identified in 2013 within the walls of the 14th-century Sobień Castle. A natural specimen of the imaginescope "Jabcon" from a fragment of a thousand-year-old sequoia was found in 1999 in Prairie Creek Redwoods State Park in northern California.

Śledź Otrembus Podgrobelski approaches the possibility of "scientifically" shaping imagination very seriously, but "the way he does it questions the entire concept". In 2001, Śledź's book was nominated in Przekrój newmagazine for the "funniest book in the world". The Introduction to imaginescopy was submitted in 2009 by the publisher to the XVIII Nationwide Review of Travel and Tourist Books in Poznań. Another reprint was released in 2016. Each edition is marked as "revised and not corrected".

The book was classified by readers as one of a dozen "extraordinary bestsellers for April Fools' Day" and among the twelve books that "shaped Filip Łobodziński", who described it as "pure nonsense, a stream of pseudoscientific subconsciousness, a gallop of concepts, and a wonderful read for multiple uses".

Organizers of the "Manifestations of Poetry" festival in Warsaw in 2005 encouraged participants to create "imaginescopes in their spare time" according to Śledź's description. In 2019, the Introduction to imaginescopy was publicly read in Warsaw during the "Amazing" Book Festival. That same year, Stanisław Tym wrote, "Today I have dozens of imaginescopes, and I've made most of them myself".

The research method and abstractions proposed by Śledź Otrembus Podgrobelski find many interested parties who adapt them to their purposes. The need for using imaginescopy and various ways to expand imagination by university students was demonstrated in discussions on anthropological and archaeological topics based on Śledź's text. During the Student Conference of Friends of Archaeology in Lublin in 2017, the introduction of imaginescopy into the archaeology curriculum was advocated. In 2019, the principles of imaginescopy were successfully applied to the archaeological reconstruction of the history of Żmigród hill in Opatów. This research was related to the concept of the Żmij, a winged dragon from the beliefs of ancient Slavs, and its traces in Lesser Poland.

Over time, the author of the Introduction to imaginescopy is recognized as a "bold classic", and his remarks on imaginescopy and pendology, being "pseudo-knowledge", are seen as universal in relation to "non-fictional, institutionalized science". According to analysts, Śledź Otrembus Podgrobelski has shifted science "to the position of one of many equal narratives". The author has been described as one of the writers "who didn't want to be them at all". Imaginescope and imaginescopy have become useful concepts in numerous blogs and small literary forms. Śledź's book belongs to the texts of "new" prose, which "built their own conceptualizations of authenticity" and attempted to "free fiction from the rigors of servitude". The parody of scientific discourse in the Introduction to imaginescopy is an effective way of giving the author's statements "the characteristics of a work of art".

Imaginescopy, with its conceptual arsenal and inflated institutional life, still serves as a cipher by which supporters of higher humor recognize each other.

— Jan Gondowicz, from the review of Introduction to imaginescopy

Nature as perceived by the imaginescope is ‘the best doctor of our bodies and souls’. During the conference "Safety, Peace, Education – Priorities of Ukrainian Children's Education" held in Wałbrzych on 23 March 2022, Polish teachers supporting Ukrainian refugees were recommended educational materials with therapeutic value. It was proposed, among other things, to "use the imaginescope – an imaginative device that allows to stimulate the imagination and enrich it with optimistic elements of reality". Imaginescopes are indeed "an effective therapeutic tool that allows to find and experience positive emotions".

In 2022, Radio Kraków broadcast a program on the significance of imaginescopy in expanding natural imagination. In 2023, Szczepan Twardoch stated that the book by Śledź Otrembus Podgrobelski "is truly monstrously funny".

==== Artistic aspects ====
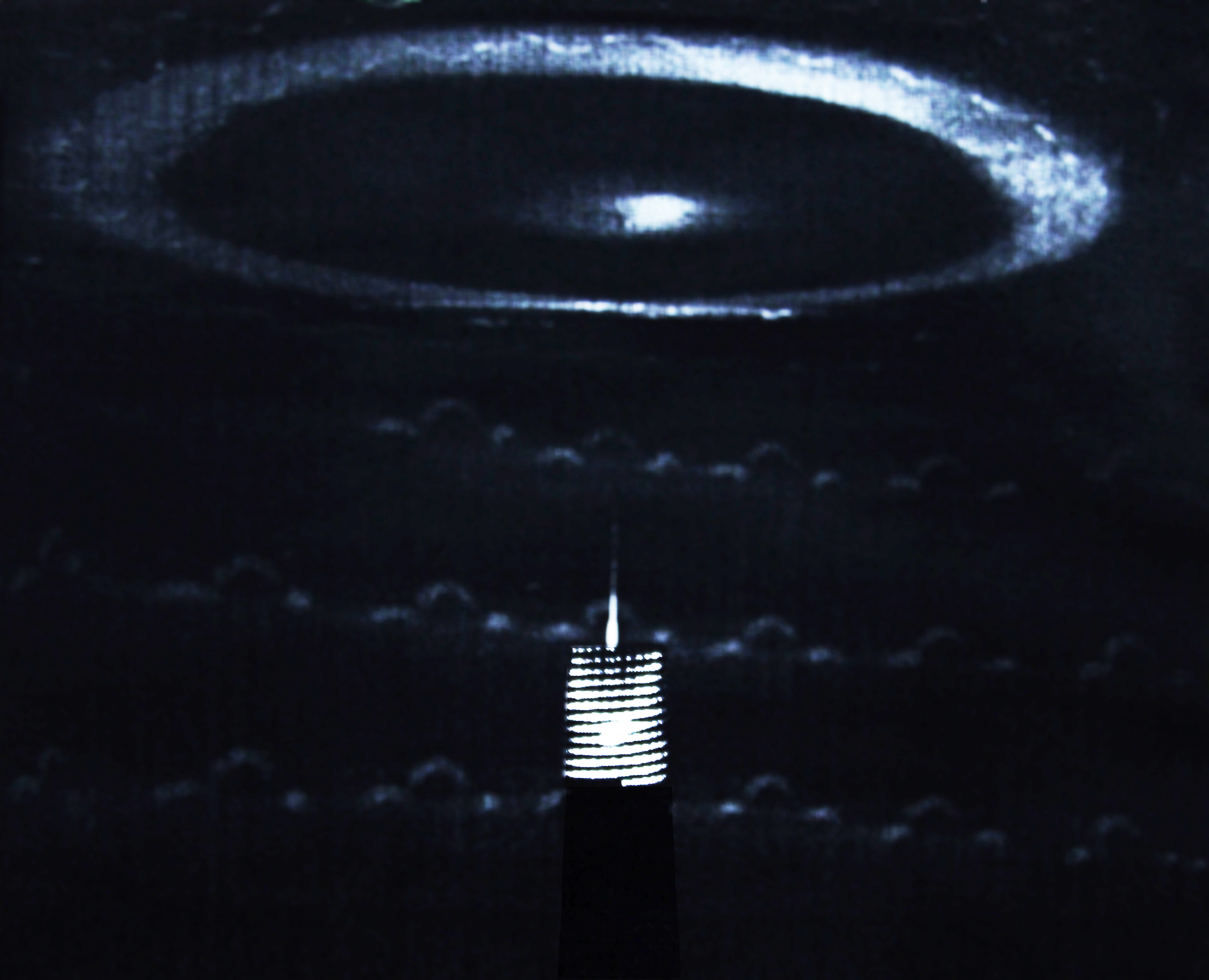
Leszek Lewandowski (2002) – Imaginescope, an optical-kinetic installation inspired by Introduction to imaginescopy. It is the effect of projecting light onto the walls of a darkened studio through a spinning, glowing cylinder with holes

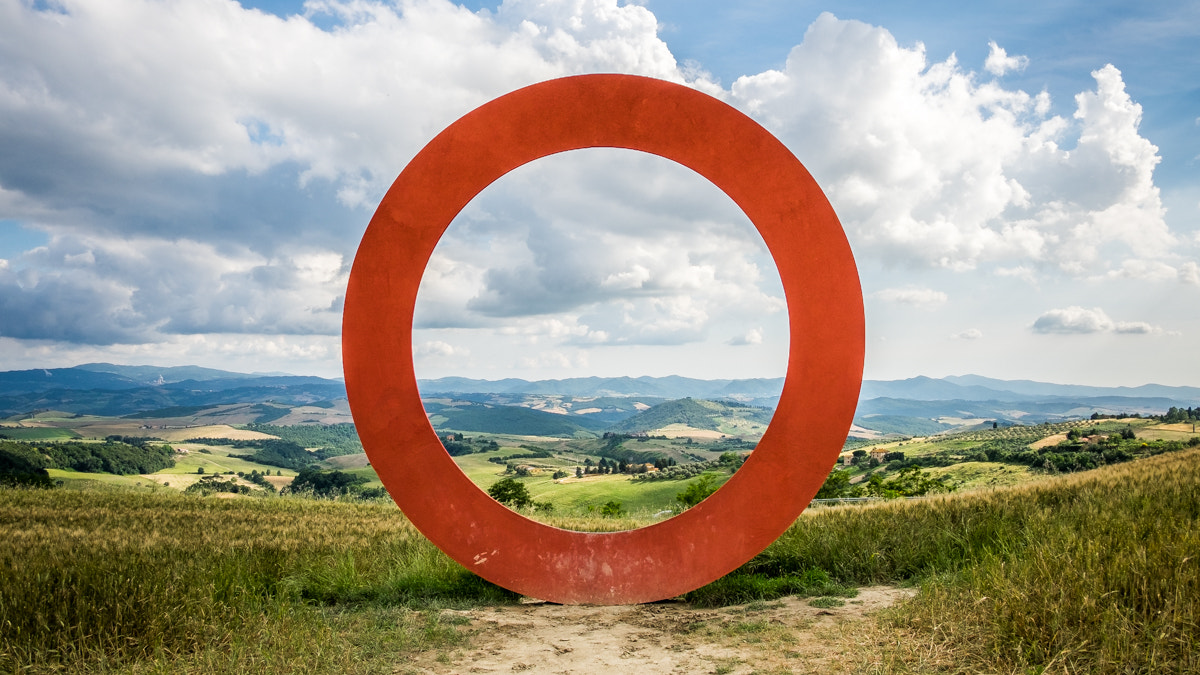
An outdoor spatial installation by sculptor Mauro Staccioli near Volterra, Tuscany

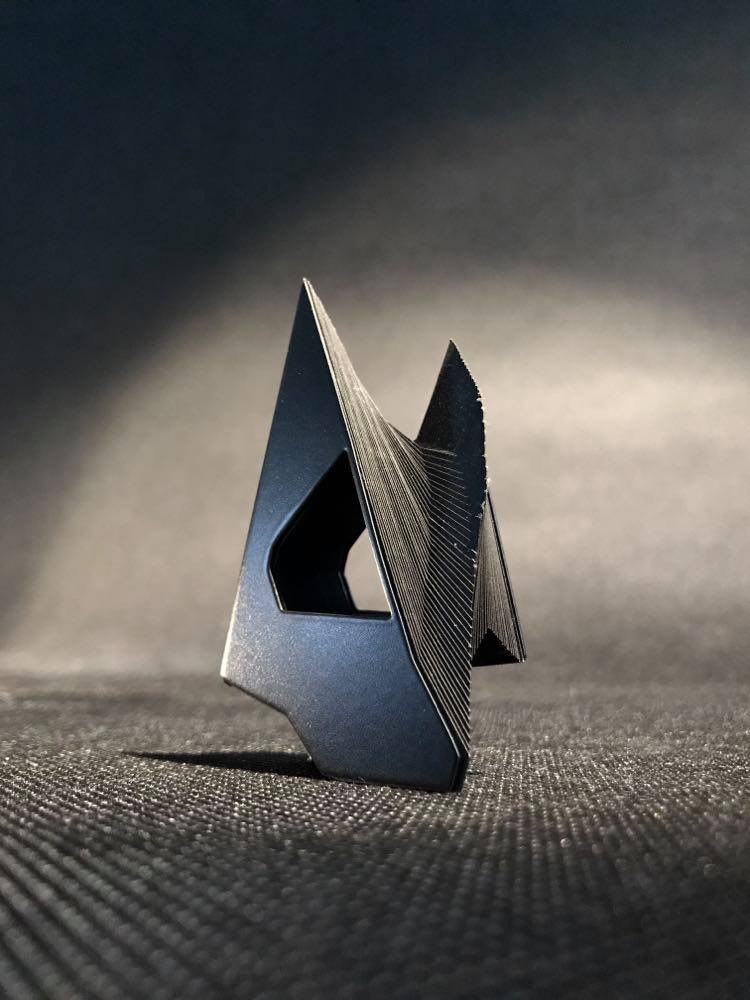
Imaginescope I (object-ring, paper, blackened brass, 8x5x2 cm, 2020) by Magdalena Szadkowska awarded at the 31st International Goldsmithing Art Competition "Quality" in Legnica in 2023

A group of artists from Bochum used a fictional computational theory described in the Introduction to imaginescopy and presented an artistic document in a German museum gallery in 2004 related to the form of literary text. This project was associated with another artistic experiment – the interpretation of the symbolism of sounds and signs, in this case resembling the imaginescope "hole" of the letter O. At the same exhibition, objects inspired by this concept were shown, as well as a new variation of the wooden imaginescope resembling the reproduced drawing of the "classic imaginescope of Jabcon". This modified imaginescope model, equipped with "double hole protection", was exhibited in 2008 at the Anna Akhmatova Museum in St. Petersburg.

The book by Śledź also inspired an artistic installation called Imaginoscope by Leszek Lewandowski, which was exhibited in 2015 at the Galeria Bielska BWA and later purchased by the Arsenal Gallery in Białystok. This optical-kinetic installation uses a rotating cylinder that projects light spirals onto the walls of the room. Viewers undergo various perceptual disturbances and states close to hypnosis. Lewandowski artistically influences the imagination of the audience and "arranges a situation balancing on the border of playing with the viewer and experiments with illusion, to provoke viewers to reflect on uncritically internalized images of the world", as well as confronting them with the "essentially unfathomable power of imagination" according to the description by Śledź Otrembus Podgrobelski.

In 2019, the use of imaginescope principles was noted in outdoor spatial installations by sculptor Mauro Staccioli, exhibited on hills around the town of Volterra in Tuscany. The minimalist installations harmonize with the landscape and give the observer "the opportunity to change the perspective".

The statement by Jeremiasz Apollon Hytz that "By multiplying anything, we enlarge reality, which begins to surpass imagination" also served as inspiration for a carpenter-artist who, in the second decade of the 21st century in Stare Kawkowo in Warmia, runs an applied arts gallery offering various portable imaginescopes. In nearby Brąswałd, wooden imaginescopes are constructed for children, which "develop imagination instead of replacing it". In 1979, the introduction of the import of "imaginescope industry products" was proposed.

The concept of imaginescope has also been adapted by a painter, art critic, graphic designer, photographer, theater researcher, theater economics specialist, as well as a specialist in sociology of social change. Another example of imaginescopy application is a pinhole camera.

In 2021, the role of imaginescopy in the sculptural work of Leopold Buczkowski was analyzed by Ewa Klekot. In the same year, it was noted that the application of imaginescopy concepts in architecture enables a "useful contribution to the answer to the question why? and to prospective thinking".

In 2023, an exhibition titled Imaginescopes by sculptor Magdalena Szadkowska was opened in Łódź, who considers imaginescopes as "emotional objects that are to become a bridge to journey into the depths of one's own imagination". In the same year, during the 31st International Competition of Goldsmithing Art in Legnica, she received the Inhorgenta Munich Trade Fair award, as well as several other distinctions, for the concept of two rings named Imaginescope (I and II) capable of "enlarging imagination" made of blackened paper and brass, as well as paper and silver. The artist also creates large outdoor sculptures.

=== Niegdysiejsze śniegi, niegdysiejsze mgły ===
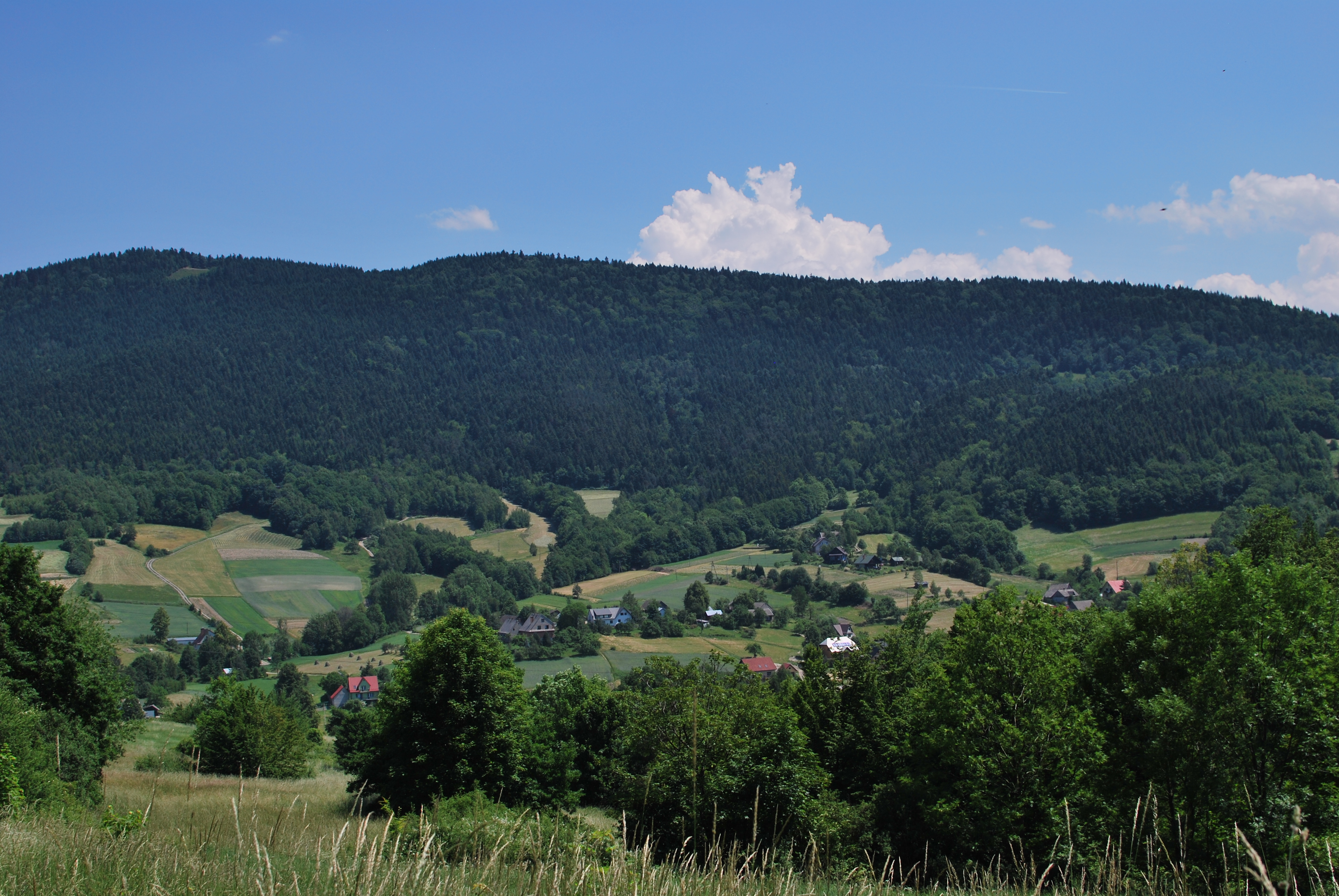
View from the west of the village of Wierzbanowa in the Island Beskids. The Cietnia Range (829 meters above sea level) is visible

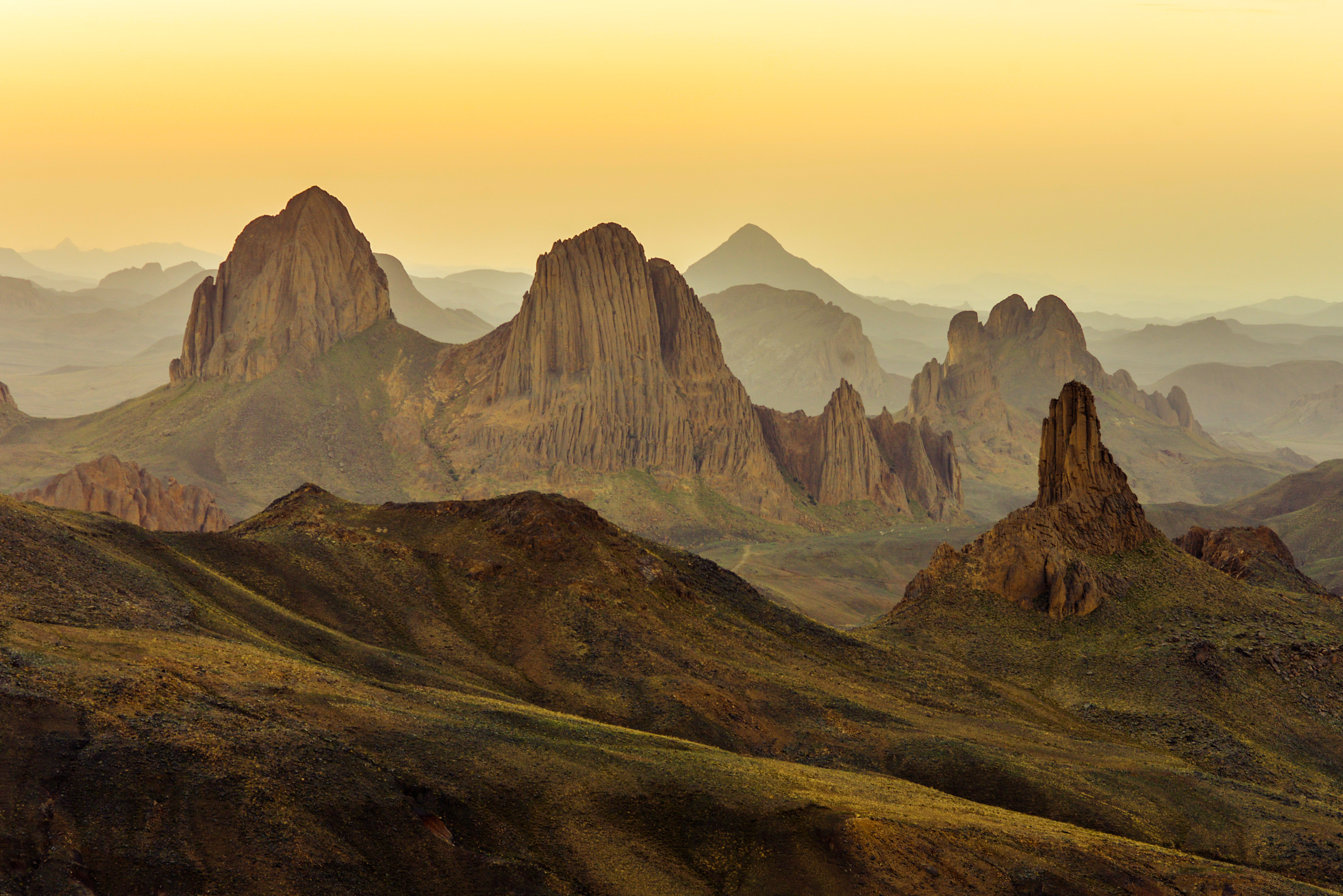
Hoggar Mountains on the border of Algeria and Niger

Stanisław Moskal, under the same pseudonym, wrote the memoir volume Niegdysiejsze śniegi, niegdysiejsze mgły (Former Snows, Former Mists) in 2012. (Note: The title Niegdysiejsze śniegi, niegdysiejsze mgły is a paraphrase of the refrain from the medieval French ballad Le Testament, as well as the play Where Are the Snows of Yesteryear by Tadeusz Kantor (Gdzie są niegdysiejsze śniegi. Cricotage Tadeusza Kantora. FINA. 1985. Archived from the original on 2019-12-07.).) "A capital work," wrote a reviewer, "we read it aloud with my wife, savoring it..." The reviewer pointed out the author's rural and mountain fascination – first Sułkowice near Kraków, then the highland village of Kowaniec near Nowy Targ, later the Bieszczady Mountains, wanderings with his wife "Szprotka" in the Gorce Mountains, Tatras, and finally Wierzbanowa, where he built a house.

His father, Stanisław, was born in the Pod Groblą house in Sułkowice, leaving behind extensive memoir manuscripts. The name of the house inspired the adoption of the literary pseudonym "Podgrobelski". The author spent his student summer months with his uncle Władysław, which provided an opportunity for numerous hikes and getting to know the atmosphere of the Beskid countryside. He became a lover of folklore and an expert in the local subdialects of Podhale. Being both a sociologist and an economist of rural areas, he got to know these regions "deeper than their inhabitants".

After completing his initial studies, he did a year-long internship on a farm in Switzerland, then traveled through Siberia and spent many years in the desert of Algeria. Everywhere, he was interested in the local geographic, landscape, and ethnographic values, which he described in his memoir book.

Together with his wife, he embarked on a camel expedition across the desert from Tamanrasset to the foothills of the Hoggar Mountains on the border between Algeria and Niger. In 1987, one of the Algerian national parks – the Ahaggar National Park – was established in this area.

The author takes the reader through the stages and places of his life, often exotic, from the perspective of a scientist with international experience, to whom "fate designated Polishness as the soil of his roots". "For Śledź, the mountains and sails become a religion, travel, movement, (...) and the world of general concepts and written with capital letters values and rules is thrown into the cabaret, into the domain of wit and mockery".

In the conclusion of these memoirs, he wrote, "that although I can do little now, I must even less, and yet the grand must remains, but the non-must still winks".

== Other information ==
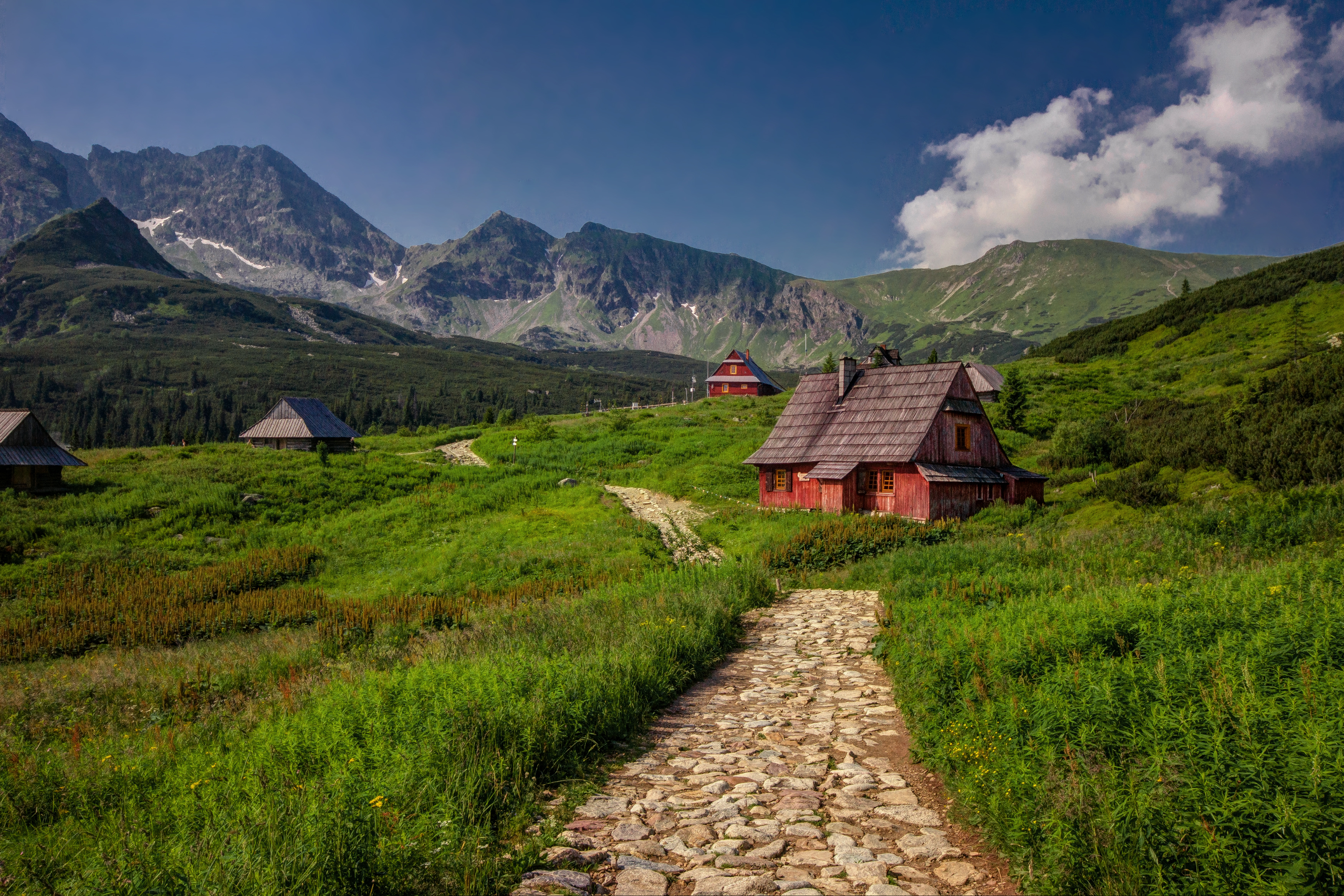
Hala Gąsienicowa, view on Betlejemka

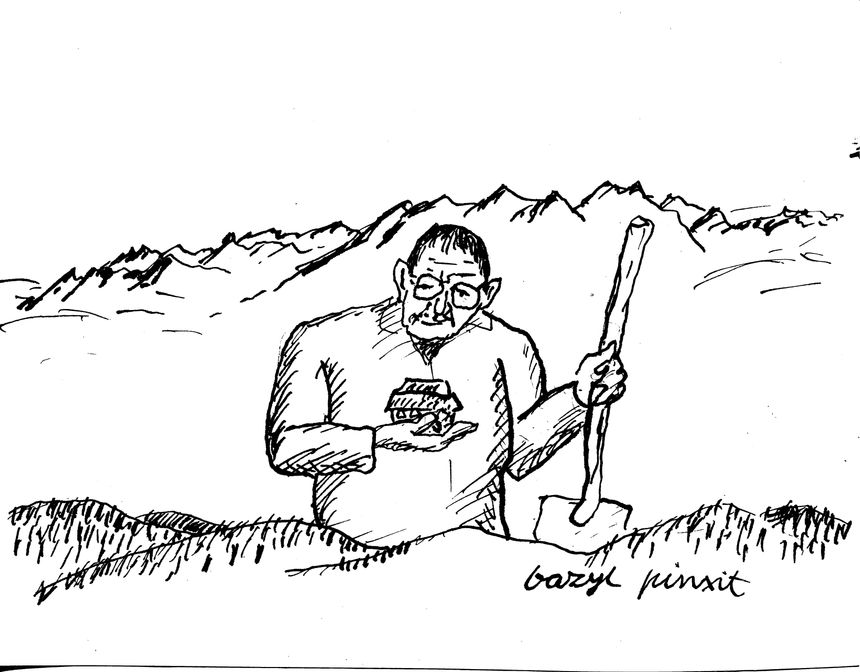
Stanisław "Śledź" Moskal builds a house in Wierzbanowa – drawing by Basil Murawa, 2018

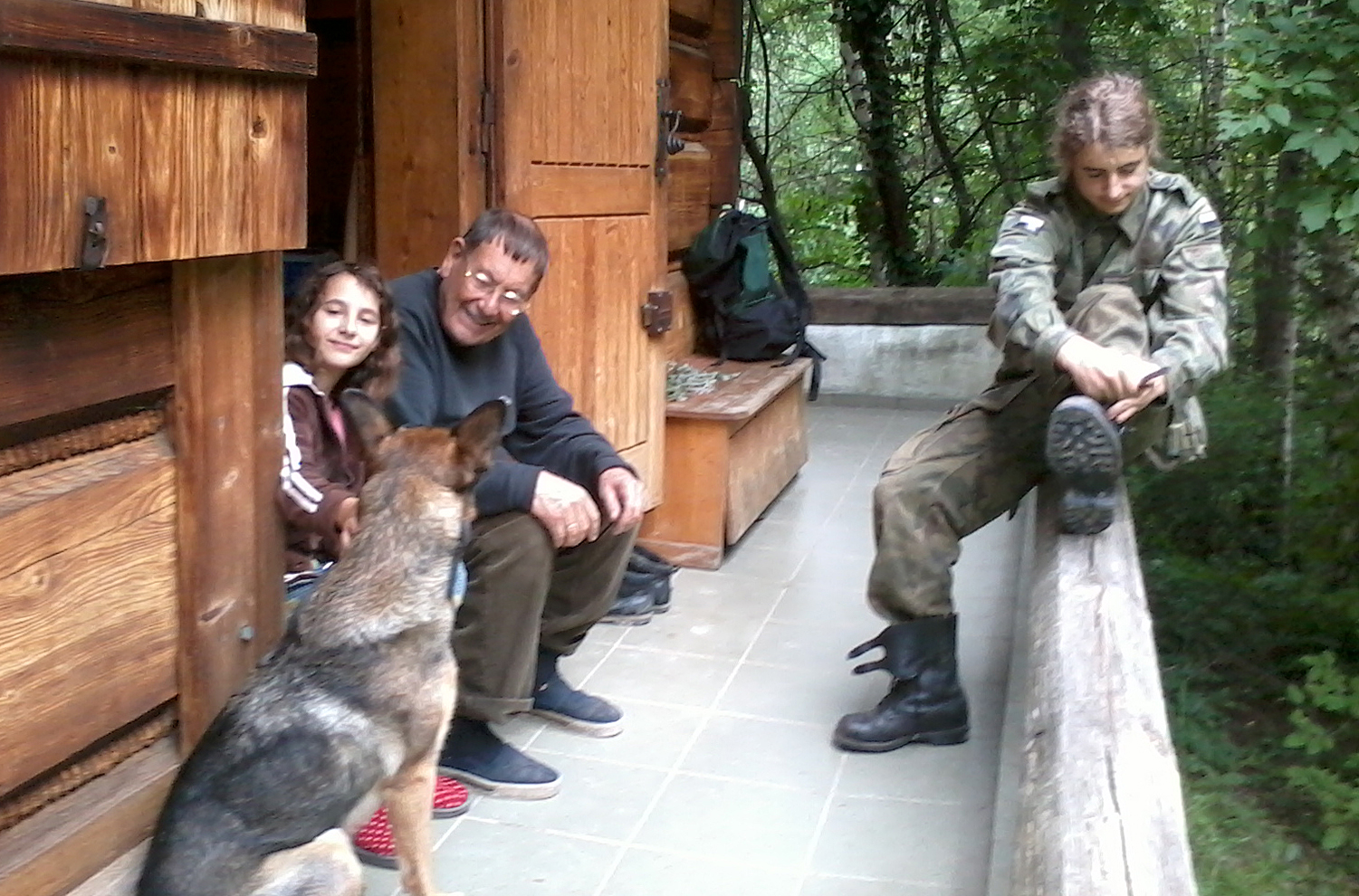
Stanisław "Śledź" Moskal with his grandchildren in front of his house in Wierzbanowa in 2012

He was a lover of the Tatra Mountains and Podhale region. The concept of the Introduction to imaginescopy was developed in the 1960s during stays at Hala Gąsienicowa in a small mountain hut called Betlejemka, which mainly attracted young mountaineers and skiers. The shelter was built around 1914 by the Bustrycki family. In 1964, at the initiative of Śledź (Stanisław Moskal), the International Bureau for the Expansion of Imagination was established there. During this period, the name Betlejemka began to be used. Above the door hung a sign: "Betlejemka. High Mountain Hut in the name of Jeremiasz Apollon Hytz". Inside, there was a plaque commemorating his achievements ("Even a worm marvels at the achievements of J. A. Hytz"). His fundamental achievement was proving that "every effect has its cause". The atmosphere of Betlejemka, in the political and social conditions of that time, greatly contributed to the creation of the satirical concept of imaginescopy and the character of Jeremiasz Apollon Hytz. In 1972, Stanisław Moskal participated in negotiations between the High Mountain Club and the Tatra National Park regarding the establishment of a mountaineering school in Betlejemka.

The International Bureau for the Expansion of Imagination operated before the first publication of the Introduction to imaginescopy in 1977. During the 7th National Tourist Song Fair in Szklarska Poręba in 1974, the bureau promoted "an optimistic view of the world using a device called the persight-imaginoscope". Later, the Bureau moved its activities to Kuków and in 2004 was described on the map of the Babiogórskie and Jałowieckie ranges. (Note: The International Bureau for the Expansion of Imagination was located in Kuków, as indicated by the text on the back of the tourist map of the Babiogórskie and Jałowieckie Range issued in 2004: "The International Bureau for the Expansion of Imagination under the leadership of President Karol Wieńczysław Hommont; Kuków, Hycówki 3, villa Szynszynella (...) The staff represents the highest professional level – at least the rank of an imaginator technician. If necessary, the rapid action team rapidly reaches any place on the globe – facilitated by pendolots produced by Honda factories in Honduras".)

Stanisław Moskal was also a sailor, skier, horseback rider, and traveler. He most eagerly returned to the southern Polish mountains and their inhabitants, to whom he dedicated his professional sociological research. When he began work on the Introduction to imaginescopy, later called a "cult outlaw book", he was a sociology student after completing agricultural studies and with international professional experience. He wrote the autobiography Niegdysiejsze śniegi, niegdysiejsze mgły (Former Snows, Former Mists) "for my grandchildren" from the perspective of the years 2007–2011 in his favorite place, Wierzbanowa in the Island Beskids mountains. In the wooden house he built there in the local style, he collected exhibits for his own ethnographic museum.

He claimed to be passionate about ethnography, ethnology, and the history of civilization.

== Commemoration ==
Memoirs have appeared on online portals and internet forums, as well as in printed publications. A text in an academic journal states that he was "an extraordinary person" who "helped young scholars find their own imaginescope".
