= Andrzej Ziemiański =

Polish writer (born 1960)

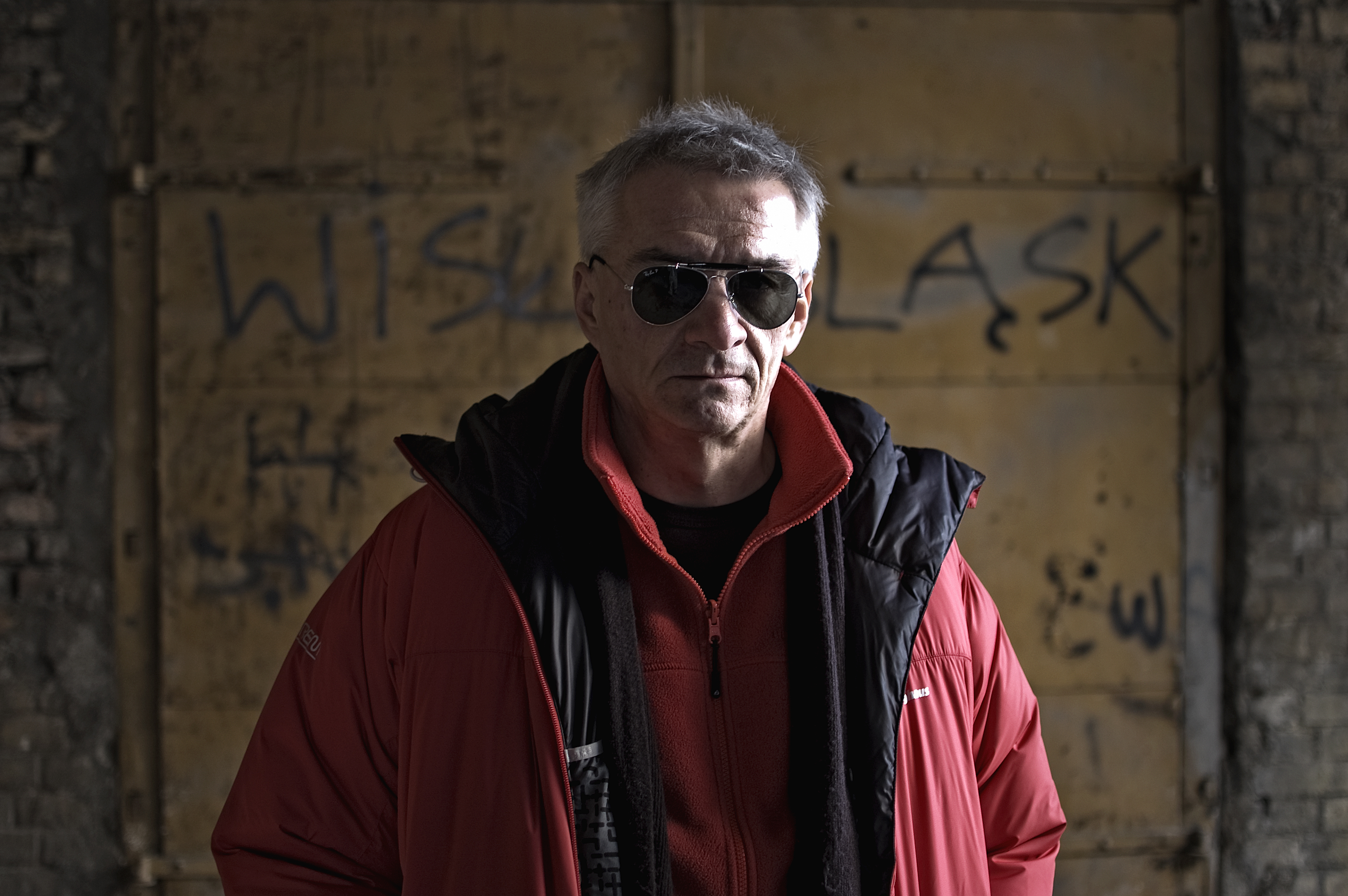
- Born: 17 February 1960 (age 66); Wrocław, Poland
- Occupations: writer and columnist
- Writing career
- Pen name: Patrick Shoughnessy
- Period: since 1978
- Genres: science fiction, fantasy, detective story, crime
- Website: ziemianski.com.pl

Andrzej Ziemiański, also known as Patrick Shoughnessy (born 17 February 1960), is a Polish author of fantasy, science fiction, thriller and crime, who by 2012 have sold over 500,000 copies of his books. Ziemiański was educated as an architect and he holds a PhD in architecture. Ziemiański is best known for his epic fantasy/sci-fi series Achaia.

== Biography ==
Andrzej Ziemiański was born in Wrocław, Poland, where he grew up and settled. He graduated from the Faculty of Architecture at Wroclaw University of Technology in 1983. Subsequently, he worked as a fellow researcher and professor in various institutions. In 1992, he acquired a PhD in technical sciences. Since 2010, the author teaches Creative Writing at the Faculty of Journalism at University of Wroclaw.

Ziemiański started publishing short stories and novels in 1978, at first in the sci-fi genre. At one time, Ziemiański would also publish using a pen name Patrick Shoughnessy (Przesiadka w piekle, 1991). Subsequently, he withdrew from having his work published and remained silent for a decade. Ziemiański returned to writing at the turn of the century, quickly becaming one of the most prominent Polish writers of fantastika. His short stories, such as Bomba Heisenberga, Autobahn nach Poznań or Zapach szkła, would win first prize in popularity polls among readers, and two of them (Autobahn nach Poznań and Zapach szkła) won Janusz A. Zajdel Award. At the 2002 Sfinks Award, four various Ziemiański’s short stories won subsequently: seventh, third, second and first prize.

During that time, the first part of Achaia (2002) trilogy was published and it quickly became a bestselling series. His Achaia series was deemed to be one of the most important novels in modern Polish fantasy. The trilogy strengthened the author's position by settling into the Polish canon of fantasy genre. The following Achaia volumes (as well as their continuation – Pomnik cesarzowej Achai [2012]) would top bestseller lists. Ziemiański's other novels were also well-received leading publishers' books rankings. Ziemiański fashioned a world that transgressed the border between life and fiction. The main protagonist of the series, Achaia, became synonymous with a certain type of female character and numerous readers identified with her. The novel entered Polish fantasy canon, and the author became one of the most recognizable brands in the Polish publishing market. His novels and short stories often top bestseller lists and popularity rankings.

In 1997 he was one of the creators and until 2001 the first chief editor of Fahrenheit, the first Polish Internet science fiction fanzine. In 2004, he left the zine.

In 2010, Ziemiański wrote a blog regarding railways, which was awarded the first prize by the Social Media, Poland, in the category of Corporate Blog.

He has also written a more mainstream novel, such as Miecz Orientu, which was published in episodes in the Twórczość magazine. The novel was later published as a whole in 2006.

== Awards ==
- 2000, 2001, 2002 – first prize for Best Short Story of the Year from Nowa Fantastyka magazine
- 2001 Sfinks Award, Polish Short Story of the Year, „Bomba Heisenberga”
- 2002 Janusz A. Zajdel Award, „Autobahn nach Poznań”
- 2002 Sfinks Award, Polish Short Story of the Year, „Waniliowe plantacje Wrocławia”
- Bacchus Cup, „Autobahn nach Poznań”
- 2003 Nautilus, „Zapach szkła”
- 2003 Nautilus, Achaia volume 2
- 2003 Sfinks Award, Polish Short Story of the Year, „Legenda, czyli pijąc wódkę we Wrocławiu w 1999 roku”
- 2003 Sfinks Award, Polish Novel of the Year, Achaia
- 2004 Janusz A. Zajdel Award, „Zapach szkła”
- 2004 Sfinks Award, Polish Short Story of the Year, „Zapach szkła”
- 2010 Social Media, Poland, Best Corporate blog wroclawnowyglowny.pl/blog

== Bibliography ==
Ziemiański's novels and short stories were translated into Czech, Slovak and Russian language.

=== Novels ===
- Wojny urojone (Iskry 1987, ISBN 83-207-0969-5, w odcinkach w „Kurierze Polskim” oraz w Programie III Polskiego Radia)
- Zabójcy szatana (KAW 1989, ISBN 83-03-02648-8, wspólnie z Andrzejem Drzewińskim, w odcinkach w Kurierze Polskim)
- Bramy strachu (Wydawnictwo Dolnośląskie 1990, ISBN 83-7023-044-X, wznowienie: 2006, ISBN 83-7384-446-5)
- Nostalgia za Sluag Side (KAW 1990, wspólnie z Andrzejem Drzewińskim)
- Dziennik czasu plagi (Europa 1991, ISBN 83-85336-00-1 oraz w odcinkach w Polskim Radiu Wrocław)
- Przesiadka w przedpieklu (CIA-Books/SVARO 1991, ISBN 83-85100-40-7, pod pseudonimem Patrick Shoughnessy, wznowiona pod własnym nazwiskiem jako Przesiadka w piekle, DW Ares 2004, ISBN 83-920235-1-X)
- Miecz Orientu, Wydawnictwo Dolnośląskie 2006, ISBN 83-7384-454-6.
- Toy wars, Fabryka Słów 2008, ISBN 978-83-60505-97-7.
- Breslau forever, Fabryka Słów 2008, ISBN 978-83-7574-073-8.
- Ucieczka z Festung Breslau (tytuł autora: The Holmes), Wydawnictwo Dolnośląskie 2009, ISBN 978-83-245-8895-4.
- Das Building (jak sam pisarz informuje: powieść jest skończona i wstępnie zredagowana, jednak z uwagi na niezadowalający autora efekt, szanse na to by została wydana są bardzo nikłe)
- Wzgórze zwane Cymbo (początkowo powieść miała nosić tytuł Czarownice, prace nad powieścią zostały przerwane. Fragment został opublikowany w antologii Strefa Mroku)
- Żołnierze grzechu, Wydawnictwo Bukowy Las 2010, ISBN 978-83-62478-15-6.
- Za progiem grobu, Fabryka Słów 2012, ISBN 978-83-7574-695-2.

==== Achaia ====
- Achaia
  - tom I (Fabryka Słów 2002, ISBN 83-89011-05-0)
  - tom II (Fabryka Słów 2003, ISBN 83-89011-33-6)
  - tom III (Fabryka Słów 2004, ISBN 83-89011-25-5)
- Pomnik Cesarzowej Achai
  - tom I (Fabryka Słów 2012)
  - tom II (Fabryka Słów 2013)
  - tom III (Fabryka Słów 2014)
  - tom IV (Fabryka Słów 2014)
  - tom V (Fabryka Słów 2014)
- Virion
  - Wyrocznia - tom I (Fabryka Słów 2017, ISBN 978-83-7964-260-1)
  - Obława - tom II (Fabryka Słów 2018, ISBN 978-83-7964-357-8)
  - Adept - tom III (Fabryka Słów 2019, ISBN 978-83-7964-415-5 )
  - Szermierz - tom IV (Fabryka Słów 2019, ISBN 978-83-7964-516-9)
- Szermierz Natchniony
  - Zamek - tom I (Fabryka Słów 2021, ISBN 9788379646296)
  - Pustynia - tom II (Fabryka Słów 2022, ISBN 9788379647088)
  - Legion - tom III (Fabryka Słów 2023, ISBN 9788379648559)
- Legenda
  - Krew - tom I (Fabryka Słów 2024, ISBN 9788379649914)
  - Ona - tom II (Fabryka Słów 2025, ISBN 9788383750378)

=== Short story anthologies ===
- Daimonion (Iskry 1985, ISBN 83-207-0762-5, opowiadania: Blisko granicy, Czekając na barbarzyńców, Daimonion, Koloryt lokalny, Port, Reguły gry, Twarze, Zakład zamknięty)
- Zapach szkła (Fabryka Słów 2004, ISBN 83-89011-48-4, opowiadania: Autobahn nach Poznań, Bomba Heisenberga, Zapach szkła, Waniliowe plantacje Wrocławia, Legenda, czyli pijąc wódkę we Wrocławiu w 1999 roku, Lodowa opowieść, Czasy, które nadejdą)
- Toy Wars (Fabryka Słów 2008, opowiadania: Toy Toy Song, Toy Trek, minipowieść Toy Wars – Wojownik Ostatecznej Zagłady)
- A jeśli to ja jestem Bogiem (tytuł roboczy – zbiór w przygotowaniu. Planowane wydanie – połowa roku 2013. Opowiadania: A jeśli to ja jestem Bogiem, Polski dom, Wypasacz, Chłopaki, wszyscy idziecie do piekła, Pułapka Tesli)

=== Short stories ===
- Zakład zamknięty („Sigma” 101, 1978–1979, „Fantastyka" 2/1982, zbiór Daimonion, Iskry 1985, antologia "Spotkanie w przestworzach 4", KAW 1985)
- Twarze (antologia Bunt robotów Gorzowski Klub Miłośników Fantastyki i Fantastyki Naukowej 1980, zbiór Daimonion, Iskry 1985)
- Koloryt lokalny ("Sigma" 120/121, 1980–1981, zbiór Daimonion, Iskry 1985, antologia Spotkanie w przestworzach 4, KAW 1985)
- Blisko granicy (fanzin "No Wave" 01-02 (01) 1982, zbiór Daimonion, Iskry 1985)
- Poziom zerowy (fanzin "No Wave" 01-02 (01) 1982)
- Martwa fala (fanzin "No Wave" 01 (03) 1983)
- Gra (fanzin "No Wave" 02 (04) 1983)
- Ghost (wspólnie z Andrzejem Drzewińskim, "Młody Technik" 4/1983, "Science Fiction" 4/2003)
- Czekając na barbarzyńców (zbiór Daimonion, Iskry 1985)
- Daimonion (zbiór Daimonion, Iskry 1985)
- Port (zbiór Daimonion, Iskry 1985)
- Reguły gry (zbiór Daimonion, Iskry 1985)
- Precedens (wspólnie z Andrzejem Drzewińskim, "Młody Technik" 11/1985, fanzin "Phantasma" 01 (01) 1986)
- Czasy, które nadejdą (Informator konwentowy World Science Fiction Meeting, Polcon-Krakon. Tom 2, KAW 1991, "Science Fiction" 6/2001, zbiór Zapach szkła, Fabryka Słów 2004)
- Bomba Heisenberga ("Nowa Fantastyka" 9/2000, zbiór Zapach szkła, Fabryka Słów 2004)
- Toy Toy Song ("Science Fiction" 1/2001, zbiór Toy, Fabryka Słów, 2008)
- Autobahn nach Poznań ("Science Fiction" 2/2001, antologia Zajdel 2001, Fabryka Słów 2002, zbiór Zapach szkła, Fabryka Słów 2004)
- Toy Trek ("Science Fiction" 4/2001, zbiór Toy, Fabryka Słów, 2008)
- Waniliowe plantacje Wrocławia ("Nowa Fantastyka" 9/2001, zbiór Zapach szkła, Fabryka Słów 2004)
- Lodowa opowieść ("Science Fiction" 5/2002, zbiór Zapach szkła, Fabryka Słów 2004)
- Czarownice (antologia "Strefa mroku – jedenastu apostołów grozy" – dodatek do czasopisma "Click! Fantasy", grudzień 2002)
- Legenda, czyli pijąc wódkę we Wrocławiu w 1999 roku ("Nowa Fantastyka" 10-12/2002, zbiór Zapach szkła, Fabryka Słów 2004)
- Spadek (antologia "Wizje alternatywne 4" Wydawnictwo Solaris 2002)
- Ghost II – dwadzieścia lat później (wspólnie z Andrzejem Drzewińskim, "Science Fiction" 4/2003)
- Zapach szkła ("Nowa Fantastyka" 10-12/2003, zbiór Zapach szkła, Fabryka Słów 2004)
- Ciężka sprawa (antologia "Wizje alternatywne 5" Wydawnictwo Solaris 2004)
- Chłopaki, wszyscy idziecie do piekła (antologia "PL +50. Historie przyszłości", Wydawnictwo Literackie 2004)
- Achaja – zaginiony rozdział ("Science Fiction" 5/2004)
- Wypasacz (antologia "Trupy Polskie", Wydawnictwo EMG, 2005)
- A jeśli to ja jestem Bogiem? ("Science Fiction" 10/2011)
- Siedem schodów (antologia "Miłość we Wrocławiu", Wydawnictwo EMG 2011)
- Pułapka Tesli ("Nowa Fantastyka" 11/2012)

== Sources ==
"Sigma" 101, 1978–1979
"Sigma" 120/121, 1980–1981
"Fantastyka" 2/1982 "Młody Technik" 4/1983
"Młody Technik" 11/1985
"Twórczość" 3-4/1997
"Nowa Fantastyka" 9/2001
"Nowa Fantastyka" 10-12/2002
"Nowa Fantastyka" 10-12/2003
"Science Fiction" 1/2001
"Science Fiction" 2/2001
"Science Fiction" 4/2001
"Science Fiction" 6/2001
"Science Fiction" 5/2002
"Science Fiction" 4/2003
"Science Fiction" 5/2004
