= Leszek Kraskowski =

Polish investigative journalist, publicist, and science fiction writer

- Born: 1967 (age 58–59)
- Occupations: Investigative journalist; science fiction writer
- Years active: 1984–present
- Known for: Investigations into the Polnord affair

Leszek Kraskowski (born 1967) is a Polish investigative journalist and science fiction writer.

== Career ==
Leszek Kraskowski was born in 1967. He made his debut with science-fiction stories in the Polish literary monthly "Fantastyka" in 1984–1988. They were also published by the Łódź social and literary weekly "Odgłosy" in 1984–1985. Kraskowski's short story entitled "Inspekcja", submitted to a literary competition organized by "Fantastyka", was distinguished and published in the anthology "Trzecia brama" in 1987.

Kraskowski made his debut as a journalist in 1990 in the Łódź supplement of "Gazeta Wyborcza". Then he published in the "Dziennik Łódzki". As an investigative journalist, he wrote for "Rzeczpospolita", "Wprost", "Dziennik" and "Super Express".

In 2000 he received the Polish Watergate Award of the Association of Polish Journalists (SDP), and in 2007 the Grand Press and MediaTory awards.

Leszek Kraskowski was primarily involved in investigative journalism concerning corruption, abuse of power, irregularities in public administration and the links between business and politics. In his reports, he also described economic and criminal scandals, including the behind-the-scenes computerization of the Social Insurance Institution (ZUS) by Prokom Software SA, the Corhydron scandal in Jelfa Pharmaceutical Company, and corruption surrounding the Polish State Railways (the Sensus Group scandal). He wrote on the Polnord scandal (development company), the activities of individuals involved in the case, and examined investigative materials concerning financial transfers and the conduct of state institutions.

Kraskowski was an advisor to the Minister of Infrastructure and Construction, Andrzej Adamczyk.
