= Achaja =

Three-part novel by Andrzej Ziemiański

Achaia
- Cover of first edition
- Author: Andrzej Ziemiański
- Illustrator: Dominik Broniek
- Cover artist: Piotr Cieśliński
- Language: Polish
- Series: Achaia
- Genre: Fantasy
- Publisher: Fabryka Słów
- Publication date: December 2002, November 2003, December 2004
- Publication place: Poland
- Media type: Print (Paperback)
- Pages: 624 pp (first volume); 558 pp (second volume); 416 pp (third volume)
- ISBN: 83-89011-05-0; 83-89011-33-6; 83-89011-25-5

Achaia is a Polish fantasy series of novels written by Andrzej Ziemiański, published in three volumes in 2002, 2003 and 2004 by the Fabryka Słów. The first two volumes received the Janusz A. Zajdel Award nomination (in 2002 and 2003, respectively); the second one received the Nautilus Award in 2004. All three volumes were reissued in 2011.

The Achaia series is written as a trilogy and the first three volumes are considered to be the first part of the trilogy. The second part of the trilogy is called Pomnik Cesarzowej Achai (The Monument of the Empress Achaia).

== Plot synopsis ==
Achaja is a firstborn daughter of one of the seven Great Dukes of Troy, Archentar. It is a Troy's tradition to have the first child sent to a military service in their youth. While most noble families manage to get their daughters out of this ordeal by temporary adopting some boys from lesser nobility, Archentar is manipulated by his young wife to actually send the princess off to the training. Soon after, her unit is dispatched to a battlefield and captured by the enemy forces of Luan. There, Achaja is to be used as a leverage to get back lands from Troy. Upon Archentar's diplomatic visit in Luan, the girl is tortured beneath his window so that the man could hear her screams before the negotiations over lands. As the man does not budge, she is made into a slave and sent to a labour camp to build a Royal Road. In order to survive, she takes a deal made by two experienced slaves to sell her body to them for protection. One of them, Hekke, turns out to have been a famous sword master before he disgraced himself and ended up as a slave. He teaches Achaja the craft. After a while, Achaja decides to try and run away from the camp despite the risk of terrible death if she is caught. Against all odds, she manages to succeed and starts her journey which will make her take on many different roles: a prostitute, a farmer girl and finally, a soldier instrumental in a war that will change the shape of the whole continent.

When Achaja is first introduced to the reader, she compares herself to a little girl of which she has been reading - alone in the woods and afraid of monsters. As her own story goes on, Achaja realises that she has now herself become a monster that little girls in the woods may be afraid of.

A wizard Meredith is visited by one of the gods, who tells him to slay the leader of The Order, a powerful religious organization that oversees this world. He attempts to fulfill the god's will, but fails and is captured by the Knights of the Order. He is sentenced to life in a dark, underground cell. Even though it is said that nobody can get into the cell once it is locked, the wizard is soon visited by Virus - a creature that claims to have neither a body nor a soul. Virus promises the man to help him accomplish what nobody ever did - to escape from the Order's prison.

Zaan is a highly intelligent scribe bored with the routine of everyday life. He dreams of becoming a legend, of making his mark in history and being remembered by generations to come. Yet his life passes monotonously. Until one day he meets Sirius, a young contract killer. Zaan is drawn to the adventurous life that Sirius leads and decides to become his companion. When the two men start talking, Sirius tells Zaan how as a child he was captured by pirates and made into a slave. He recounts that among other slaves on the ship, there was another boy his age - a long missing son of Great Duke Orion whose fate remained a mystery for years and was only known by Sirius. He and the prince befriended and the young royal told him many stories about Orion's court. One day, the pirate ship started leaking and everyone but Sirius died. Hearing the story, Zaan comes up with an idea to convince Orion that Sirius is in fact the missing prince. With his wit and knowledge, the man manages to get them into Orion's court and soon gains power that he could previously only dream of. Determined more than ever to get everything he ever wanted, Zaan wages a war against the whole world.
