= PL +50. Historie przyszłości =

Polish anthology

- Editor: Jacek Dukaj
- Language: Polish
- Genre: science fiction, future history
- Publisher: Wydawnictwo Literackie
- Publication date: 2004
- Publication place: Poland
- Media type: anthology

PL +50. Historie przyszłości (PL +50. Histories of the Future) is an anthology of Polish future history science fiction texts published in 2004 by Wydawnictwo Literackie, based on the concept by its editor, Jacek Dukaj.

== History ==
Jacek Dukaj invited contemporary Polish science fiction authors, as well as scientists and essayists, to write their visions of the near future of Poland in the year 2054. The volume contains both literary texts and essays.

The editor writes: "The stories follow one another in an order that moves from those depicting the most deformed reality, in caricatures of conventions and myths, to SF texts with a more realistic touch, and finally – almost photography, that is, non-fictional attempts to describe Poland +50 in the most serious way possible".

== List of works ==
- Jerzy Sosnowski – Autorewers (Auto-reverse)
- Cezary Domarus – Biała krew (White Blood)
- Andrzej Ziemiański – Chłopaki, wszyscy idziecie do piekła (Boys, You're All Going to Hell)
- Jacek Dukaj – Crux
- Tomasz Szczepański – Et in Arcadia ego baruim
- Tomasz Piątek – Gówniarze (Brats)
- Andrzej Zimniak – Kochać w Europie (To Love in Europe)
- Ryszard Kapuściński – Kultura narodowa w erze globalizacji (National Culture in the Era of Globalization)
- Maciej Dajnowski – Listy z Trytona (Letters from Triton)
- Bartłomiej Świderski – Łabędzi śpiew ministra dźwięku (The Swan Song of the Minister of Sound)
- Lech Jęczmyk – Oglądając się na minione pół wieku (Looking Back at the Last Half Century)
- Stanisław Lem – Orzeł biały na tle nerwowym (The White Eagle on a Nervous Background)
- Karol Maliszewski – Ostatnia poetka (The Last Poet)
- Zygmunt Bauman – Pięć przewidywań i mnóstwo zastrzeżeń (Five Predictions and Lots of Caveats)
- Jadwiga Staniszkis – Podwójna pętla (Double Loop)
- Olga Tokarczuk – Rubież (The Border)
- Maja Lidia Kossakowska – Serce wołu (The Heart of an Ox)
- Marek Oramus – Siódme niebo (Seventh Heaven)
- Daniel Odija – Spacer (The Walk)
- Edmund Wnuk-Lipiński – Struga czasu (Stream of Time)
- Jarosław Grzędowicz – Weekend w Spestreku (Weekend in Spestrek)
- Łukasz Orbitowski – Władca deszczu (Lord of the Rain)
- Maciej Żerdziński – Wyhoduj mnie, proszę (Grow Me, Please)

== Analysis and critique ==
Jacek Dukaj writes: "I tried to provide as broad an overview as possible of visions of future Poland, and if certain parts of the spectrum remain unfilled, that too provides information about the direction of our fears and hopes", adding, "I expected grim visions of the denationalization of Poland and cultural annexations [...] but the prevailing tone is one of reluctant acceptance of the inevitable: globalization in every sense of the word is unavoidable [...] the time for alarmist dystopias is over". He also notes certain formal tendencies: "authors less associated with science fiction express themselves in shorter forms, loosely tied to a plot; whereas true science fiction writers really enjoy spinning tales".

In the year the anthology was published, several reviews appeared. Wojciech Orliński wrote about the book as "the event of the year in Polish science fiction". He believed that the anthology was meant to celebrate Poland's entry into the European Union. However, he felt that the anthology was somewhat disappointing, mainly because "most of the authors, instead of imagining the future of Poland, wrote about the most contemporary Poland", as "they succumbed to the temptation to settle scores with what irritates them about the present under the pretext of writing about the future".

Agnieszka Dębska expressed the opinion that many texts in the anthology reflect "the awareness of the reduction of the legacy of the past", and that the cultural shape of the future worlds described "resembles a patchwork of elements from various traditions and cults". The reviewer from Czas Fantastyki noted that the stories present "the culture of the information age [...] in which the visual aspect plays the main role in communication", but this "dominance of the image, while perhaps broadening the perspective, simultaneously robs it of depth". Dębska points out that the texts contain many literary references, such as characters with surnames like Rzecki (The Doll), Stefan Szczuka and Maciej Chełmicki (Ashes and Diamonds), Boryna (The Peasants), or Leśmian, yet this "name-dropping [...] remains a hollow game – it has no consequences for the stories being told". Like Orliński, Dębska observes that according to the authors, "the shape of culture in half a century will grow [...] from exaggerated aspects of the present".

Paweł Dunin-Wąsowicz states in Przekrój that "optimism grows with the age of the authors. The younger ones paint grim visions", while older creators believe that "the changes will not be so severe". He also confirms the impressions of other reviewers that "the one-dimensionality of many authors' texts is disheartening. Most young science fiction writers took the easy way out", and "the texts where literature triumphs over tendentious journalism are, unfortunately, in the minority". Dunin-Wąsowicz singles out Olga Tokarczuk's story for praise.

The Sprawy Nauki bulletin of the State Committee for Scientific Research also published a review. Romuald Karyś noted that he was discussing the book only because it contained texts by well-known and respected scientists and leading publicists, and he focused solely on these essays (by Staniszkis, Bauman, Wnuk-Lipiński, Lem). Karyś doubts the futurological value of the anthology, stating that "the future beyond a 5–10 year horizon is completely unpredictable", but he believes the book is worth reading "not to learn about the future, but to become sensitive to contemporary phenomena".

Jan Rudziński harshly criticized the anthology in the bulletin of the Gdańsk Fantasy Club, writing that "most of the texts are clichés, stereotypes, and banalities, immersed in today's day, without a broader breath". He especially criticized the authors' inexplicable Polonocentrism.

Two years later, a reviewer from the Poltergeist portal concluded that the anthology "passed without much fanfare", despite the ambitious intentions. He believed that the decision to limit the period of the described future did a disservice to the texts, as "some reviewers showed surprisingly rigid attitudes in their criticism". He argued that "almost all of the works included are at least good", but criticized the stories by Tomasz Piątek ("a big mistake"), Karol Maliszewski ("somewhat incoherent"), Tomasz Odija ("a word game that has nothing to do with science fiction"), and Andrzej Ziemiański ("a display of sloppy writing [...] a story so immature it's laughable"). He praised the anthology's concept creator: "he did a great job [...] wrote a concise and wonderfully crafted introduction, added a great story of his own, and above all, organized the whole thing like an optical spectrum".

Maciej Parowski, several years later, was more forgiving in his assessments: "Dukaj emerged as an anthologist, creator, and executor of the impressive volume PL +50. He invited not only the best science fiction writers but also the best of Polish thinkers to stretch their imaginations fifty years into the future. He and Łukasz Orbitowski had the best stories in the volume". He also mentioned the participation of the dean of Polish science fiction: "Stanisław Lem, although he avoided contact with Polish science fiction writers, appeared in Dukaj's anthology PL +50, because he was told at Wydawnictwo Literackie that Dukaj was no ordinary writer".
