= Chołod =

2022 novel by Szczepan Twardoch

- Author: Szczepan Twardoch
- Language: Polish
- Publisher: Wydawnictwo Literackie
- Publication date: 26 October 2022
- ISBN: 978-83-080-7682-8

Chołod is a novel written by Szczepan Twardoch and published in 2022 by Wydawnictwo Literackie in book and e-book form.

== Plot ==
Chołod is named after a settlement in the far north, inhabited by a small community living according to its own laws, isolated from civilization. A Silesian, Konrad Widuch, fleeing a Soviet gulag, settles there and describes his stay in Chołod and his earlier turbulent and dramatic fate in his memoirs. In a mysterious way, the memoirs find their way to the author of the book, who reconstructs them and explains how they came into his hands.

== Reception ==
Chołod received favourable reviews. Marcin Belza of Kultura Liberalna praised the book, noting that "this is a novel that doesn't think for us" and that "plays out the themes of identity in a virtuoso way". On Forbes it was noted that Chołod is an attempt to get to the meaning of history. It has also been widely covered by other Polish language media. It has been nominated for the Empik Bestsellers 2022 in the categories of fiction and audio superfiction and Lubimyczytać.pl Book of the Year 2022 in the category of historical novel.
