= Szczepan Twardoch =

Silesian writer (born 1979)

- Szczepōn Twardoch
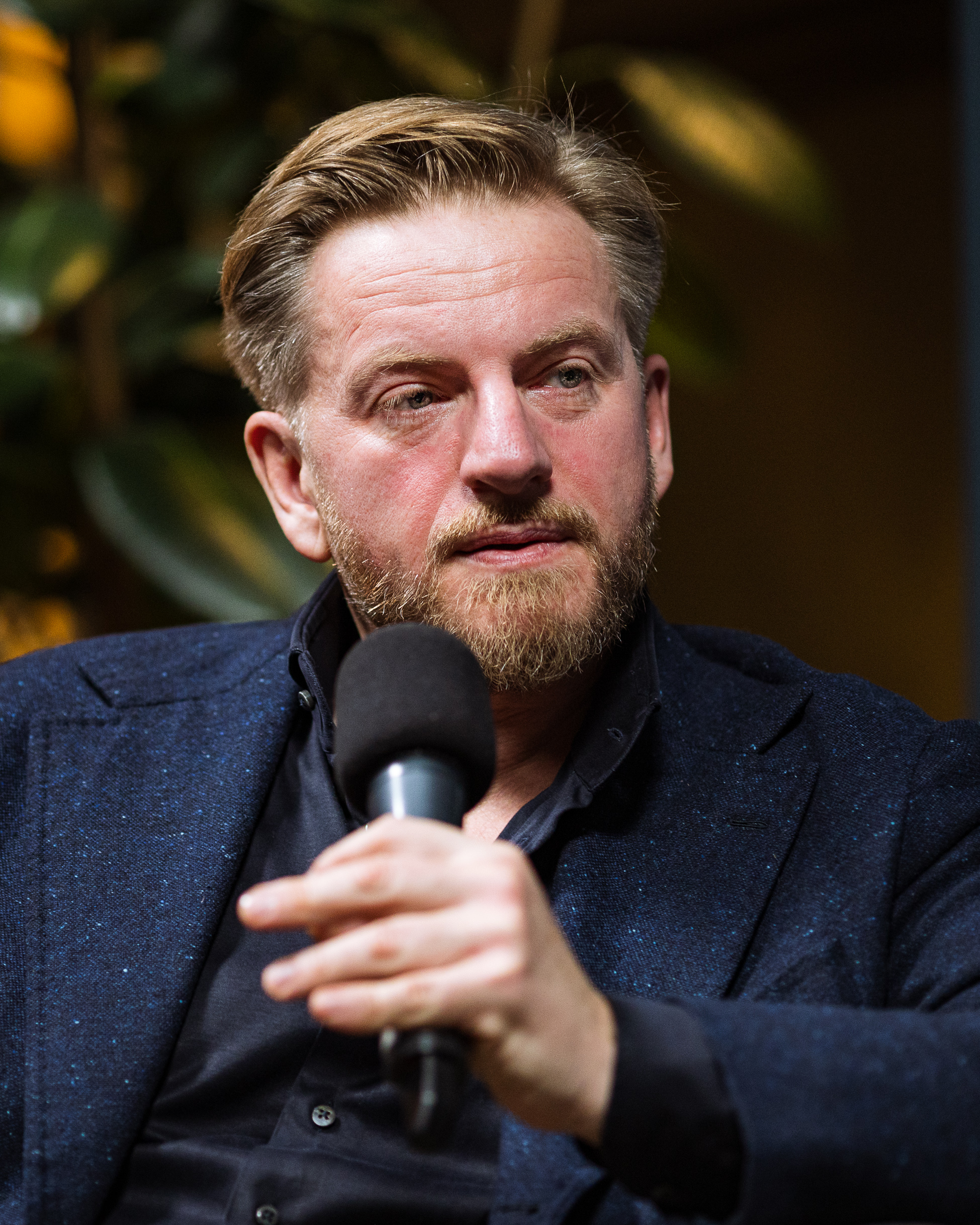
- Twardoch in 2024
- Born: 23 December 1979 (age 46); Knurów, Katowice Voivodeship Polish People's Republic
- Education: University of Silesia in Katowice
- Occupation: Novelist
- Writing career
- Language: Polish, Silesian
- Period: 2005–present
- Notable awards: Paszport Polityki (2012); Nike Audience Award (2013); Brücke Berlin-Preis (2016); EBRD Literature Prize (2021); Usedom Literature Prize (2025); Nike Award (2026)

Szczepan Lech Twardoch ([ʂt͡ʂɛpan tvardɔx]; born 23 December 1979 in Knurów) is a Polish writer. He has written a series of best-selling novels such as Morphine (2012), Drach (2014), The King (2016), The Kingdom (2018), Pokora (2020) and Null (2025).

The King has been turned into a TV series, first broadcast on the Canal+ network. He has won numerous literary prizes among them the Nike Award, EBRD Literature Prize, Brücke Berlin Literary Prize and Usedom Literature Prize.

== Career ==
Twardoch completed his education in sociology at the Interdepartmental Individual Studies in the Humanities of University of Silesia in Katowice.

As an independent journalist, Twardoch's work has appeared in various publications including Gazeta Wyborcza, and Rzeczpospolita. He served as the editor of the literary section for the bimonthly magazine Christianitas and has been a regular columnist for Polityka and Wysokie Obcasy Extra.

Twardoch's literary career is marked by several accolades. His short story The Madness of Rotmistrz von Egern was a contender for the Nautilus Prize in 2003, securing fourth place. He won the Nautilus for the best short story of 2006 with Rondo, and in 2008, his Epiphany of Vicar Trzaska earned the Silver Award of the Jerzy Żuławski Literary Award. His novel Wieczny Grunwald received the Distinction of the Józef Mackiewicz Award in 2011. The following year, he was nominated for the Gdynia Literary Prize for his collection Tak jest dobrze. His novel Morphine won him the Polityka's Passport for 2012 but was also a finalist for the 2013 Nike Literary Award and received further nominations that year.

In 2014, Twardoch published Drach, which was shortlisted for the 2015 Nike Literary Award and won the 2016 German Brücke Berlin Literary Prize. The Koscielski Foundation Prize was awarded to him in 2015. He received the top prize in the "O!lśnienie 2016" poll in the Literature category, organized by Onet.pl in April 2017. His novel King was nominated for the 2017 Gdynia Literary Prize. In 2019, he was the recipient of the Samuel Bogumil Linde Prize.

Noteworthy is the adaptation of Twardoch's work into plays and television, including the 2018 stage premiere of King, directed by Monika Strzępka, and the series The King of Warsaw produced for Canal+ in 2019, in which Twardoch made a cameo appearance. Other adaptations include Drach, Pokora, and Bull, directed by Robert Talarczyk.

In February 2022, he was honored with the Kazimierz Kutz Award, and in November 2023, Twardoch received the Planet Lem Award for his innovative thinking about reality, celebrated alongside surpassing one million copies of his books sold.

Szczepan Twardoch's books, which include paper books, ebooks, and audio files, have collectively surpassed one million sales, with Król being his most popular novel. His work Drach has been translated into Silesian.

He lives in Pilchowice in Upper Silesia.

== Publications ==
=== Novels ===
- Sternberg, superNOWA 2007
- Epifania wikarego Trzaski, Wydawnictwo Dolnośląskie 2007
- Przemienienie, Wydawnictwo Dębogóra 2008
- Zimne wybrzeża, Wydawnictwo Dolnośląskie 2009
- Wieczny Grunwald: powieść zza końca czasów, Narodowe Centrum Kultury 2010 (Wydawnictwo Literackie 2013, 2017, 2019, 2021)
- Morfina, Wydawnictwo Literackie 2012
- Drach, Wydawnictwo Literackie 2014
- Król, Wydawnictwo Literackie 2016 (English translation The King of Warsaw by Sean Gasper Bye, 2020)
- Królestwo, Wydawnictwo Literackie 2018
- Pokora, Wydawnictwo Literackie 2020
- Chołod, Wydawnictwo Literackie 2022
- Powiedzmy, że Piontek, Wydawnictwo Literackie 2024
- Null, Wydawnictwo Marginesy 2025

=== Short story collections ===
- Obłęd rotmistrza von Egern, Fabryka Słów 2005
- Prawem wilka, superNOWA 2008
- Tak jest dobrze, Powergraph 2011
- Ballada o pewnej panience, Wydawnictwo Literackie 2017

== See also ==
- The King of Warsaw (TV series)
