= Wierzbanowa =

- Village
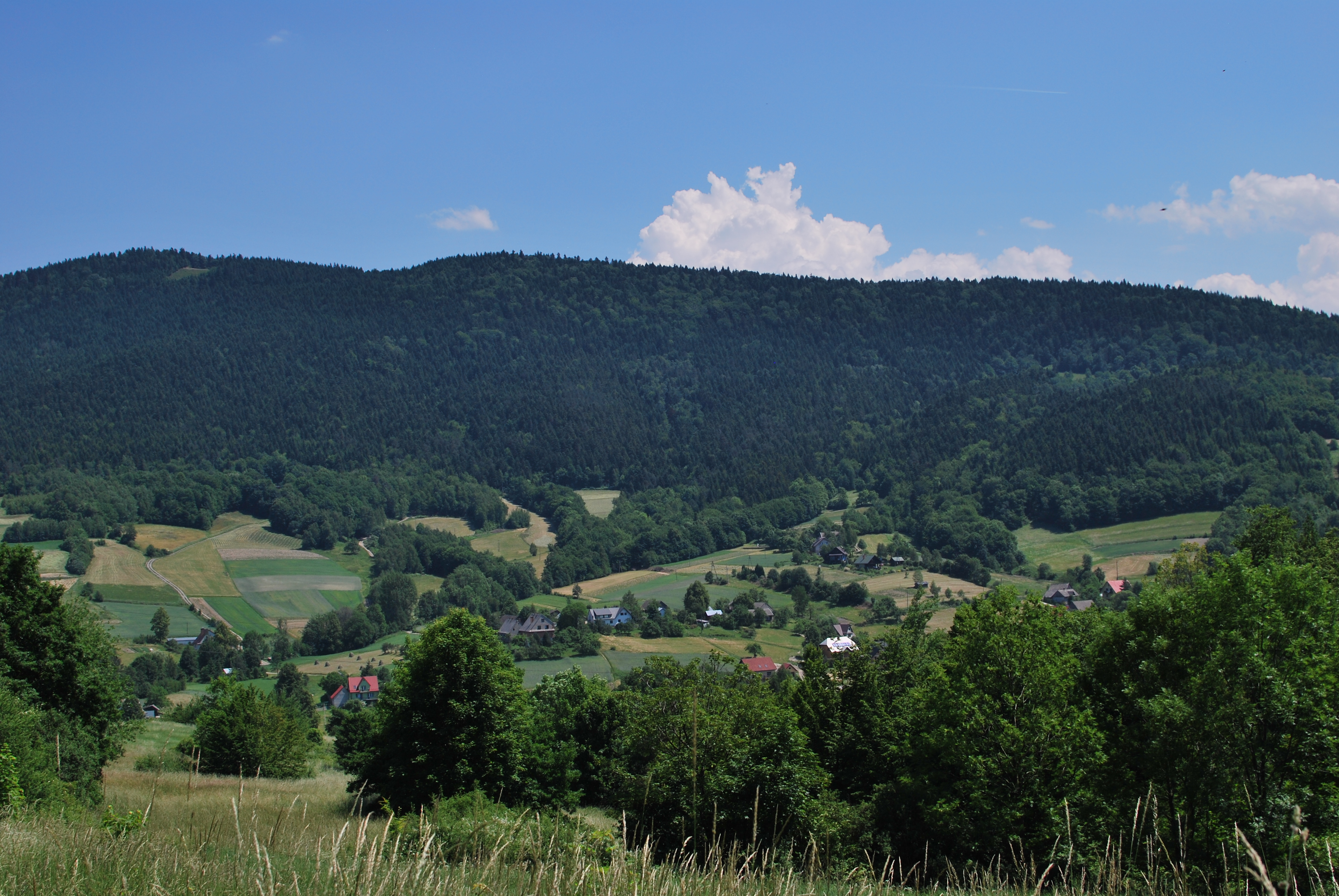

- Location within Poland
- Coordinates: 49°46′N 20°8′E
- Country: Poland
- Voivodeship: Lesser Poland
- County: Myślenice
- Gmina: Wiśniowa
- Elevation: 350 m (1,150 ft)
- Population: 600

Wierzbanowa [vjɛʐbaˈnɔva] is a village in the administrative district of Gmina Wiśniowa, within Myślenice County, Lesser Poland Voivodeship, in southern Poland.
