= Trzecia brama =

Polish anthology of short stories

- Editor: Maciej Parowski
- Language: Polish
- Genre: speculative fiction
- Published: 1987
- Publisher: Wydawnictwo Literackie
- Publication place: Poland
- Media type: anthology

Trzecia brama (The Third Gate) is an anthology of Polish speculative fiction short stories, published in 1987 as part of the Fantastyka polska series by Wydawnictwo Literackie. The collection features 15 texts selected by a five-member jury from 689 entries submitted to a contest held by the magazine Fantastyka. These stories represent a variety of voices from the emerging Polish science fiction scene between 1982 and 1983.

== Critique ==
According to Antoni Smuszkiewicz, this anthology "records the 'struggles of national imagination'" from the 1980s and represents the best works of its time as a result of the contest (rather than the decision of a single editor). He compares it to the anthology Posłanie z piątej planety (Message from the Fifth Planet) for the 1960s and Wołanie na Mlecznej Drodze (Call on the Milky Way) for the 1970s. Smuszkiewicz notes that this comparison illustrates the evolution of Polish science fiction beyond classical science fiction, while also critiquing it – subjectively – as representing a lower artistic level than that found in Wołanie na Mlecznej Drodze. He writes that Polish science fiction of the 1980s, of which this anthology is a good representation, has moved beyond mere contestation (and continuation), as within its conventions "anything goes". Thus, this anthology reflects the search for new forms of literary creativity.

Robert Klementowski states that the volume presents "works unafraid of linguistic experimentation; an ecological trend appears, alongside fantasy, with authors drawing inspiration from mysticism, surrealism, and romanticism".

In Posłowie (Afterword) by Maciej Parowski, he remarks: "This is both a representation and just a representation – certainly not the entirety. Some of the shortcomings of these stories are representative as well – such as the lack of respect for fine writing, something shared by the whole generation (...) [but also] their strengths: wide-ranging interests, reflective nature, ties to many currents of culture and literature, breaking away from the conventions of traditional science fiction, literary seriousness in dealing with real problems, and inventiveness. This prose, which at times feels less polished, less professional than what we’ve published in Fantastyka (...), nonetheless appears to be mature literature – literature with a face".

== Contents ==
I. Taki był początek (This Was the Beginning)

- Jerzy Strusiński – Bariera (The Barrier)
- Jacek Martynik – Okrąg czasu (Circle of Time)
- Dariusz Romanowski – Świat za szkłem (World Behind Glass)
- Leszek Kraskowski – Inspekcja (Inspection)
- Michał Szarzec – Taki był początek (This Was the Beginning)

II. Człowiek publiczny (Public Man)

1. Feliks W. Kres – Mag (Mage)
2. Marek Hemerling – Droga (The Path)
3. Grzegorz Stefański – Kawałek końca (A Piece of the End)
4. Andrzej Tuziak – Człowiek publiczny (Public Man)
5. Maciej Gałaszek – Manuał skazanego (Manual for the Condemned)

III. Trzecia brama (The Third Gate)

1. Marek Hemerling – Deneb III
2. Andrzej Augustynek – Atak (Attack)
3. Dariusz Tomasz Lebioda – Piloci ultrafioletowych dali (Pilots of the Ultraviolet Abyss)
4. Jan Wojewódzki – Dziedzictwo (Heritage)
5. Andrzej Bogusław Boryczko – Trzecia brama (The Third Gate)

== See also ==
- Polish science fiction
- Polish fantasy
- Speculative fiction
- Fantastyka (magazine)
- Wydawnictwo Literackie
