= Wydawnictwo Literackie =

Kraków-based Polish publishing house

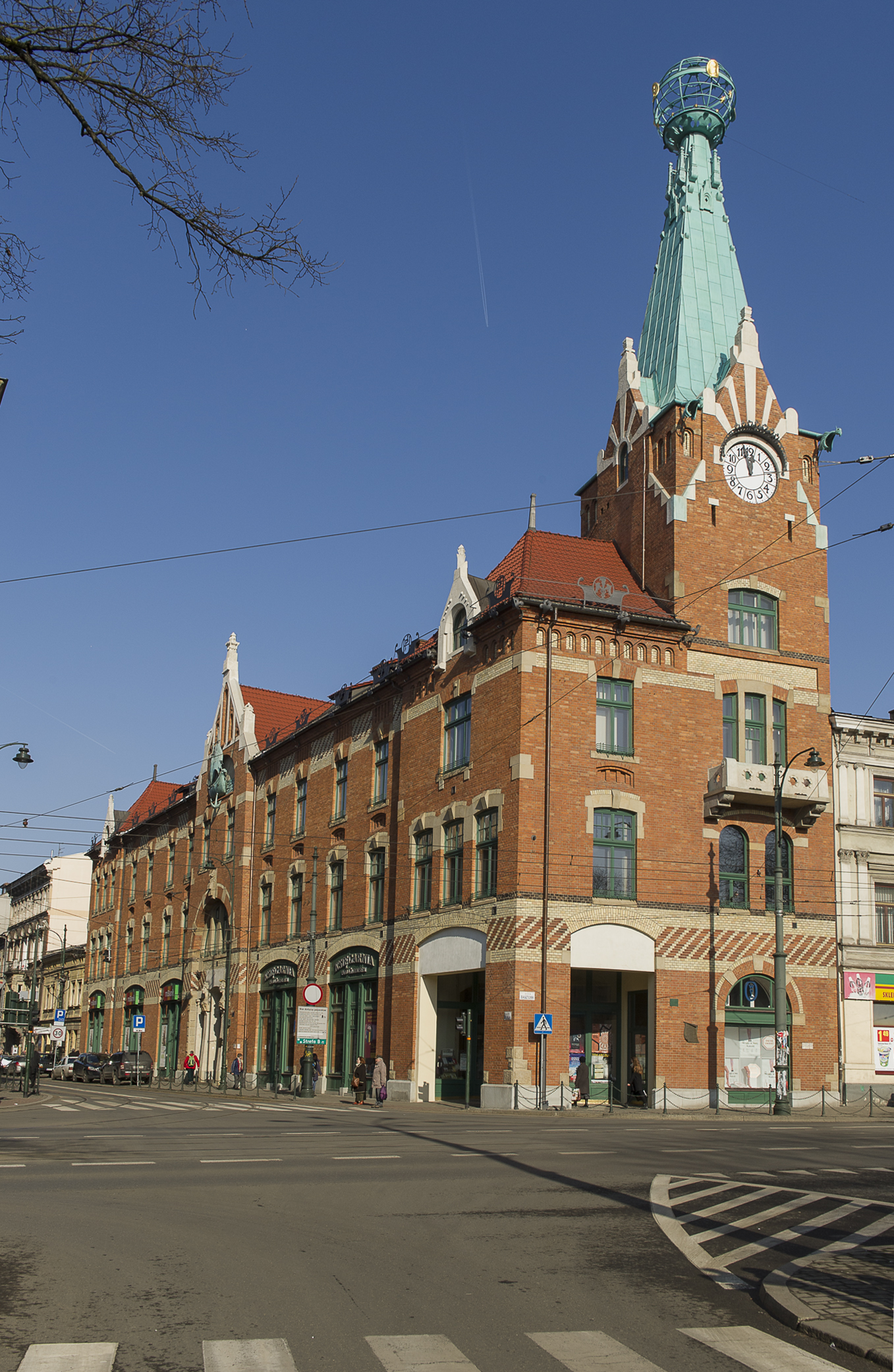
- Company headquarters at the Dom pod Globusem
- Type: Publishing House
- Founded: Kraków
- Headquarters: Kraków, Poland
- Products: Books
- Services: Publishing books
- Website: www.wydawnictwoliterackie.pl

Wydawnictwo Literackie (abbreviated WL, lit. "Literary Press") is a Kraków-based Polish publishing house, which has been referred to as one of Poland's "most respected".

== History ==
Since its foundation in 1953, Wydawnictwo Literackie has been focused on publishing modern prose and poetry by both renown and emerging authors, both Polish and foreign. In recent years it is primarily associated with editions of Polish language classics of the 20th century and of modern science-fiction novels. In recent years, the publishing house also expanded into the market of textbooks for humanities, lexicons and dictionaries. In 2002 the still state-owned publishing house was put up for sale as part of Poland's privatisation programme and was taken over by the Swiss-based publishing group Libella, headed by Vera Michalski-Hoffmann. Wydawnictwo Literackie remains part of Libella, alongside Oficyna Literacka Noir sur Blanc in Warsaw.

In 2019, the company was reported to have 44 employees and an annual turnover of "$13.78 million in sales".

The company headquarters is located in the Dom Pod Globusem building at 1 Długa Street, Krakow. A globe with the symbol of the company sits on the top of that building.

== Polish authors ==
Among the writers and poets associated with the publishing house are Nobel Prize winners Orhan Pamuk, Wisława Szymborska, Czesław Miłosz, Nadine Gordimer and Olga Tokarczuk. Other Polish authors whose works have been published by the Wydawnictwo Literackie (some of them for the first time, or for the first time in official print) include Janusz Anderman, Jacek Dukaj, Aleksander Fiut, Witold Gombrowicz, Stefan Grabiński, Zbigniew Herbert, Gustaw Herling-Grudziński, Marek S.Huberath, Maria Janion, Ryszard Kapuściński, Jan Kott, Stanisław Lem, Ewa Lipska, Jerzy Pilch, Tadeusz Różewicz, Jan Józef Szczepański, Szczepan Twardoch (including the Chołod), Jan Twardowski, Karol Wojtyła and Adam Zagajewski.

== Foreign authors ==
The printing house also publishes the Polish language editions of literary classics of English, German, Spanish and Russian-language literary worlds, including the works by Lisa Appignanesi, John Banville, Walter Benjamin, Thomas Bernhard, Jorge Luis Borges, Didier van Cauwelaert, Susanna Clarke, Eric-Emmanuel Schmitt, Hans Magnus Enzensberger, T.S.Eliot, Carlos Fuentes, Jason Goodwin, Nick Hornby, Ivan Klima, David Mitchell, Garth Nix, Ian Ogilvy, Bulat Okudzhava, Sylvia Plath, Octavio Paz, Matthew Pearl, Graham Swift, John Updike and Virginia Woolf.

== Book series ==
Title of the series in Polish / English translation of series title

- Biblioteka Klasyki Polskiej i Obcej (Library of Polish and Foreign Classics)
- Biblioteka Krakowska (Cracow Library)
- Biblioteka Poezji Młodej Polski (Young Poland Poetry Library)
- Biblioteka Romantyczna (Romantic Library)
- Biblioteka Studiów Literackich (Library of Literary Studies)
- Cykl Historii Polski (Polish History Series)
- Cracoviana (Cracoviana)
- Cykl wspomnień Żydów krakowskich (Memories of Krakow Jews series)
- Dziela stara seria (An Old Series Shared)
- Dziela: Witold Gombrowicz (Works of Witold Gombrowicz)
- Fantastyka i Groza (Fantasy and Horror)
- Fantastyka polska (Polish Fantasy)
- Historia i Zagadnienia Sztuki (History and Issues of Art)
- Lekcja Literatury (Literature Lesson)
- Leksykon Historii i Kultury Polskiej (Lexicon of Polish History and Culture)
- Listy Stanislawa Witkiewicza i jego korespondentow (Letters of Stanislaw Witkiewicz and his Correspondents)
- Literatura Iberyjska (Iberian Literature)
- Ludzie i Wydarzenia (People and Events)
- Monografie (Monographs)
- Monografie Historycznoliterackie (History and Literary Monographs)
- Obrazy Współczesności (Contemporary Pictures)
- Pamietniki i Wspomnienia (Diaries and Memories)
- Pisarze Języka Niemieckiego (German Language Writers)
- PL +50. Historie przyszłości (PL +50. Histories of the Future)
- Polskie Opowiadania Wspolczesne (Polish Contemporary Stories)
- Portrety Wielokrotne (Multiple Portraits)
- Proza Iberoamerykańska (Ibero-American Prose)
- Seria Dawnej Literatury Angielskiej (Early English Literature Series)
- Seria Dwujęzyczna (Bilingual Series)
- Seria Eseju Klasycznego (Classical Essay Series)
- Seria Klasyków Nowoczesnej Literatury (Series of Classics of Modern Literature)
- Seria Pary (Couples Series)
- Seria Tatrzańska (Tatrzańska Series)
- Skarbiec Polski (Treasury of Poland)
- Stanisław Lem poleca (Stanislaw Lem Recommends)
- Studia z Historii Doktryn (Studies in the History of Doctrines)
- Tadeusz Peiper: Pisma
- Wspomnienia oświęcimskie (Auschwitz Memories)
- Wspomnienia Pilota (Pilot's Memories)
- Wydawnictwa Muzeum Tatrzanskiego (Tatra Museum Publishing House)
- Z Dziel Juliusza Kaden-Bandrowskigo (From Juliusz Kaden-Bandrowski's Quarter)
- Z Klepsydrą (With an Hourglass)
- Z Materialow Pracowni Badania Sztuki Ludowej Instytutu Sztuki PAN (From the Material Studio of Folk Art Research of the Institute of Art of the Polish Academy of Sciences)
- Z Prac Muzeum Azji i Pacyfiku (From the Works of the Asia and Pacific Museum)
- Z Prac Zakladu Teatru Instyt (From the Works of the Theater Institute)
