= Trąby coat of arms =

Polish coat of arms

Trąby
- Battle cry: various
- Alternative names: Brzezina, Trąby II, Trąby Odmienne, Tuba
- Earliest mention: 1398 (seal), 1388 (record)
- Cities: Dukla, Jordanów, Krnov, Limanowa, Węgrów, Zakliczyn
- Gminas: Gmina Lubień, Gmina Nieborów, Gmina Przygodzice, Gmina Siepraw, Gmina Sławatycze, Gmina Tokarnia
- Families: 337 names A Amfor, Amforowicz, Anforowicz. B Baraniecki, Bendziński, Będziński, Bilman, Birżański, Błeszyński, Błędowski, Bolesławski, Brzezieński, Brzeziński. C Chaszajdarowicz, Chaszajewicz, Chleb, Chłopski, Chodzieński, Chwalczewski, Chwaleczewski, Chwaliszewski, Ciarnowski, Ciążyński, Ciborowski, Ciecicza, Cielica, Cieszeyko, Ciszkiewicz, Czarnowski, Czaszawski, Czaszyński, Czaśnicki. D Dadziwiłłowicz, Dadziwiłowicz, Dawidowicz, Dewicz, Dobek, Dobiński, Dobkiewicz, Dogel, Dogiel, Doliński, Dołuski, Dołuszycki, Dowgielt, Dowgiełt, Dowiakowski, Drombiński, Dumiński, Dusiacki, Dusiatski, Dusiątski, Dyaczkowski, Dzieczkowski, Dziewałtowski, Dzimitrowicz. F Falczewski. G Gabszewicz, Gaściewicz, Gaścilewicz, Gekowicz, Gintowicz, Gintowt, Gintowt-Dziewałtowski, Gnoiński, Gorski, Gorzkowski, Goszkowski, Gościewicz, Greczyna-Kierdej, Grobicki, Gruzdź, Gryczyn, Grydzewicz. H Hasiewicz, Hawryłło, Hleb, Horoch, Hościewicz, Hreczycha, Hreczyna-Kierdej, Hryczyn, Hryczyna, Hrydzewicz, Hrydziewicz. I Irzykowicz, Iskrzycki, Iwankiewicz, Iwaszkiewicz, Iwaszkowicz. J Jaksiński, Jałdybusz, Janakowski, Jardanowski, Jaskold, Jaskołd, Jaszkiewicz, Jaszkowicz, Jawoysz, Jonakowski, Jordan, Jordanowski, Juchnowicz, Jurhiewicz, Juriewicz, Jurjewicz, Jurowiec. K Kalina, Kalino, Karaszewicz, Karaś, Kielkiewicz, Kiełkiewicz, Kierdej, Kierklewski, Kirklewski, Kiryk, Klepacki, Klichnowski, Klichowski, Klimczycki, Kolecki, Koleński, Kolęcki, Koliński, Kołakowski, Kołek, Komajewski, Konkowski, Kosmowski, Kosowski, Koszajewski, Kowienicki, Kowinicki, Kowiński, Kownacki, Kownicki, Kowzan, Krakowka, Krakowko, Kramkowski, Krassuski, Krąkowski, Kronkowski, Krzykawski, Kumajewski, Kumanowski, Kumorowski, Kuryłowski. L Leonowicz, Lewkowski, Lewonowicz, Lutowieński. Ł Łąkorski, Łętowieński, Łoski, Łuczycki. M Małecki, Mażejko, Meer, Mejer, Meyer, Michniewski, Michniowski, Michnowski, Mickiewicz, Miekicki, Mielakowski, Miełakowski, Miękicki, Miękiski, Mikołajewicz, Milczycki, Milecki, Milęcki, Miłakowski, Mleczko, Możejko. N Narbut, Narbutowicz, Narbutt, Naskreniecki, Niewier, Niewodziński. O Ocicki, Oczycki, Odyniec, Ordyniec, Osiemborowski, Osowicki, Ossowicki, Ostaniewicz, Ostaszkiewicz, Ostrejko, Ostyk, Ostykowicz, Ostykowski, Oszczowski, Oszmieniec, Ościk, Ościkowicz, Ościkowski, Ośmiałowski, Ośniałowski, Ośniatkowski, Otffinowski, Otfinowski, Oticz, Otwinowski. P Pakoszewski, Pakoszowski, Pankiewicz, Pankowicz, Paszkiewicz, Petrusiewicz, Petruszewicz, Piecek, Pieckiewicz, Piećkiewicz, Piećko, Piekiewicz, Pieńkowski, Pietkiewicz, Pietrusewicz, Piętkiewicz, Piwka, Piwko, Piwnicki, Płowiański, Płowieński, Płowiński, Ponkiewicz, Pszonka. R Radziwiłł, Radziwiłłowicz, Radziwiłowicz, Rakiewicz, Rodowicz, Roguski, Rokosz, Romaszkiewicz, Rozwadowski, Rozwodowski, Rusanowski, Rusianowski, Rusinowski, Russagowski, Russanowski, Rykaczewski, Rzeczkowski. S Sadkowski, Sak-Pietkiewicz, Sawaniewicz, Serewicz, Sierewicz, Sierski, Siesicki, Sirewicz, Siwicki, Skrycki, Skulski, Sobocki, Sokoł, Sośnicki, Stanczykiewicz, Stanilewicz, Stanilewski, Stanisławowicz, Stańczyk, Stańczykiewicz, Stecher, Stojewski, Stojowski, Strzałka, Syrewicz, Syruć, Szalowski, Szczastny. Ś Światorzęcki, Świątorzecki, Świerczowski, Świerszowski, Świętochowski, Świętorzecki, Świętoszecki, Świrszczewski, Świrszczowski. T Tchorak, Tokaczewski, Tokar, Tokara, Tokarski, Tokarzewski, Trabsza, Trąba, Tromba, Trumbowicz, Truszowski. W Wachill, Wagłów, Walawski, Wartecki, Warzycki, Wieniarski, Wierszul, Wierszuł, Wierszułk, Wierzejski, Wiesicki, Wiktorynowicz, Wilam, Winarski, Wincza, Winiarski, Winicz, Wińcza, Włoczewski, Wnorowski, Wojna, Wojna-Jasieniecki, Wojniesz, Wojniusz, Wojno, Wojnowicz, Wolda, Wołk, Woyna, Woyno, Wrzescz, Wrzeszcz, Wyczołkowski, Wylam. Z Zbrawski, Zwiachelski, Zwiacholski. Ż Żagiel, Żagielewicz, Żebrawski, Żórawski, Żuk.

Trąby (Polish pronunciation: [ˈtrɔmbɨ], "Horns") is a Polish coat of arms. It was used by many szlachta (noble) families under the Kingdom of Poland and the Polish–Lithuanian Commonwealth.

== History ==
The origin of the horn motif lies in the extent of lands conceded being determined by the distance a horn could be heard in all directions.

== Blazon ==
Argent three bugle horns in triangle the mouthpieces conjoined in fess point Sable garnished, virolled and corded Or.

== Notable bearers ==
Notable bearers of this coat of arms have included:

- Prince Jan Karaszewicz-Tokarzewski (1885–1954) — Ukrainian diplomat and heraldry historian
- Kristinas Astikas
- Radvila Astikas
- Zbigniew Brzeziński
- Teodor Narbutt, historian, military engineer
- Radziwiłł family
- Tadeusz Jordan-Rozwadowski, Austrian & Polish General & Politician, first chief of the modern Polish General Staff 1918-1919 & 1920–1924, major contributor to victory at the Battle of Warsaw, one of the founders of the modern Polish state.
- Michał Karaszewicz-Tokarzewski
- Mikołaj Trąba
- Stanislav Skop (1492-1554) – was in 1527-1529 a Royal secretary and Skerstomon and Tendziagilski (Samogitia land, Taurage County) ruler (tiun, derzhavtsa). from the old princely dynasty of Dovsprungs. His wife was Princess Helena Andreevna Sangushko (1494–1561), son Hans Skopovny.
- Heorhiy Narbut (1886–1920) — Ukrainian graphic artist.

== Gallery ==
Variations

Adamowicz (odm.)

Bernatowicz (odm.)

Narbutt

Coat of arms of the Radziwiłł family. The family motto was "Bóg nam radzi" (God advises us)

Cities and villages

Alflen

Aitrach

Altheim

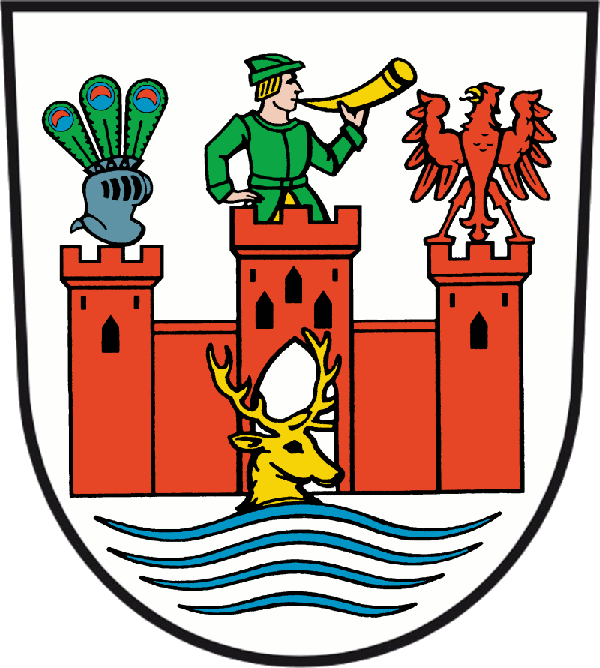
Angermünde

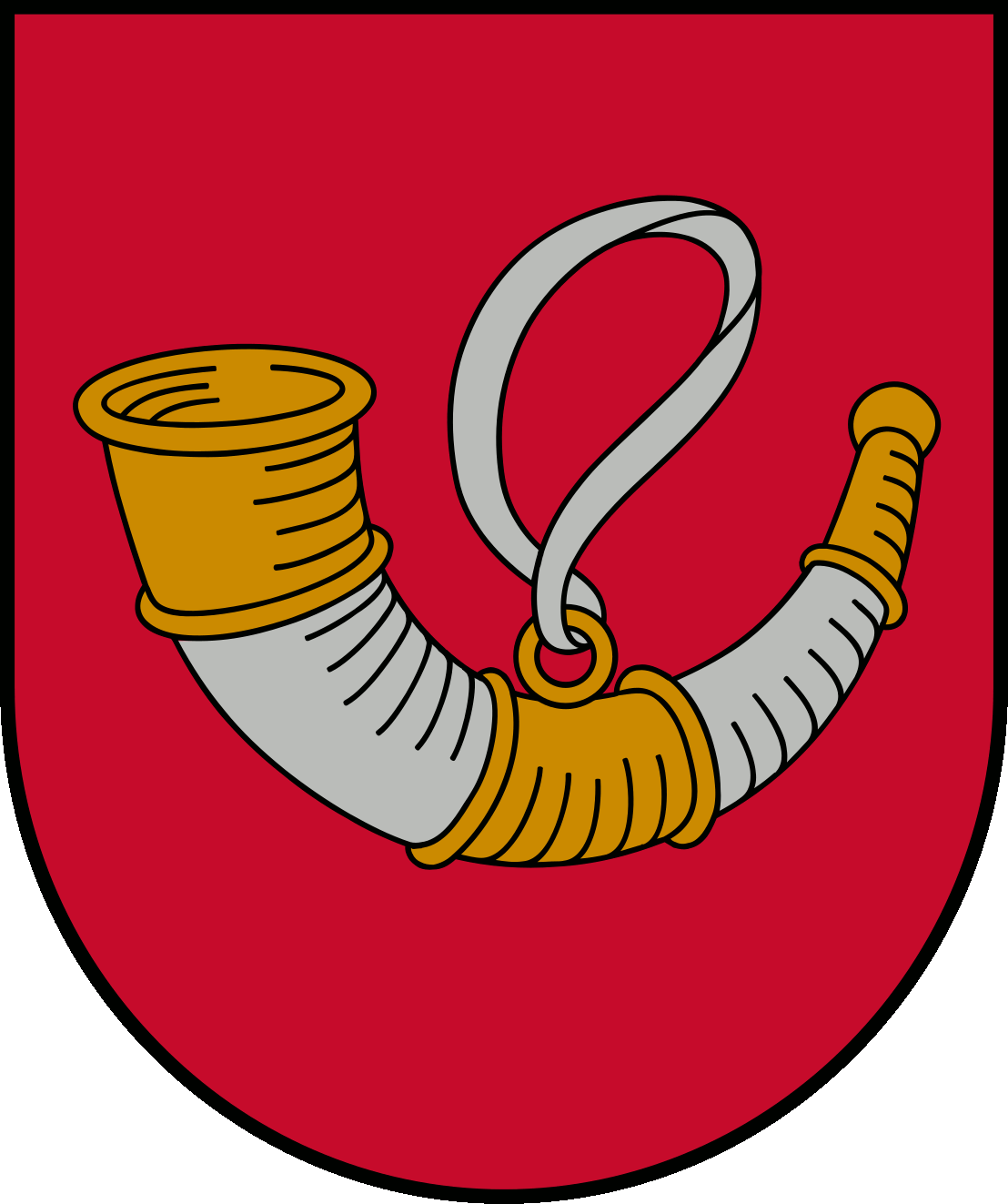
Auce Municipality

Bad Urach

Baiersdorf

Bedmar y Garcíez

Beilstein

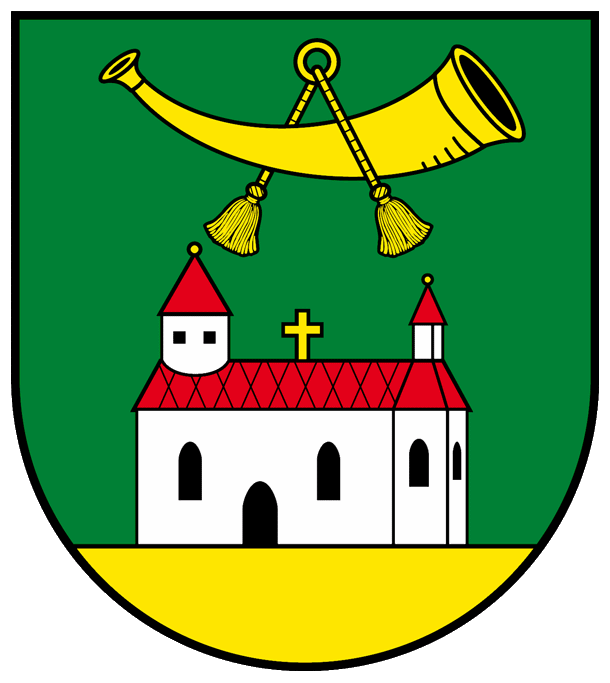
Belgern-Schildau

Blaustein

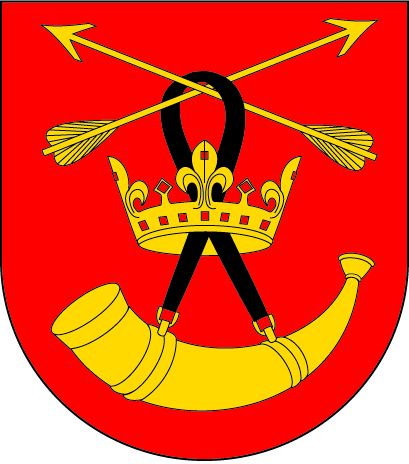
Gmina Bojanów

Braunshorn

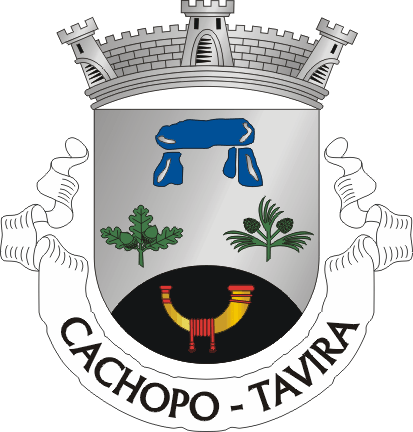
Cachopo

Čáslav

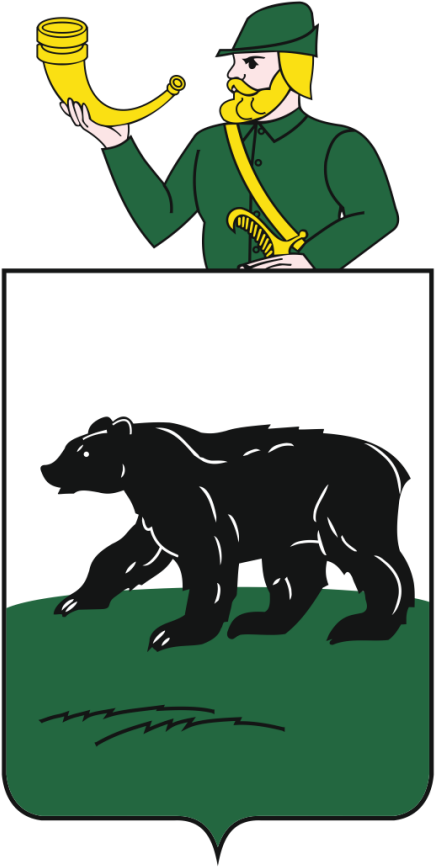
Chernyakhovsk

Chevagnes

Chrastava

Clichy

Cochem-Zell

Cornil

Courthézon

Cronheim

Dukla

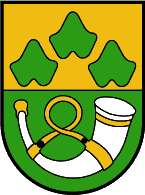
Düns

Dürnau

Ebringen

Eindhoven

Esslingen (district)

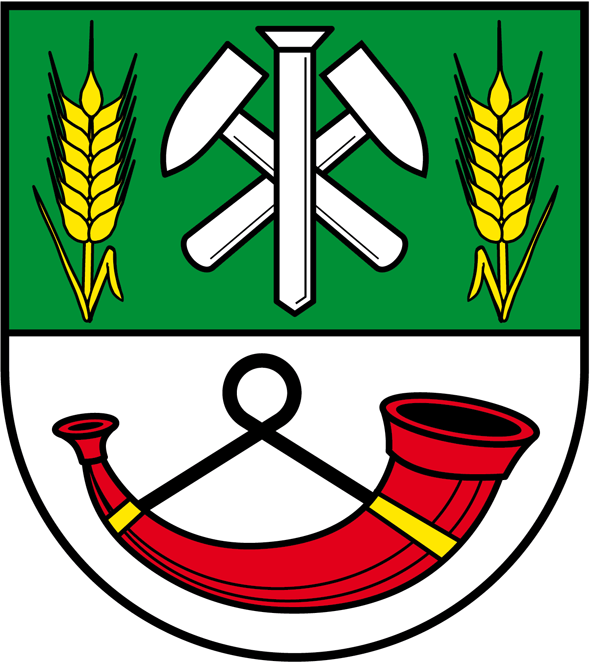
Falkenhain

Frastanz

Friedrichshafen

Gifhorn

Gifhorn (district)

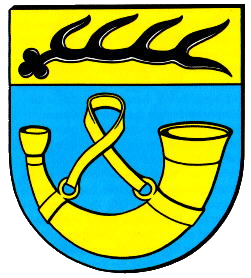
Gönningen

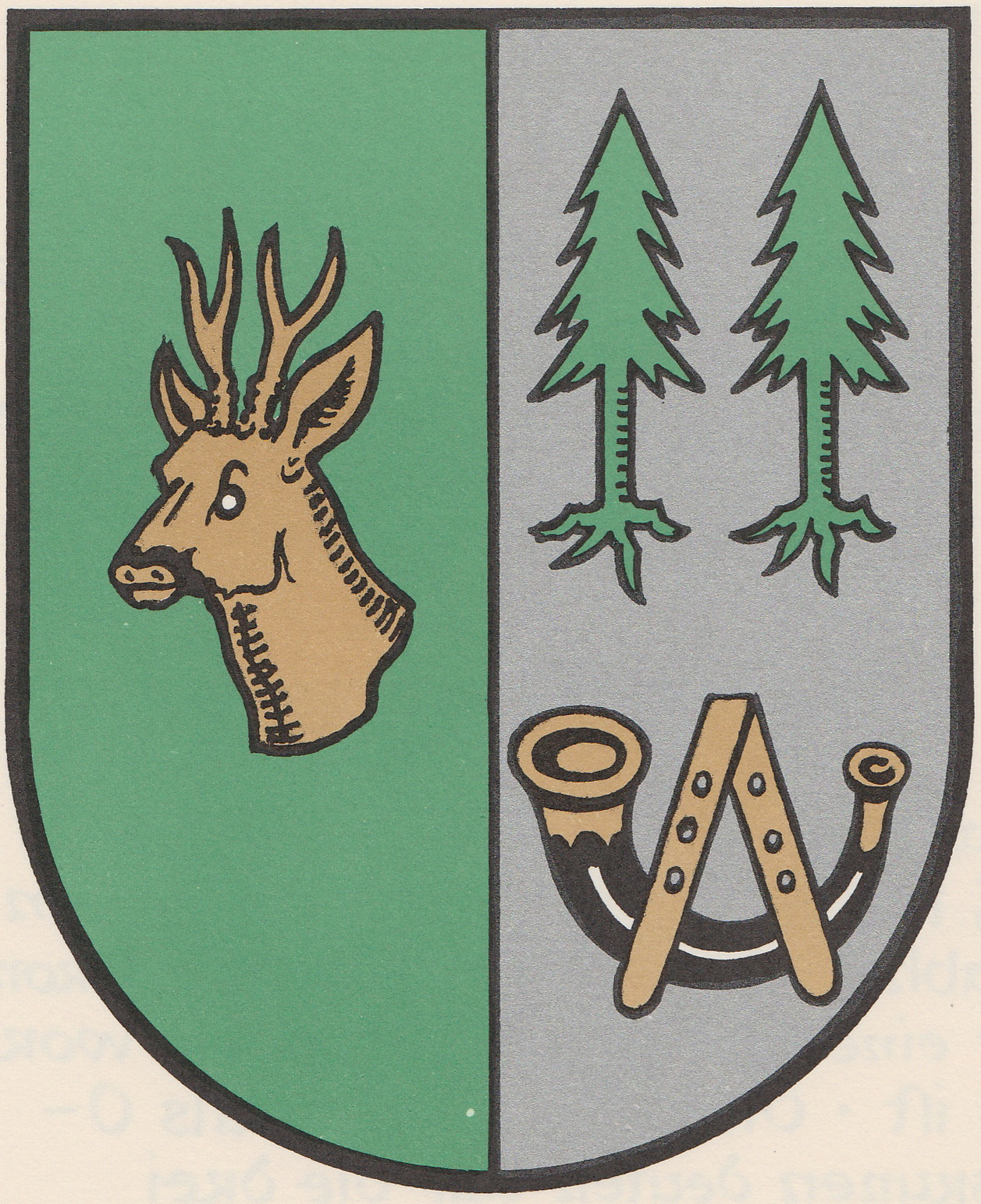
Harrendorf

Hażlach

Herrlingen

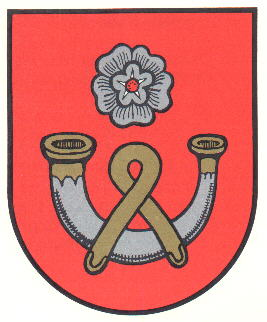
Hetthorn

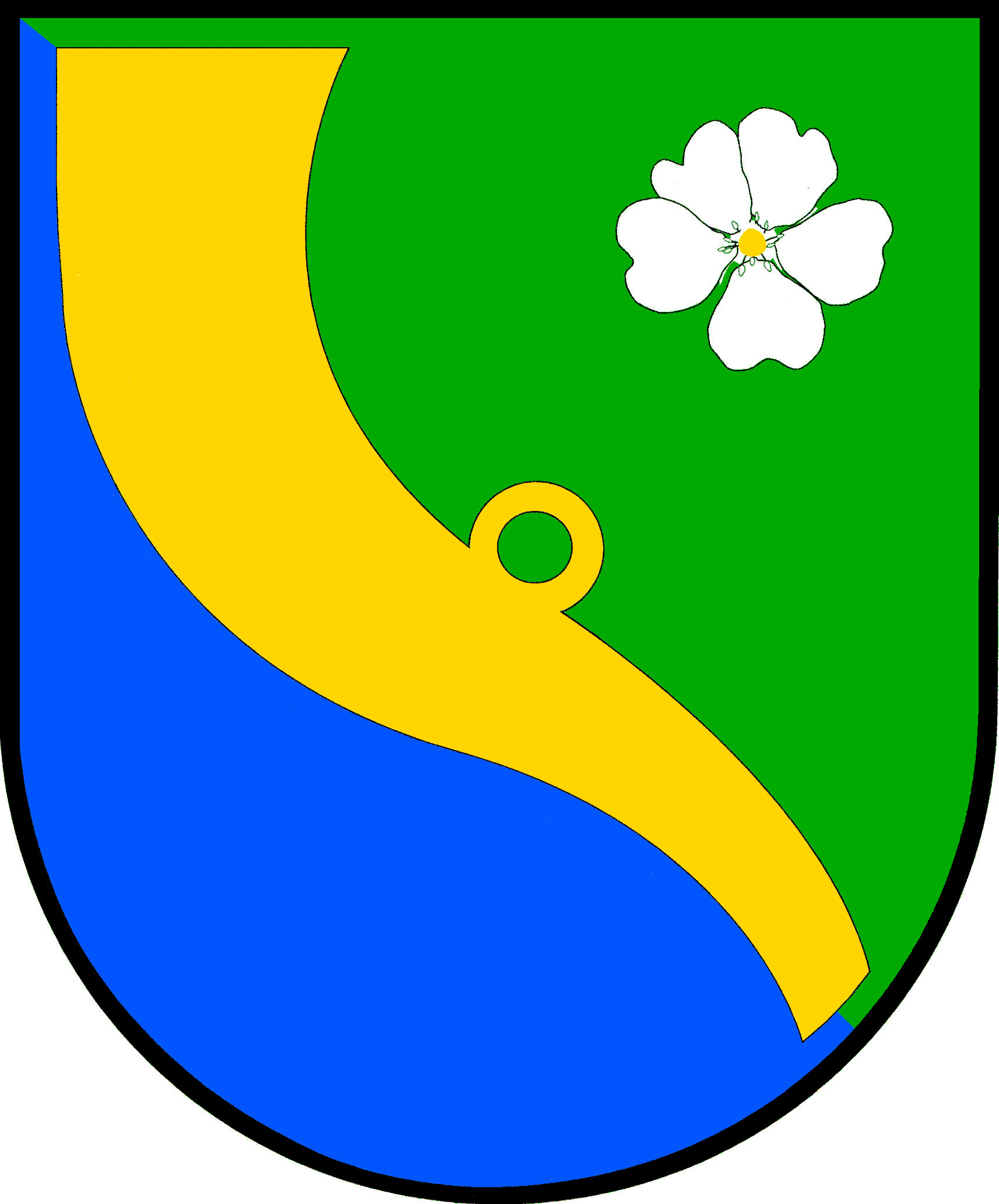
Hlásná Třebaň

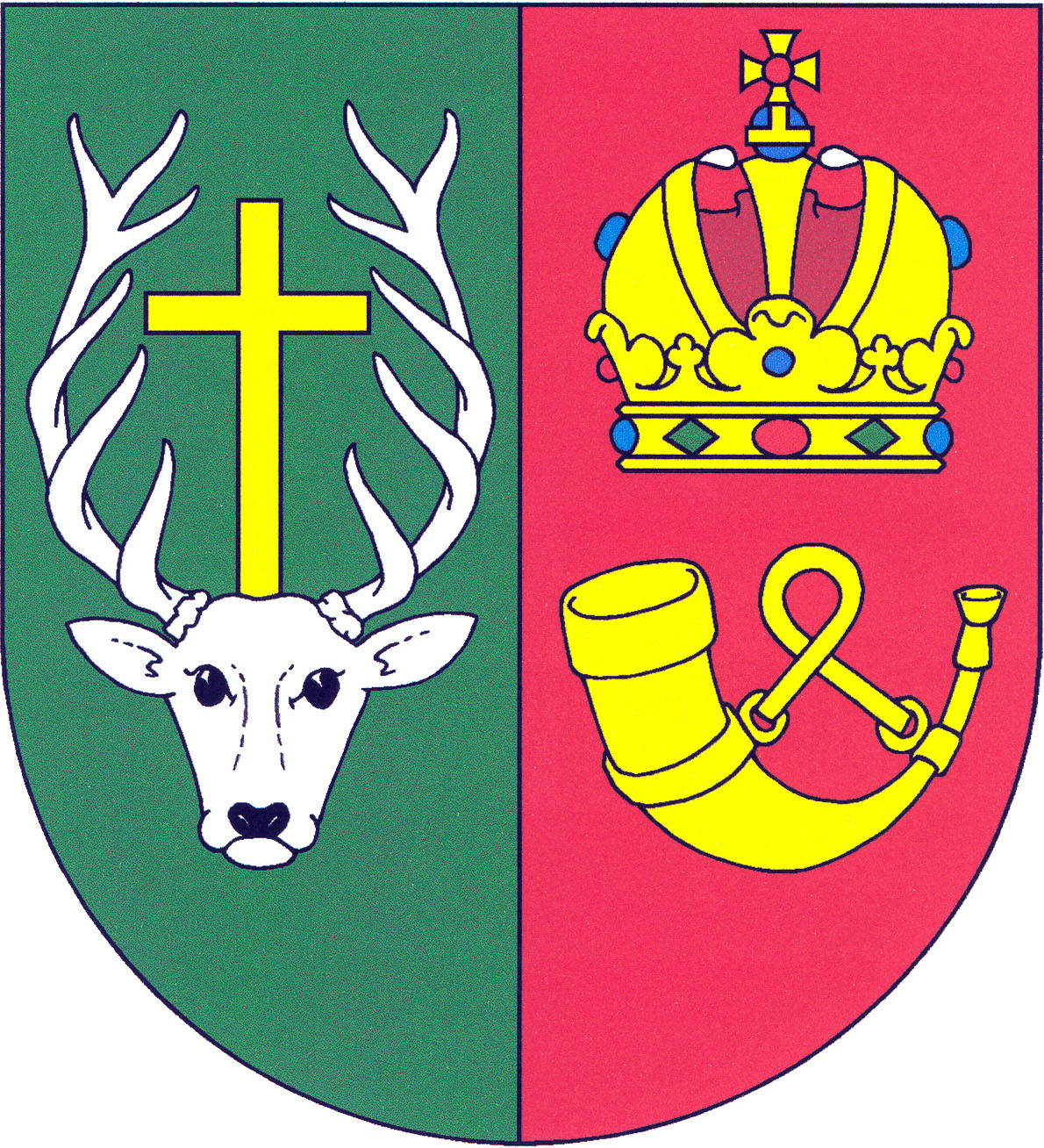
Hlavenec

Hoorn

Horn

Horn-Bad Meinberg

Hornberg

Horrheim

Hövelhof

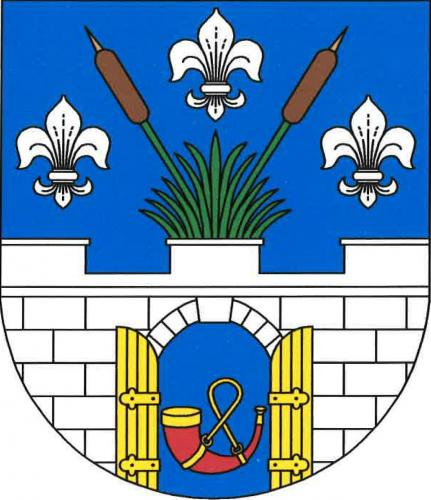
Hrádek nad Nisou

Jászárokszállás

Jászberény

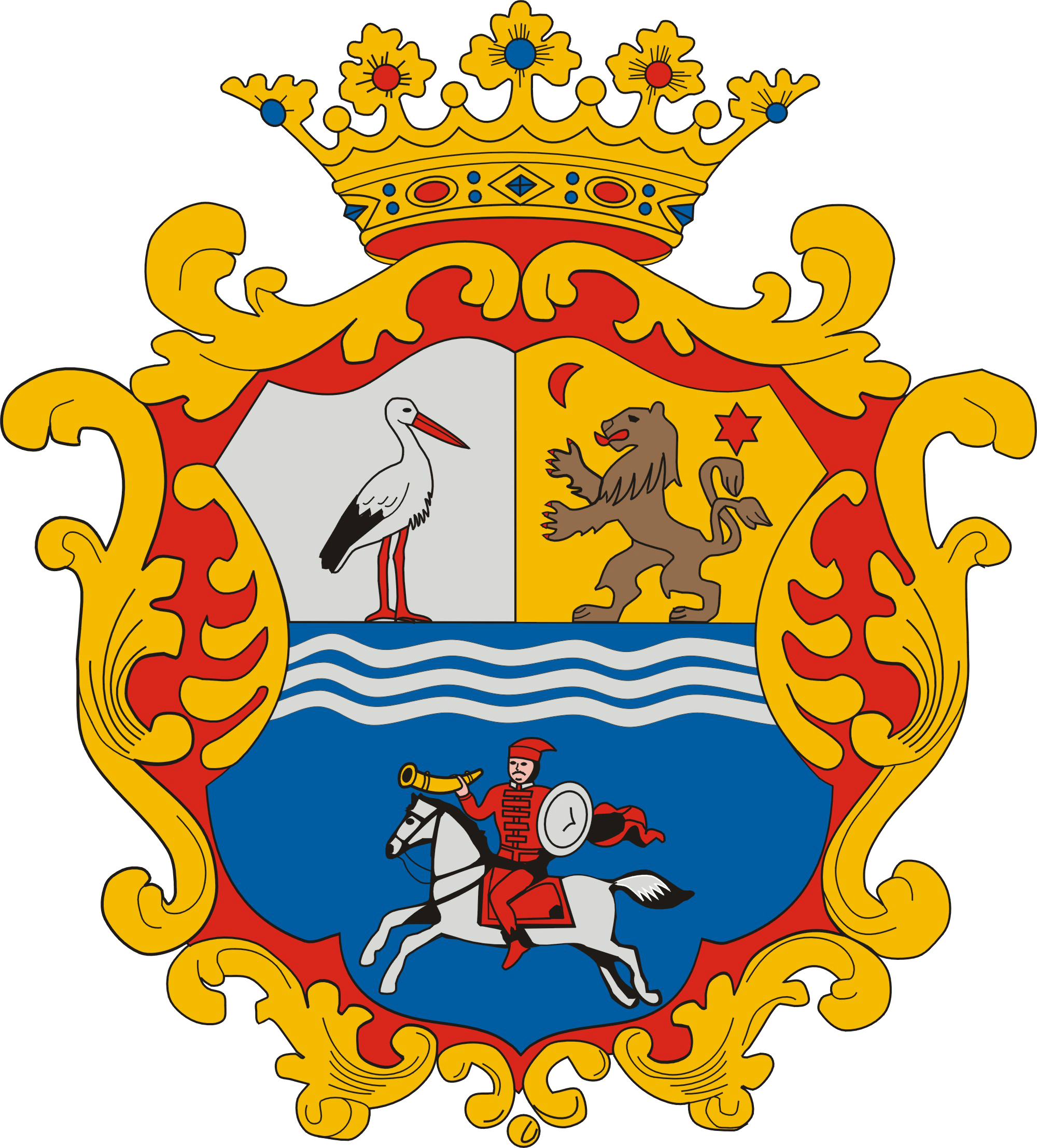
Jász-Nagykun-Szolnok County

Jiřetín pod Jedlovou

Jordanów

Kalisz

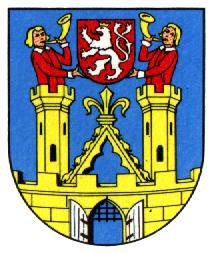
Kamenz

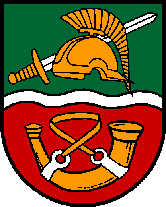
Kematen an der Krems

Kreuztal

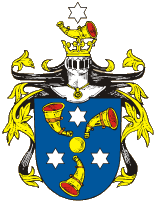
Krnov

Duchy of Krnov

Kapyl

Kletsk

Liechtenstein

Limanowa

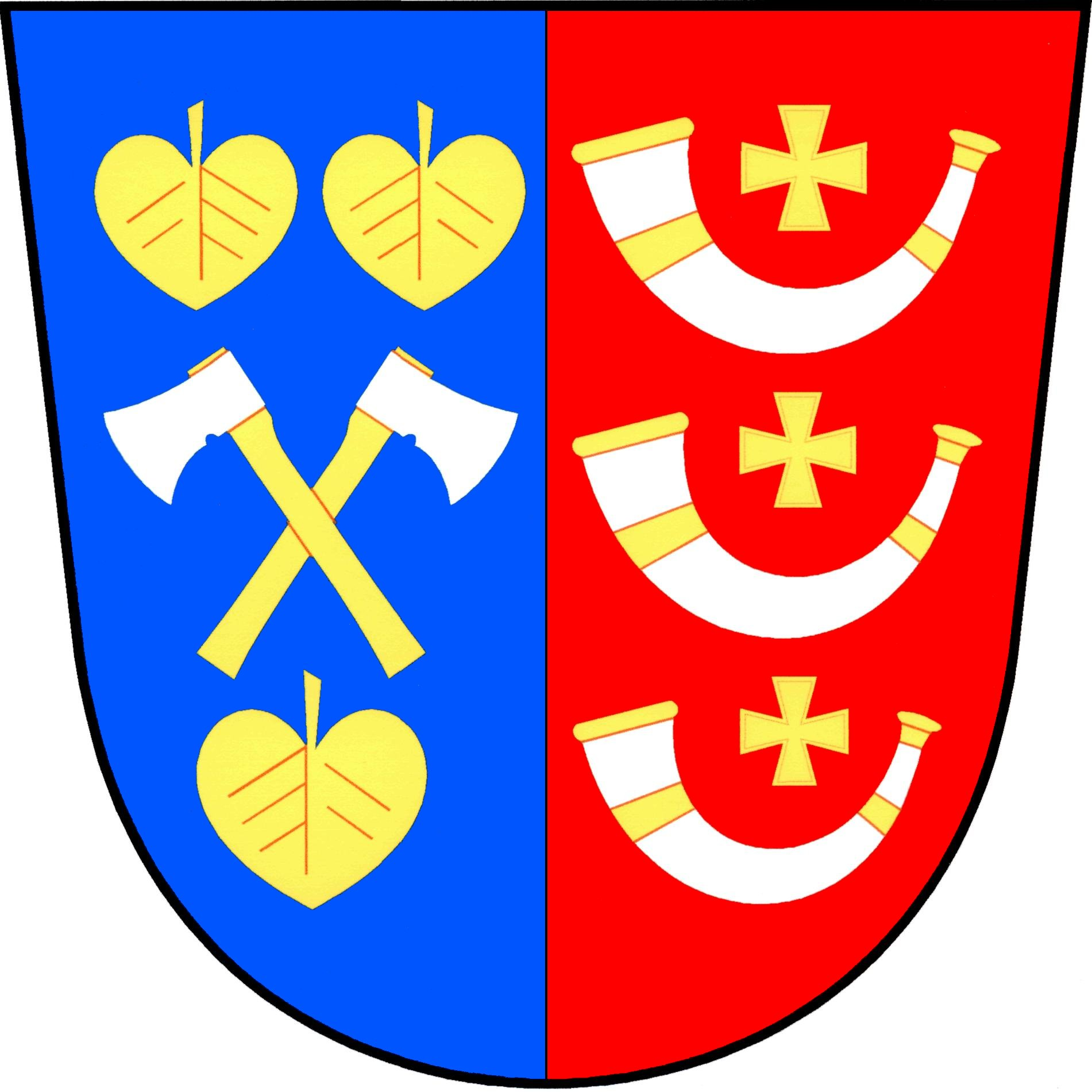
Lipová

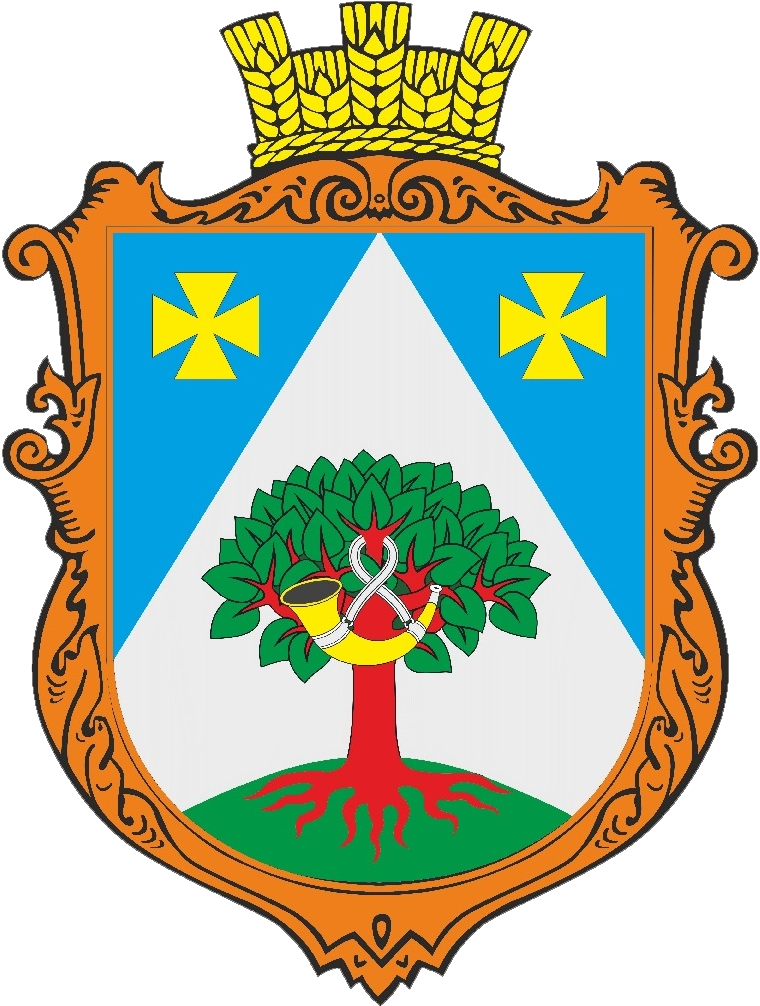
Lypiv Rih

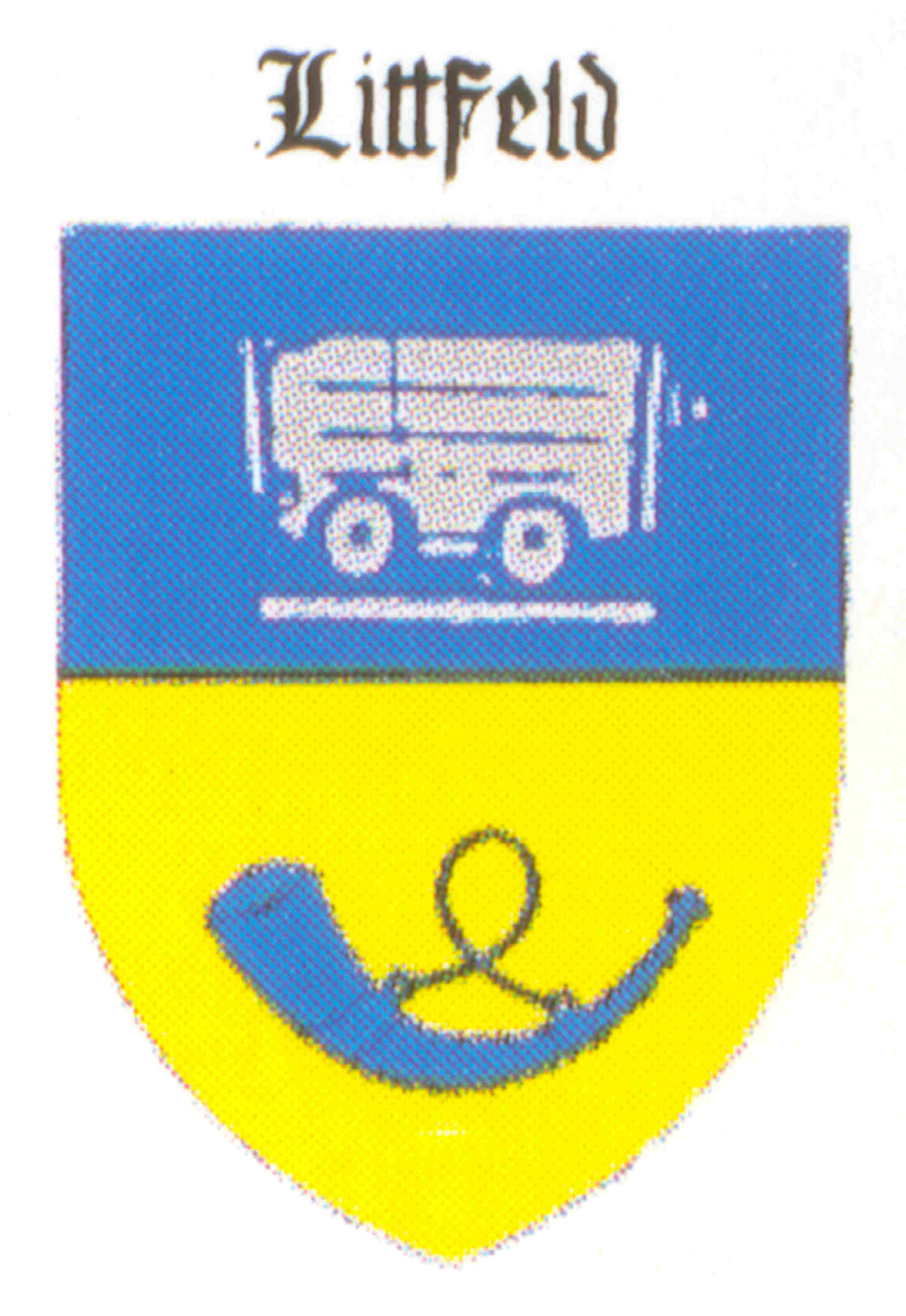
Littfeld

Lovčice

gmina Lubień

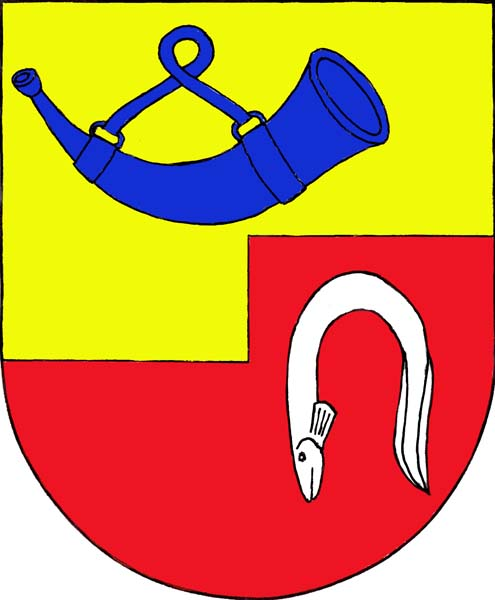
Lukavec u Hořic

Lutzhorn

Madulain

Murr

gmina Nieborów

Neuenkirchen-Vörden

Neuffen

Neu-Ulm

Neuweiler

Norath

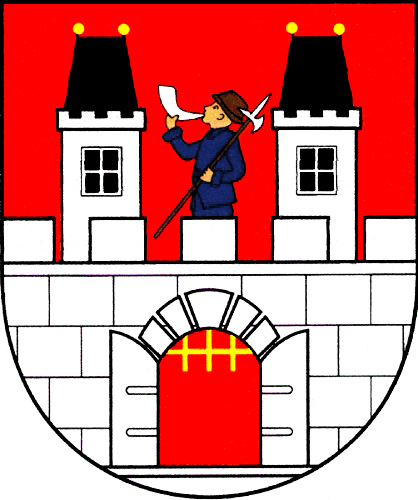
Nový Rychnov

Nürtingen

Principality of Orange

Ottmarsheim

Paray-Vieille-Poste

Písečná

Põhja-Sakala Parish

Połaniec

gmina Przygodzice

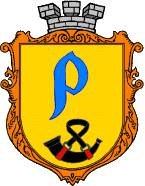
Radyvyliv

Rieden

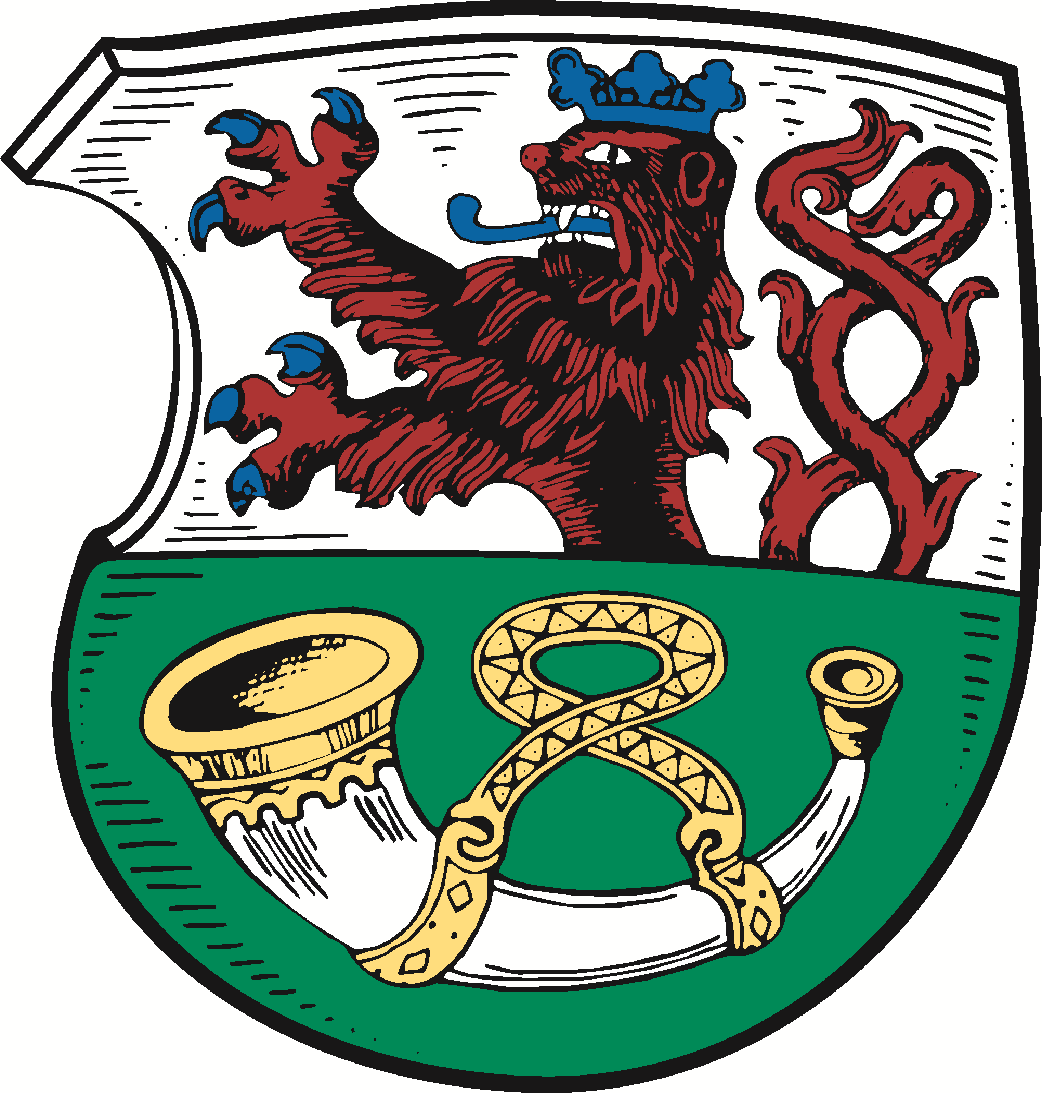
Rösrath

Rumburk

Scharmbeckstotel

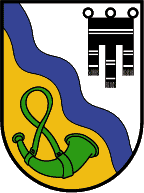
Schlins

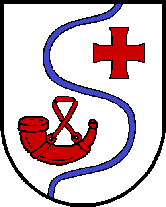
Senftenbach

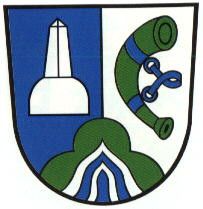
Siegmundsburg

gmina Siepraw

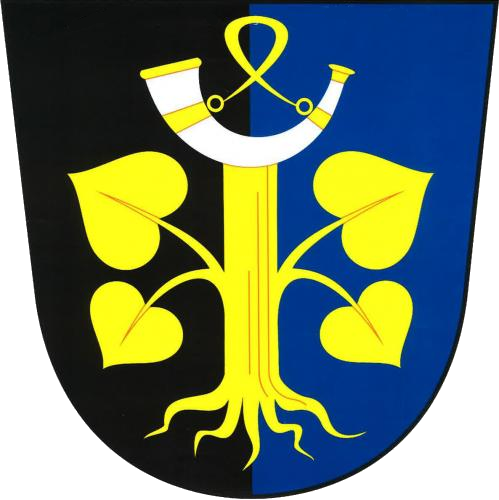
Skořenice

gmina Sławatycze

Smarhonʹ

Spiesheim

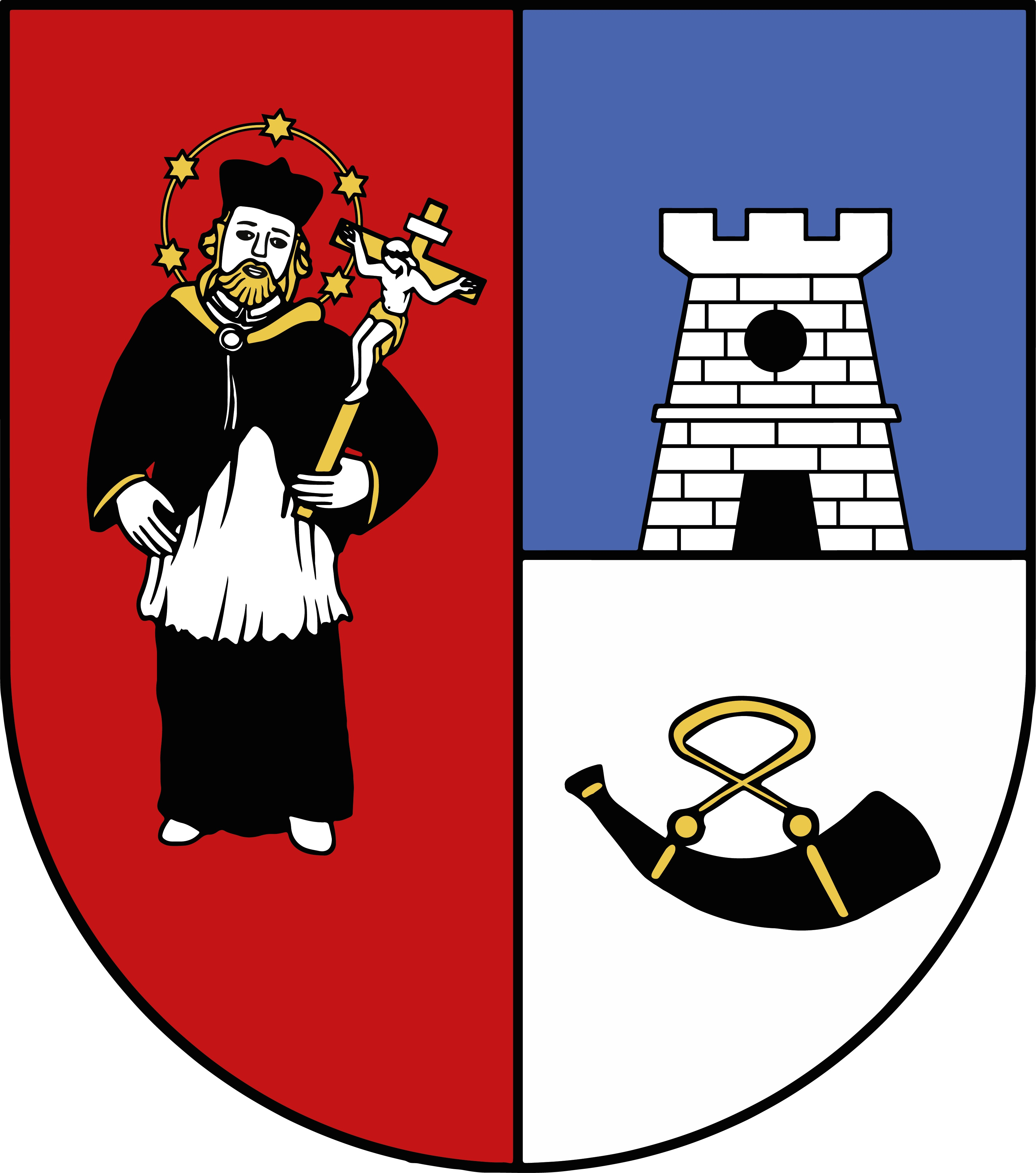
Sudslava

Tauragė

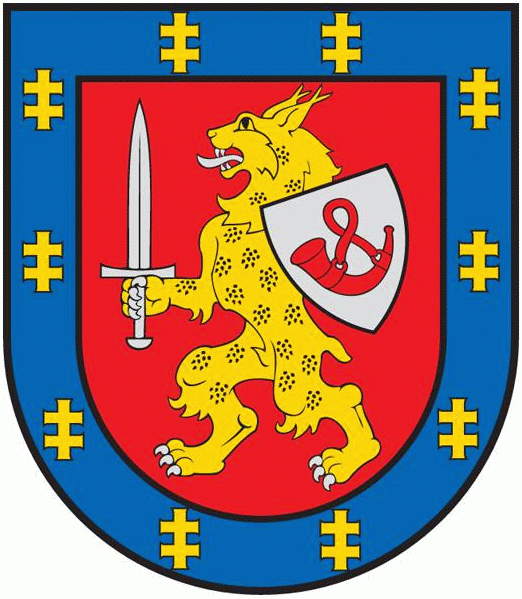
Tauragė County

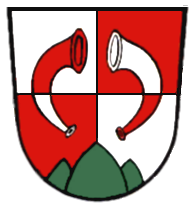
Triberg im Schwarzwald

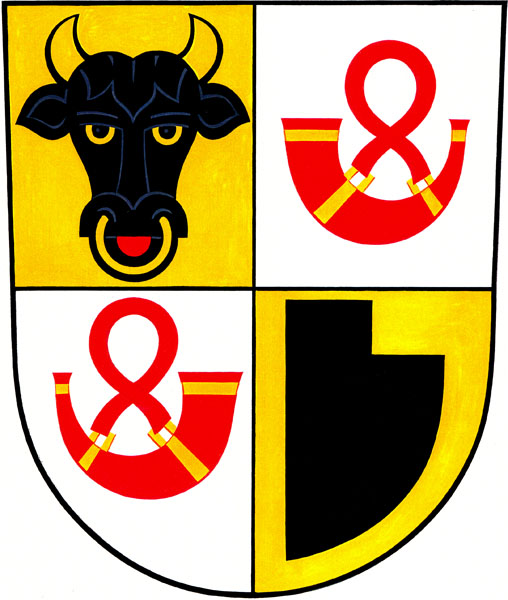
Troubky

Tychy

Vaucluse

Villefort

Vítkov

Wachstedt

Węgrów

Węgrów County

Westerhorn

Wildflecken

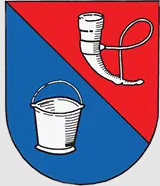
Winzendorf-Muthmannsdorf

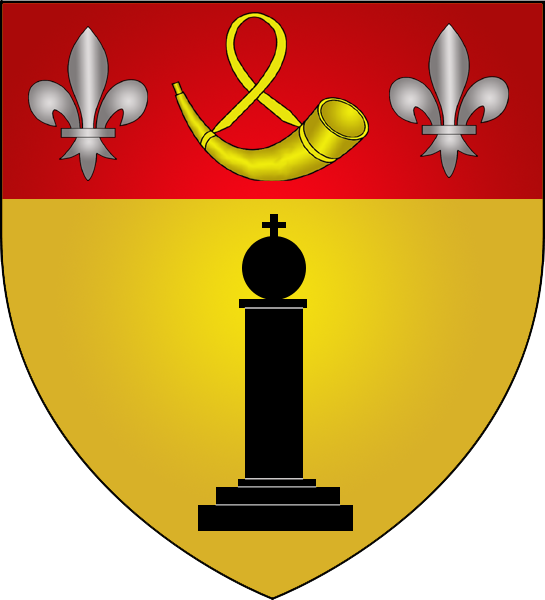
Wintger

Wolkenstein

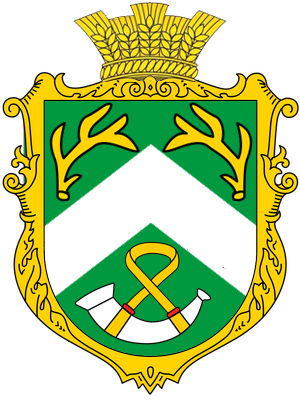
Zahorivka

Zakliczyn

Zhodzina

Other

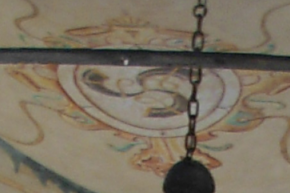
Traby coat of arms in Baranow-Sandomierski castle

Coat of arms of the BBC

== See also ==
- Polish heraldry
- Heraldic family
- List of Polish nobility coats of arms

== Bibliography ==
- Alfred Znamierowski: Herbarz rodowy. Warszawa: Świat Książki, 2004, s. 172. ISBN 83-7391-166-9.
- Tadeusz Gajl: Herbarz polski od średniowiecza do XX wieku : ponad 4500 herbów szlacheckich 37 tysięcy nazwisk 55 tysięcy rodów. L&L, 2007, s. 406–539. ISBN 978-83-60597-10-1.
