= Lovčice =

Lovčice may refer to places in the Czech Republic:

- Lovčice (Hodonín District), a municipality and village in the South Moravian Region
- Lovčice (Hradec Králové District), a municipality and village in the Hradec Králové Region
- Lovčice, a village and part of Bílé Podolí in the Central Bohemian Region
- Lovčice, a village and part of Kosova Hora in the Central Bohemian Region
- Lovčice, a village and part of Plánice in the Plzeň Region
