= Bohdan Osadchuk =

Ukrainian diaspora historian and journalist

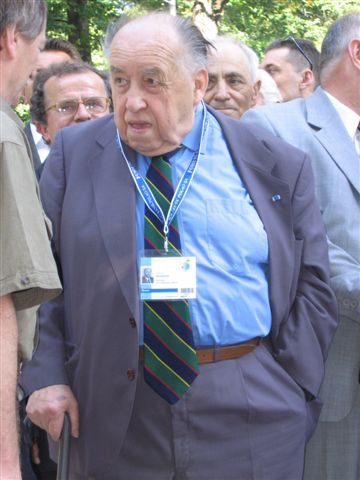
Osadchuk in 2005

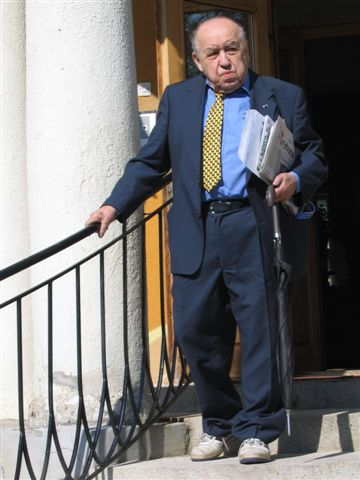
Osadchuk, Krynica-Zdrój (Poland), September 8, 2005

Bohdan Osadchuk (1 August 1920 – 19 October 2011) was a Ukrainian diaspora historian and journalist.

Osadchuk was born in Kolomyia. He was a professor at the Free University of Berlin, one of the most senior members of the Ukrainian Free University (UFU) of Munich, and a long-standing freelance writer for Kultura, a Polish emigre magazine published in Paris (editor Jerzy Giedroyc). In 2009 he was awarded a Bene Merito Honour medal by Foreign Minister Radosław Sikorski in recognition of scientific achievements and efforts to Polish-Ukrainian reconciliation.

He died in Czechówka near Myślenice situated in the Lesser Poland Voivodeship.

He was an honorary doctorate of National University of Kyiv-Mohyla Academy since 2006.
