= Zakliczyn =

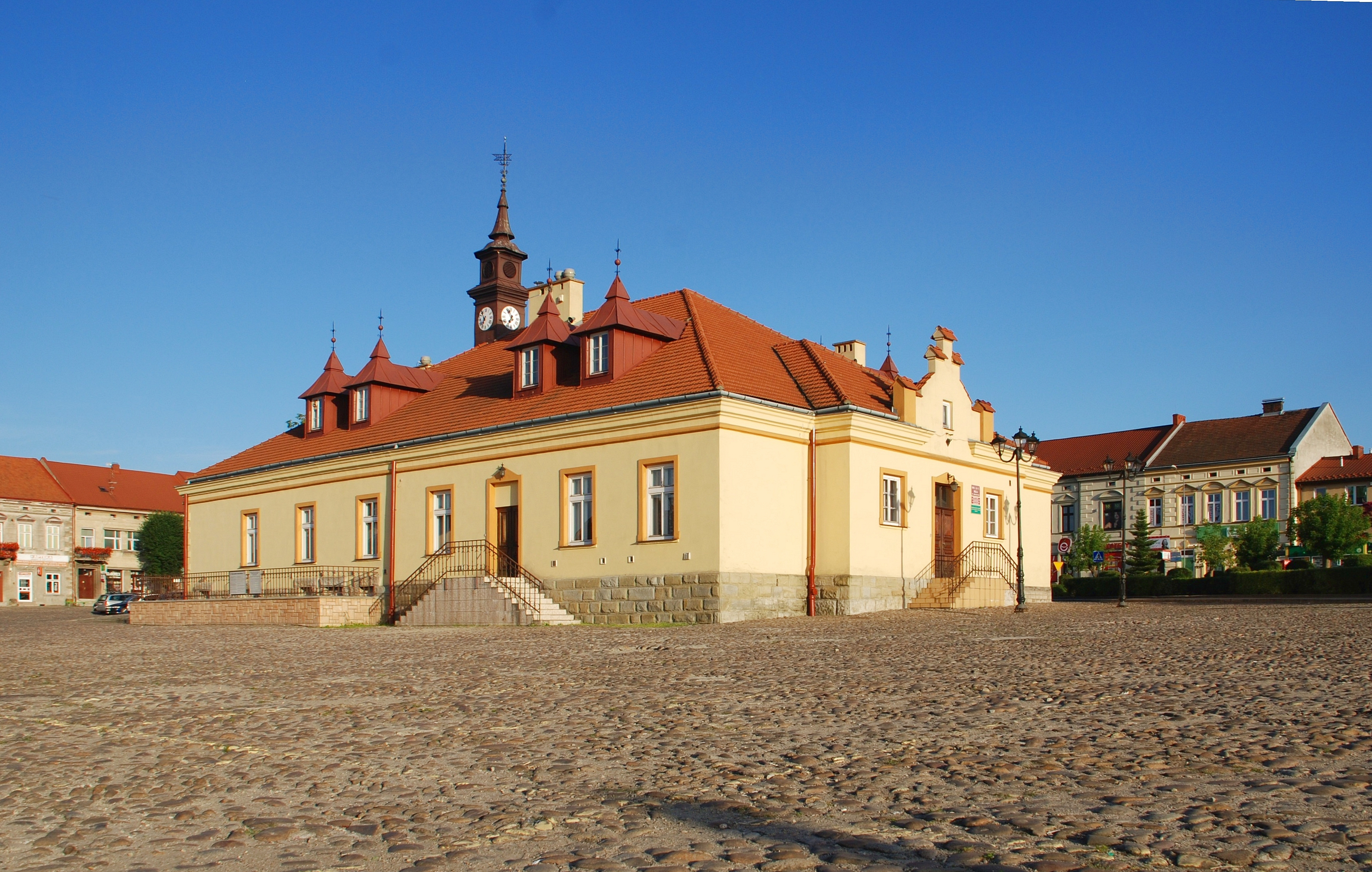
- Town hall

- Flag Coat of arms

- Location within Poland
- Coordinates: 49°51′N 20°49′E
- Country: Poland
- Voivodeship: Lesser Poland
- County: Tarnów
- Gmina: Zakliczyn

Government
  - Mayor: Dawid Chrobak (PiS)

Area
  - Total: 4.02 km^{2} (1.55 sq mi)

Population (2010)
  - Total: 1,541
  - Density: 383/km^{2} (993/sq mi)
- Time zone: UTC+1 (CET)
  - Summer (DST): UTC+2 (CEST)
- Postal code: 32-840
- Vehicle registration: KTA
- Website: http://www.zakliczyn.pl

Zakliczyn [zaˈklʲit͡ʂɨn] is a town in Tarnów County, Lesser Poland Voivodeship, Poland, with a population of 1,541 (2010). Zakliczyn lies on the right bank of the Dunajec river, surrounded by wooded hills 300 to 500 metres (984 to 1,640 feet) above sea level. Zakliczyn has a town hall, located in a spacious market square, one of the largest in the province, at 100 by 170 metres (328 by 558 feet). The town was originally called Opatkowice. Its name was changed in 1558, in honour of the village of Zakliczyn, Myślenice County, which was ancient seat of the Jordan family.

== History ==
Historical population
Year	Pop.	±%
1869	1,210	—
1880	1,230	+1.7%
1890	1,276	+3.7%
1900	1,252	−1.9%
1910	1,228	−1.9%
1921	1,167	−5.0%
2010	1,541	+32.0%

The history of Zakliczyn dates back to 1105, when a settlement called Dunaiz was mentioned in a document by the papal legate Gilles de Paris, according to which, the settlement was said to have belonged to the Benedictine abbey of Tyniec since 1086. In 1215, the village of Opatkowice was mentioned in a document issued by the Bishop of Kraków, Wincenty Kadłubek. At that time, Opatkowice was administratively under the jurisdiction of a starosta in Czchów. By 1326 the village already had a parish church. In the 14th century, Opatkowice developed thanks to its location on the Dunajec river along the merchant route from Tarnów via Stary Sącz to the Kingdom of Hungary. Weekly fairs at Opatkowice attracted merchants from other towns in the area, such as Bobowa, Ciężkowice, Tuchów, and Wojnicz. In ca. 1340, the church at Opatkowice had 465 parishioners. The village still belonged to Tyniec abbey.

Early in 1557, local nobleman, Spytek Wawrzyniec Jordan Trąby coat of arms, owner of Melsztyn castle purchased Opatkowice from the monks of Tyniec abbey. On July 17, 1557 in Vilnius, King Sigismund II Augustus granted Jordan the right to establish a town in Opatkowice with Magdeburg rights at the foot of Melsztyn Castle. In 1558, the village name was changed to "Zakliczyn". By 1581, Zakliczyn was the 10th biggest town in the Kraków Voivodeship, and its cobblers were famous all over Lesser Poland. Zakliczyn prospered in the late 16th and early 17th century (see Polish Golden Age). Together with Melsztyn, the town later belonged to the Zborowski, Sobek and Tarło families in succession. In 1639, the wooden parish church burned down, and Zygmunt Tarło funded a new stone church (1641–50). In early 1615, Zakliczyn again was damaged by fire. In 1652-53 many local residents died in The Plague. On January 5, 1656, during the Swedish invasion of Poland, Zakliczyn was ransacked and burnt down by the Swedes. Despite several royal privileges, tax exemptions and additional fairs, the town never recovered from the destruction. By 1712, it only had 27 artisans. In 1683, King Jan III Sobieski rested here on his way back to Warsaw after the Battle of Vienna.

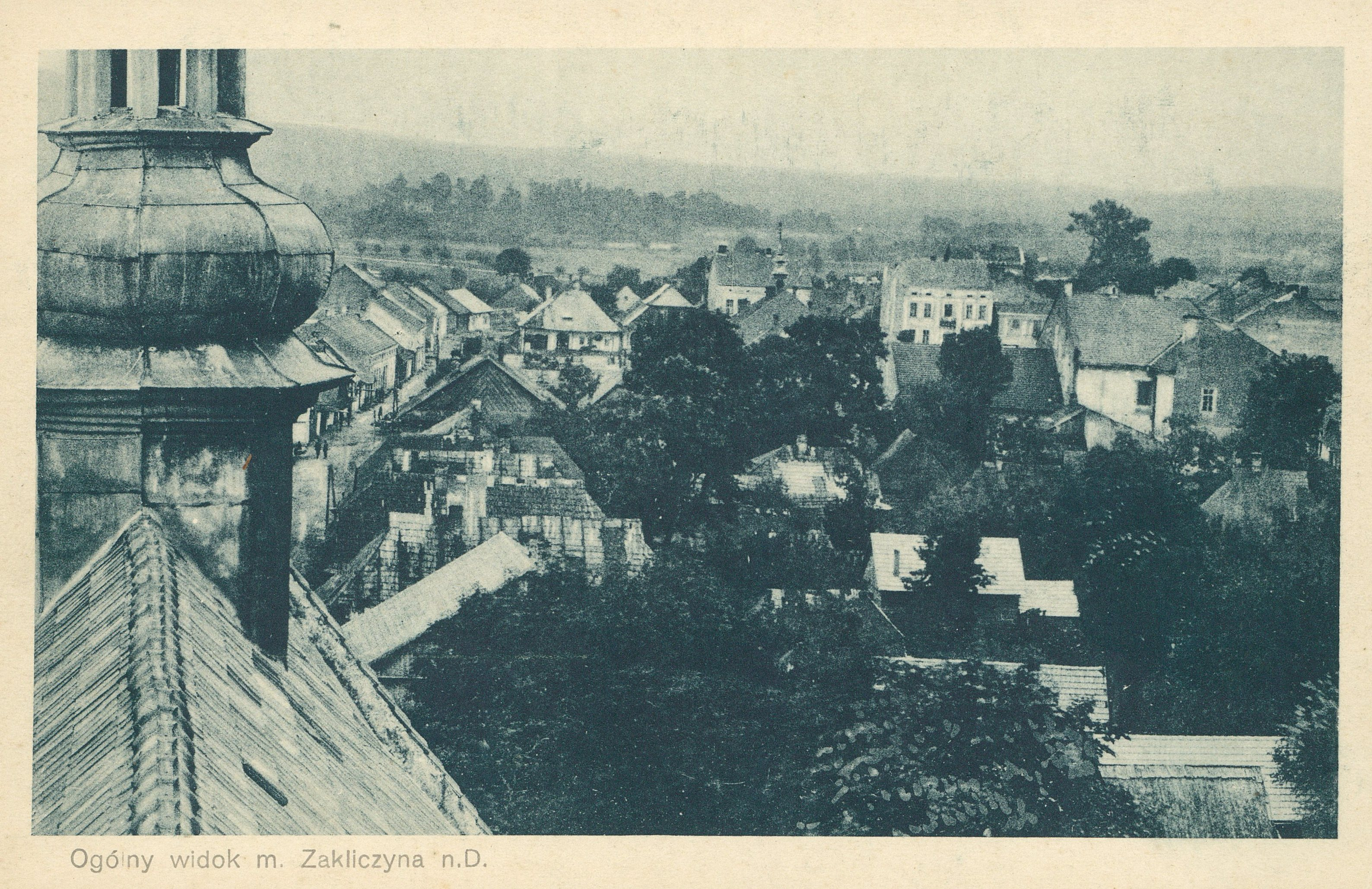
Zakliczyn in the interbellum

From 1744 to 1886 Zakliczyn belonged to the Lanckoroński family. In 1772 (see Partitions of Poland), the town was annexed by the Austrian Empire. Until 1918 it lay within Galicia. In the early 19th century, a new town hall was erected. In early 1846, it was the scene of a peasant revolt when local farmworkers attacked members of Polish nobility (see Galician slaughter), murdering many of them. In 1867, the population of Zakliczyn numbered 1,415.

During World War I, the town was destroyed after heavy Austrian - Russian fighting, several military cemeteries from that era still exist in surrounding villages. In the Second Polish Republic the situation did not improve, and to make matters worse, Zakliczyn suffered widespread destruction in the 1934 flood in Poland. Finally, in 1934 it was stripped of its town charter and was reduced to village status.

=== Stetl and WWII ghetto ===
In 1939 the population of Zakliczyn reached 2,000 of whom 50% were Jews. This led during World War II to the establishment of a Jewish ghetto when the Nazis overran Poland and Jewish citizens were brought in from neighbouring municipalities to Zakliczyn before being transported to Belzec extermination camp. Almost all of Zakliczyn's Jews were murdered in the Holocaust. The German occupiers also burned down several neighbouring villages, killing around 500 of Zakliczyn's Polish catholic residents. Wehrmacht units finally retreated on January 17, 1945 with the arrival of Soviet troops.

== Places of interest ==
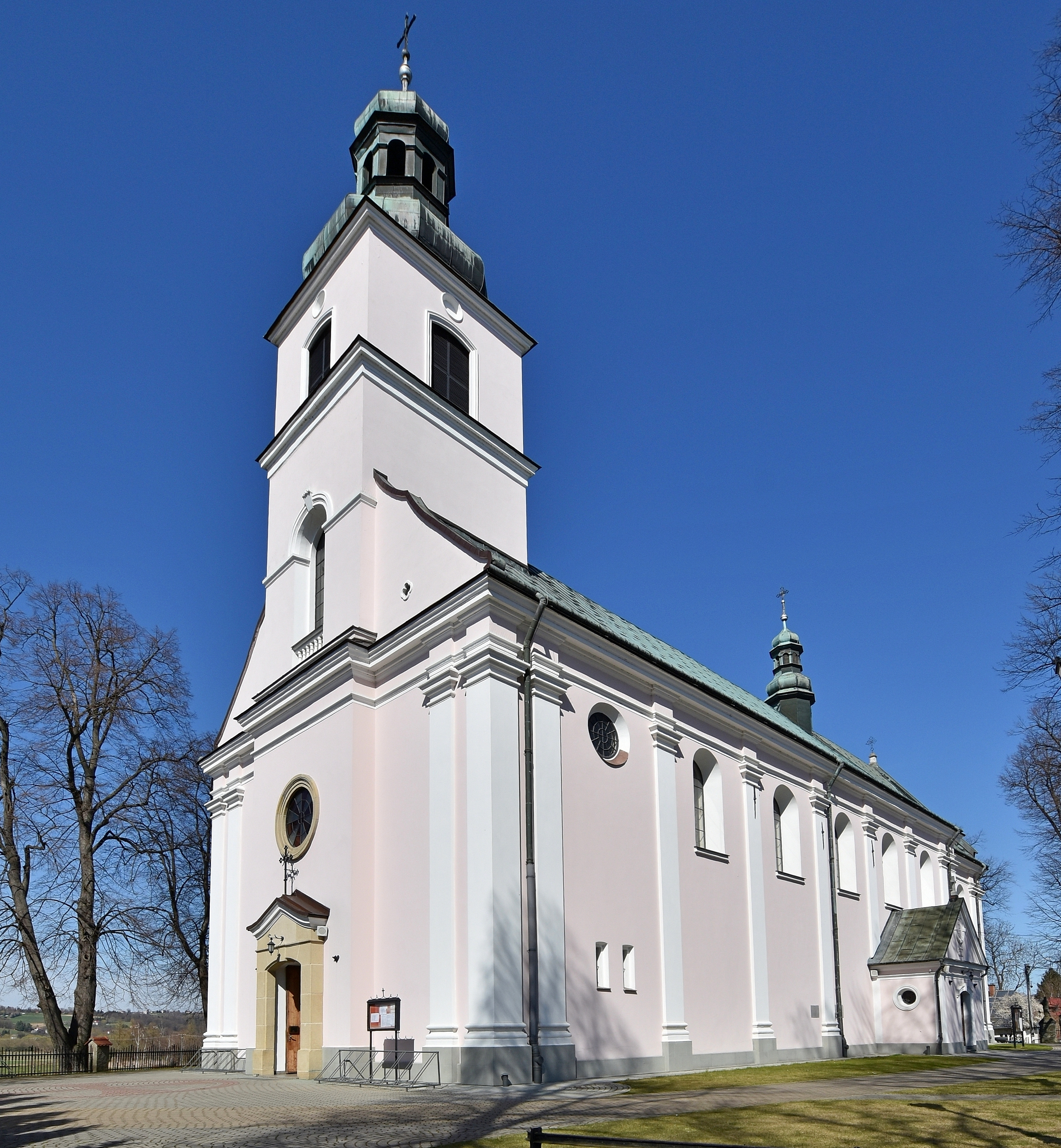
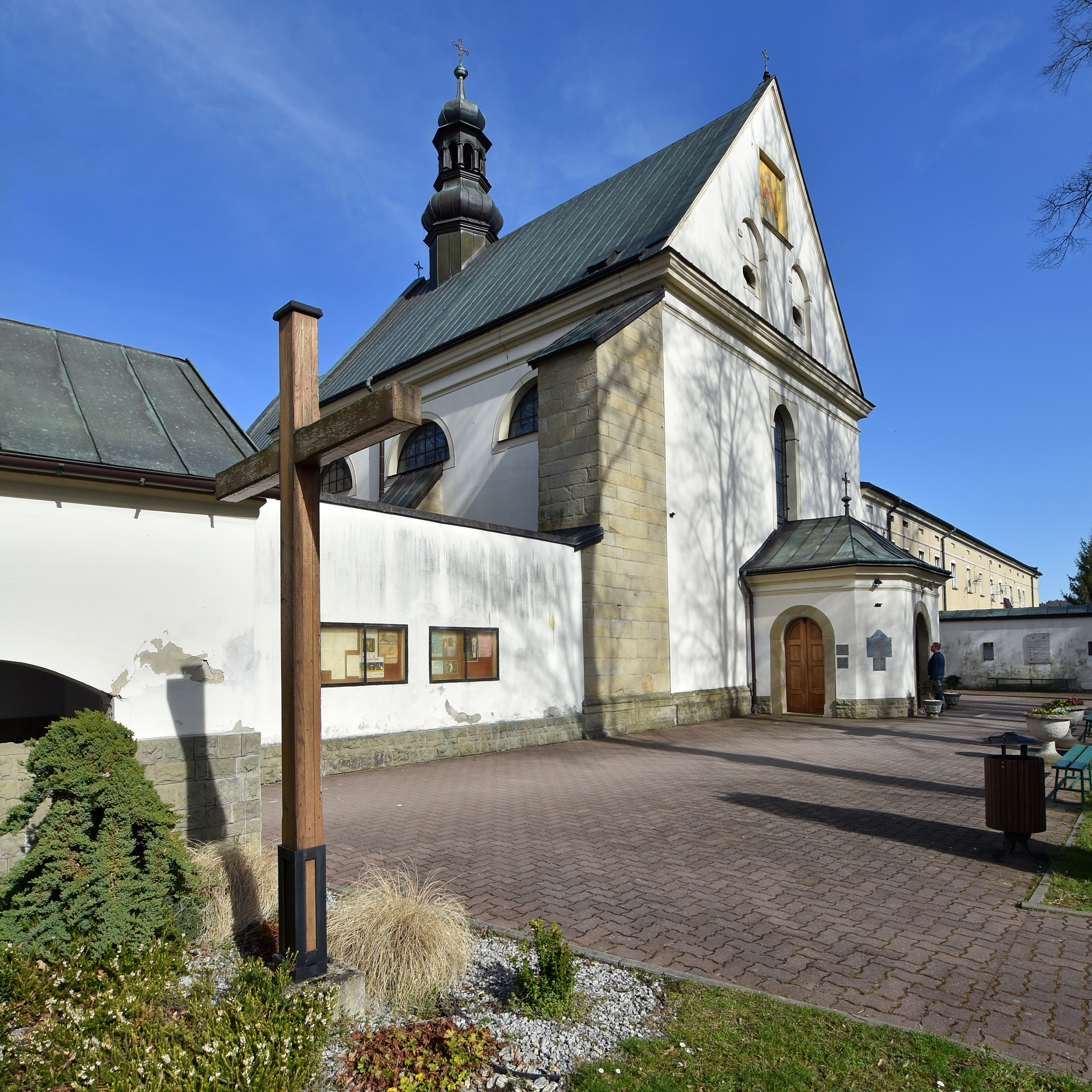
Baroque churches of Saint Giles and of Our Lady of the Angels
- 16th-century urban lay-out of the town centre
- Parish church with a cemetery (1739–68)
- 17th-century Franciscan abbey
- St. Mary's church (1651)
- World War I cemetery (1915–16)
- Town hall, reconstructed in the early 19th-century
- Wooden houses from 18th and 19th-centuries

=== Trivia ===
In 2008, Zakliczyn was one of 19 villages in Europe (Germany, Poland, Italy and Spain) featured in the Spanish documentary film Pueblos de Europa ("Villages of Europe"), produced by Juan Frutos.

== Transport ==
Closest airport: Kraków, closest railway station: Gromnik. Regular bus services take residents to Kraków (90mins by coach) Bochnia, Brzesko, Tarnów (40mins) & Nowy Sącz (30mins) as well as many small villages in between.

== Sport ==
Zakliczyn is home to a sport club Dunajec, founded in 1973.
