= Angela Salawa =

Polish charity worker and Franciscan tertiary, beatified by the Catholic Church

Blessed Angela Salawa, T.O.S.F.
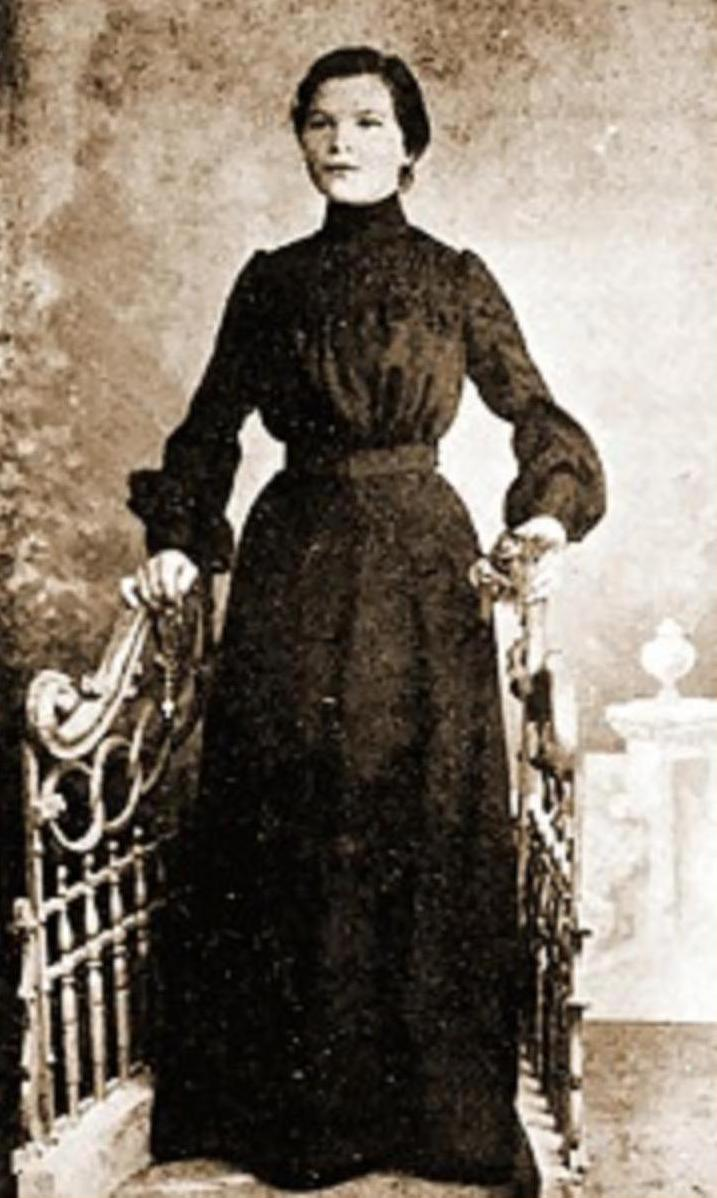
- c. 1914

Holy woman
- Born: 9 September 1881; Siepraw, Kingdom of Galicia and Lodomeria, Austria-Hungary
- Died: 12 March 1922 (aged 40); Kraków, Małopolskie, Poland
- Venerated in: Catholic Church (Poland)
- Beatified: 13 August 1991, Saint Peter's Square, Vatican City by Pope John Paul II
- Major shrine: Basilica of St. Francis of Assisi, Kraków, Poland
- Feast: 12 March
- Patronage: Franciscan tertiaries; Students; People with terminal illnesses; People with multiple sclerosis

Angela Salawa, T.O.S.F. (Polish: Aniela Salawa) (9 September 1881 – 12 March 1922) was a Polish woman who served in hospitals in World War I. She was the 11th child and lived in a very religious family. She became a member of the Third Order of Saint Francis and volunteered in hospitals throughout World War I. She later became ill due to her care for the sick and died in 1922. Pope John Paul II beatified her in 1991.

== Biography ==
Angela Salawa came from the village of Siepraw near Kraków, Poland. She was born in 1881 to Bartłomiej Salawa and Ewa Bochenek. There were twelve children in her family, with Salawa being the eleventh. Her father Bartłomiej was a blacksmith. Salawa was baptized four days after her birth. The family was poor, and because she was weak and sickly, Salawa was not as able help with chores as much as her more physically robust siblings. She was an obedient child who tried to do her best to help her family. From an early age she felt Christ's call on her heart.

At the age of 16, Salawa left home to work as a maid in Kraków. While there, she became caught up in worldly pursuits and her religious fervor waned. She was much affected by the death of her sister Teresa, who had appealed to Salawa to reconsider her worldly values. While dancing at a wedding reception, Salawa perceived Christ standing nearby, asking her how she could prefer dancing to following him. The experience was a turning-point in her life. She immediately went to a church to pray and became devoted to adoring Christ in the Blessed Sacrament.

Salawa considered a religious vocation, but her weak physical health was an impediment. She decided to remain in the world, taking private vows of purity and virtue in 1900. She continued to work as a maid, but suffered due to a breach between herself and her family and from false accusations by her employer.

In 1912, Salawa became a member of the Secular Franciscan Order. She felt an affinity with Francis of Assisi, who, like Salawa herself, had broken with his family.

When World War I broke out in 1914, Salawa remained in Kraków, nursing soldiers. Her own health was deteriorating, but no one noticed her suffering. In 1916 her employer accused her of stealing, and she lost her employment. She was homeless, in pain and ill, but she was discharged from the hospital because she appeared to be well. Eventually she was alone in the world, living in a basement room, abandoned by family, friends and neighbors. She died on 12 March 1922.

== Beatification ==
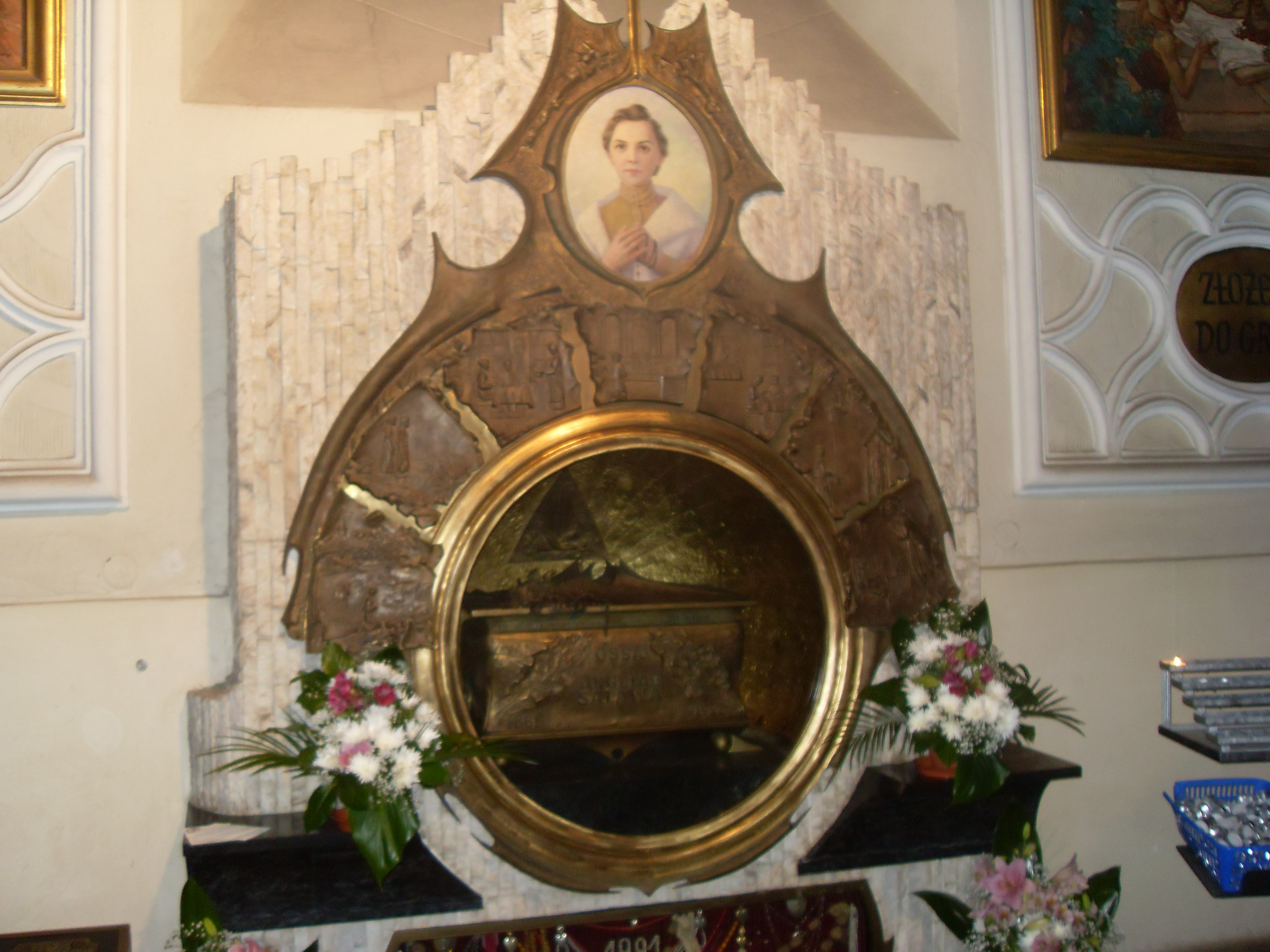
The tomb of Angela Salawa

The cause for Salawa's beatification was opened on 7 July 1949. As part of this process, her remains were enshrined in the Basilica of St. Francis of Assisi in Kraków. Pope John Paul II declared Salawa's heroic virtue on 23 October 1987.

In 1990 in Polish Nowy Targ there was a young boy who suffered a severe brain injury. The intercession of Angela Salawa was asked to help the boy, and he made a full recovery. This was investigated and was later validated on 12 April 1991. John Paul II approved the miracle on 6 July 1991 and beatified Salawa on 13 August 1991.
