= Łyczanka, Myślenice County =

Łyczanka
- Village
- Location within Poland
- Coordinates: 49°56′N 20°0′E
- Country: Poland
- Voivodeship: Lesser Poland
- County: Myślenice
- Gmina: Siepraw
- Population (approx.): 500

Łyczanka [wɨˈt͡ʂaŋka] is a village in the administrative district of Gmina Siepraw, within Myślenice County, Lesser Poland Voivodeship, in southern Poland.

The village has an approximate population of 500.
