= Zakliczyn, Myślenice County =

Zakliczyn
- Village
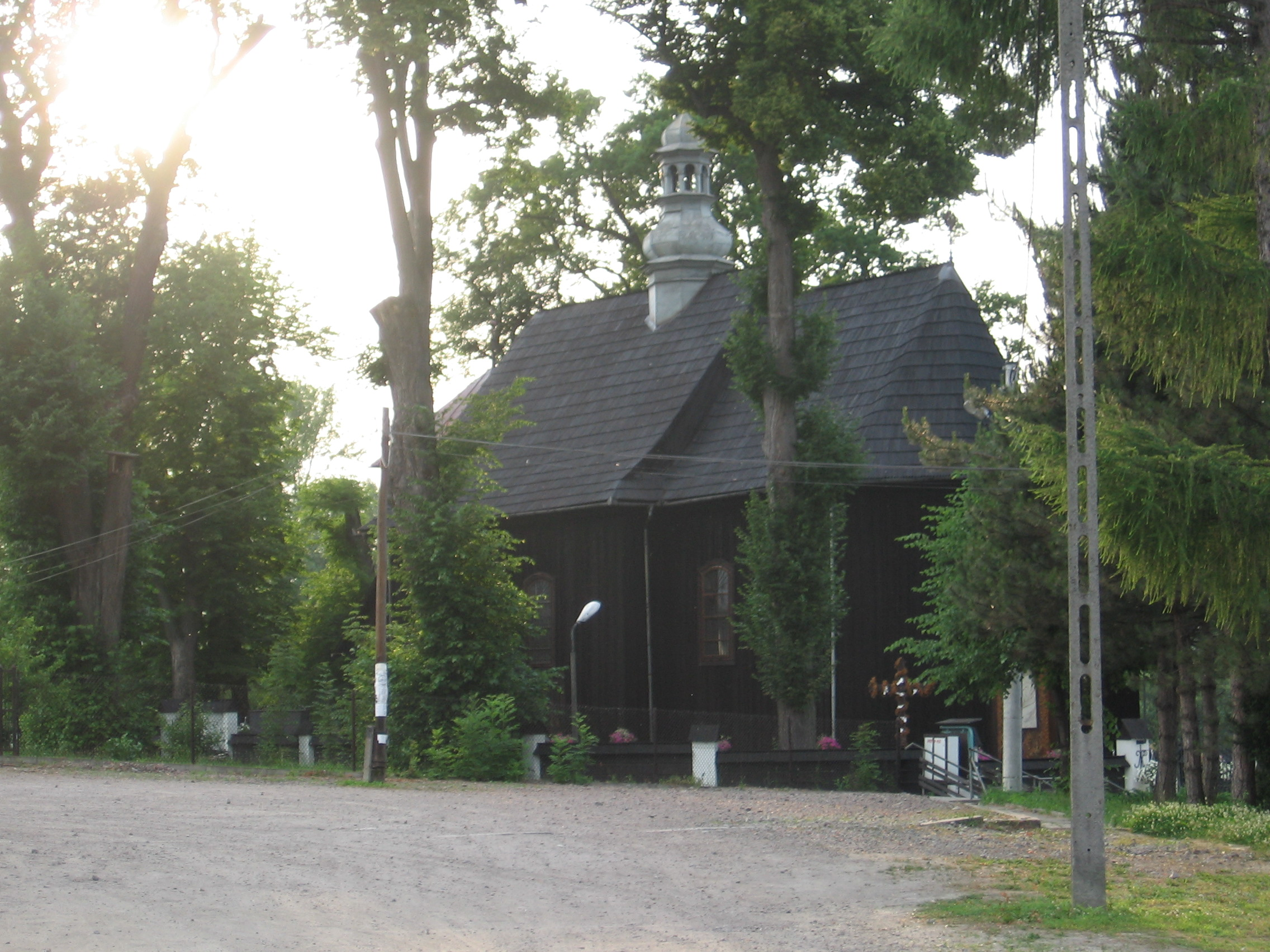
- Church of All Saints

- Location within Poland
- Coordinates: 49°53′N 20°2′E
- Country: Poland
- Voivodeship: Lesser Poland
- County: Myślenice
- Gmina: Siepraw

Population
  - Total: 1,600

Zakliczyn [zaˈklit͡ʂɨn] is a village in the administrative district of Gmina Siepraw, within Myślenice County, Lesser Poland Voivodeship, in southern Poland.
