= Lovčice (Hodonín District) =

- Municipality
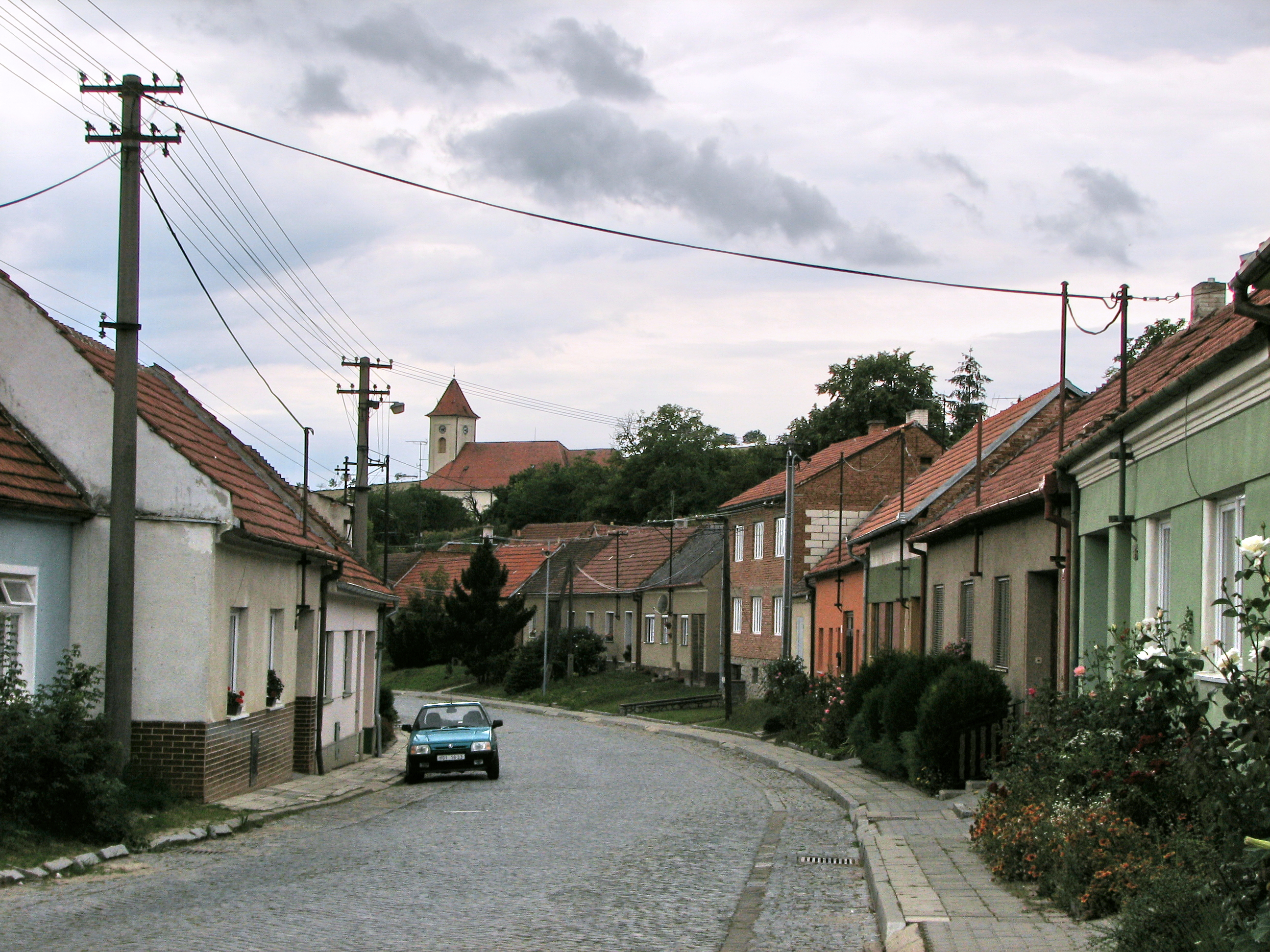
- Main street

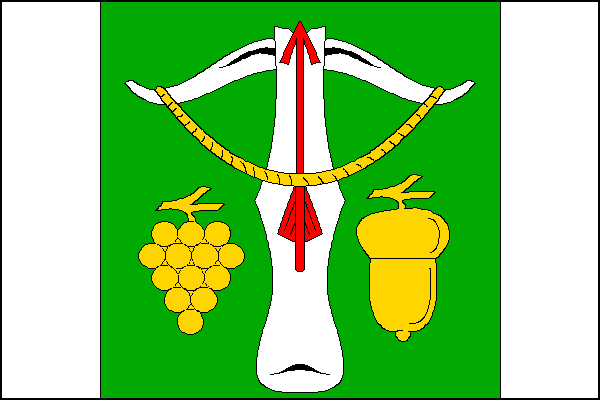
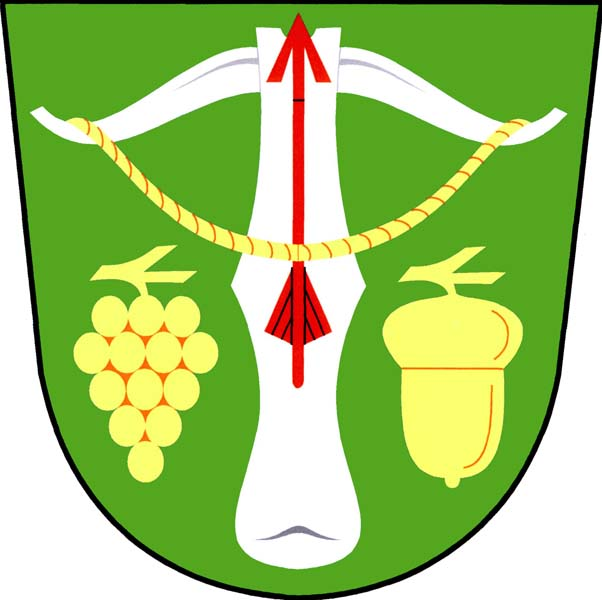
- Flag Coat of arms

- Location in the Czech Republic
- Coordinates: 49°3′49″N 17°3′15″E
- Country: Czech Republic
- Region: South Moravian
- District: Hodonín
- First mentioned: 1131

Area
  - Total: 16.50 km^{2} (6.37 sq mi)
- Elevation: 228 m (748 ft)

Population (2026-01-01)
  - Total: 835
  - Density: 50.6/km^{2} (131/sq mi)
- Time zone: UTC+1 (CET)
  - Summer (DST): UTC+2 (CEST)
- Postal code: 696 39
- Website: www.lovcice.cz

Lovčice (until 1921 Velké Lovčice; German: Gross Lowtschitz) is a municipality and village in Hodonín District in the South Moravian Region of the Czech Republic. It has about 800 inhabitants.

Lovčice lies approximately 26 kilometres (16 mi) north of Hodonín, 36 km (22 mi) south-east of Brno, and 222 km (138 mi) south-east of Prague.

== Demographics ==
Historical population
| Year | Pop. | ±% |
|---|---|---|
| 1869 | 1,142 | — |
| 1880 | 1,184 | +3.7% |
| 1890 | 1,287 | +8.7% |
| 1900 | 1,316 | +2.3% |
| 1910 | 1,381 | +4.9% |
| 1921 | 1,358 | −1.7% |
| 1930 | 1,282 | −5.6% |
| 1950 | 1,136 | −11.4% |
| 1961 | 1,184 | +4.2% |
| 1970 | 1,033 | −12.8% |
| 1980 | 962 | −6.9% |
| 1991 | 820 | −14.8% |
| 2001 | 797 | −2.8% |
| 2011 | 785 | −1.5% |
| 2021 | 811 | +3.3% |
Source: Censuses
