= Sudslava =

- Municipality
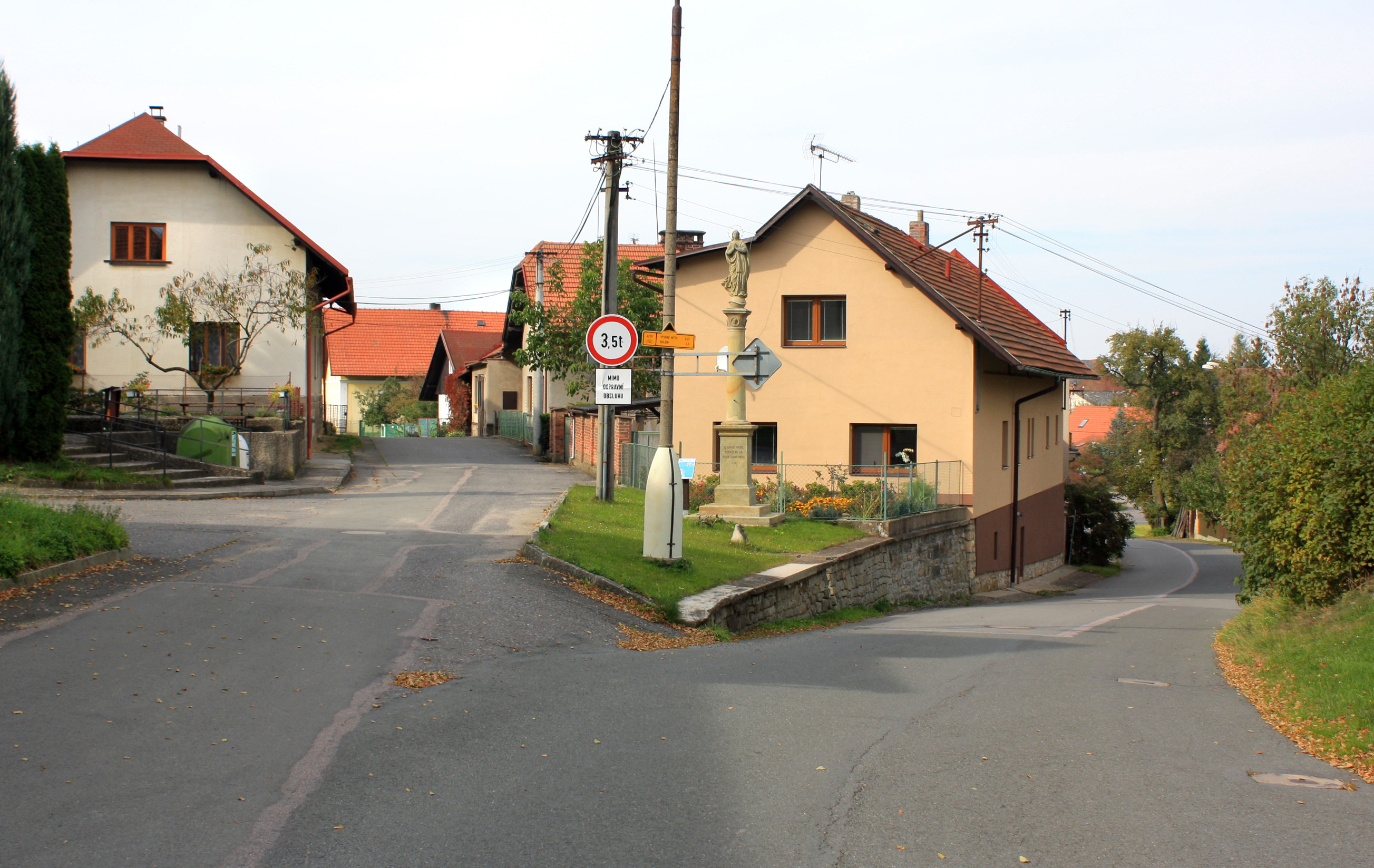
- Crossroads with a Marian column

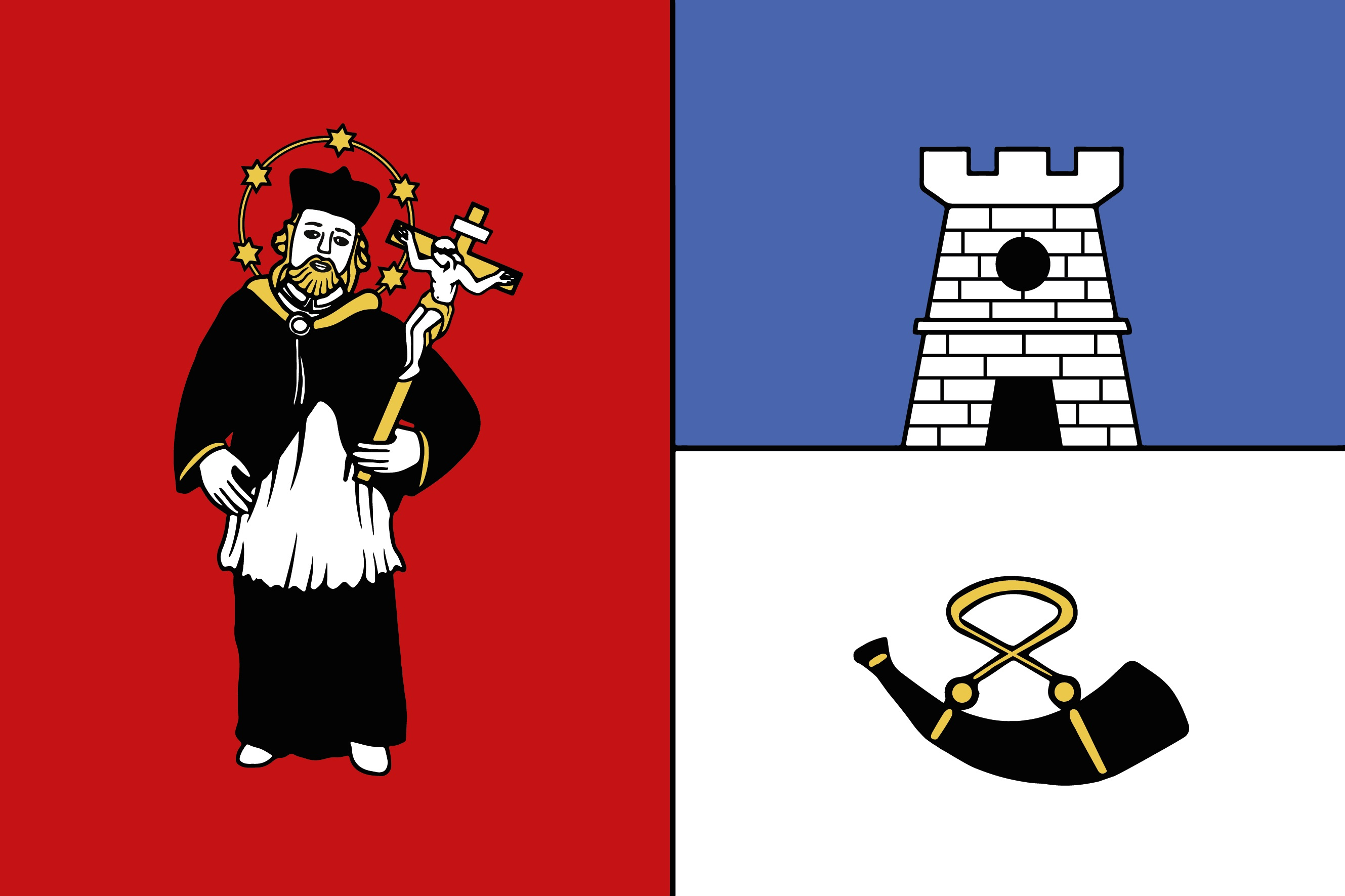
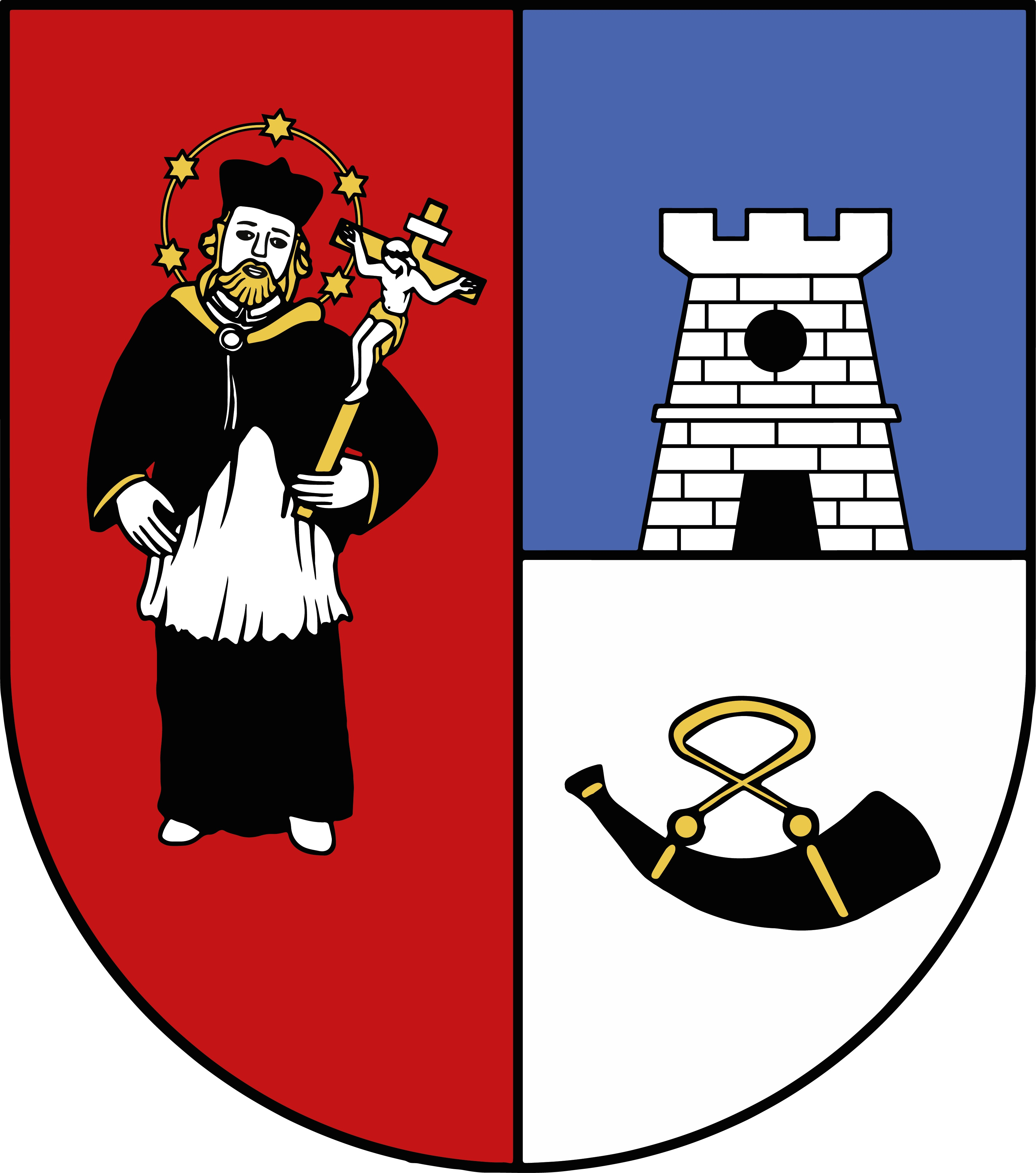
- Flag Coat of arms

- Location in the Czech Republic
- Coordinates: 50°2′26″N 16°17′11″E
- Country: Czech Republic
- Region: Pardubice
- District: Ústí nad Orlicí
- First mentioned: 1349

Area
  - Total: 4.41 km^{2} (1.70 sq mi)
- Elevation: 432 m (1,417 ft)

Population (2026-01-01)
  - Total: 168
  - Density: 38.1/km^{2} (98.7/sq mi)
- Time zone: UTC+1 (CET)
  - Summer (DST): UTC+2 (CEST)
- Postal code: 561 13
- Website: www.sudslava.cz

Sudslava (German: Cuslau) is a municipality and village in Ústí nad Orlicí District in the Pardubice Region of the Czech Republic. It has about 200 inhabitants.

Sudslava lies approximately 11 kilometres (7 mi) north-west of Ústí nad Orlicí, 37 km (23 mi) east of Pardubice, and 134 km (83 mi) east of Prague.

== Demographics ==
Historical population
Year	Pop.	±%
1869	359	—
1880	326	−9.2%
1890	329	+0.9%
1900	307	−6.7%
1910	327	+6.5%
1921	314	−4.0%
1930	285	−9.2%
1950	243	−14.7%
1961	225	−7.4%
1970	197	−12.4%
1980	191	−3.0%
1991	152	−20.4%
2001	178	+17.1%
2011	180	+1.1%
2021	169	−6.1%
Source: Censuses
