= Skořenice =

- Municipality
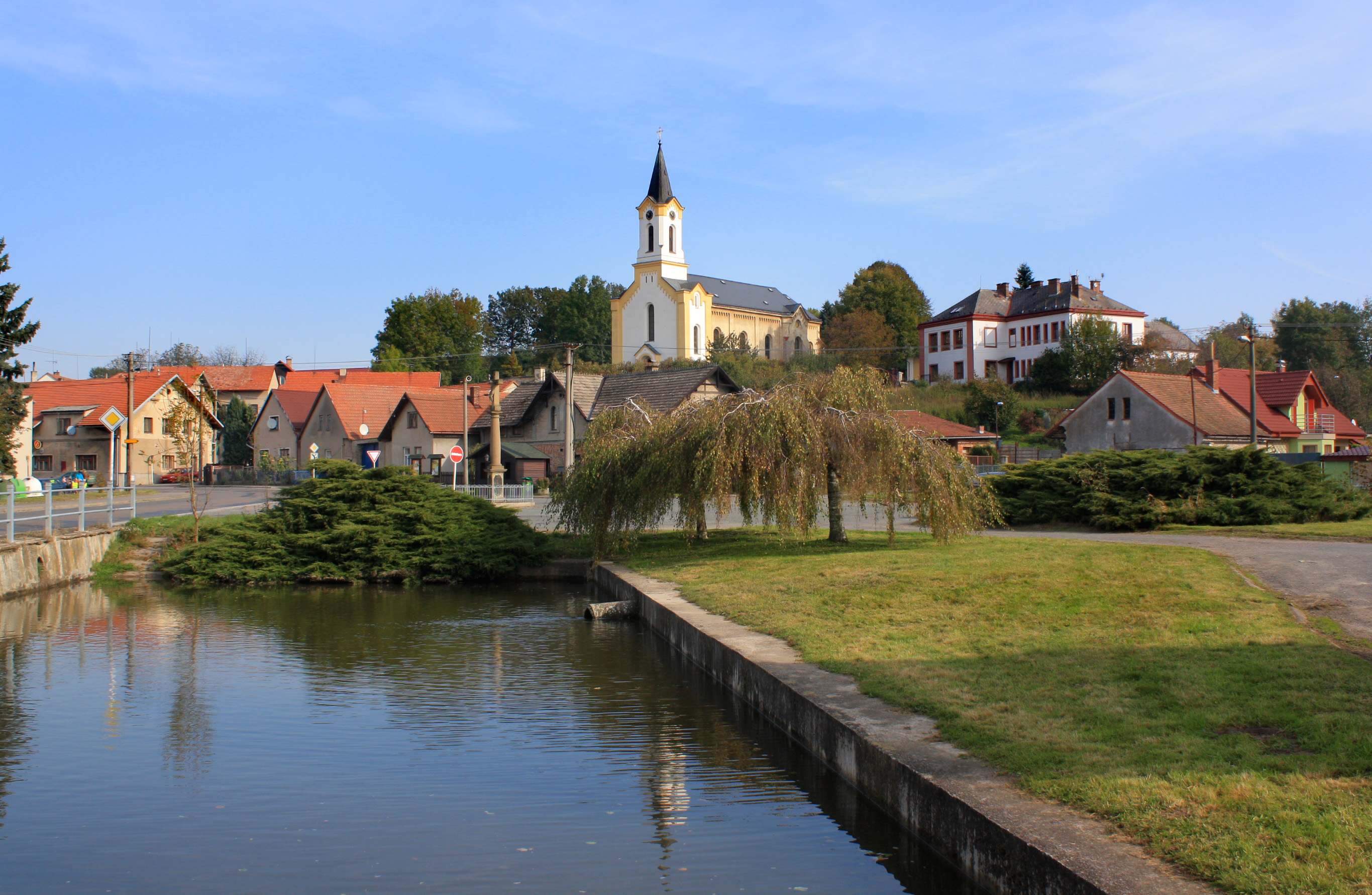
- Centre of Skořenice

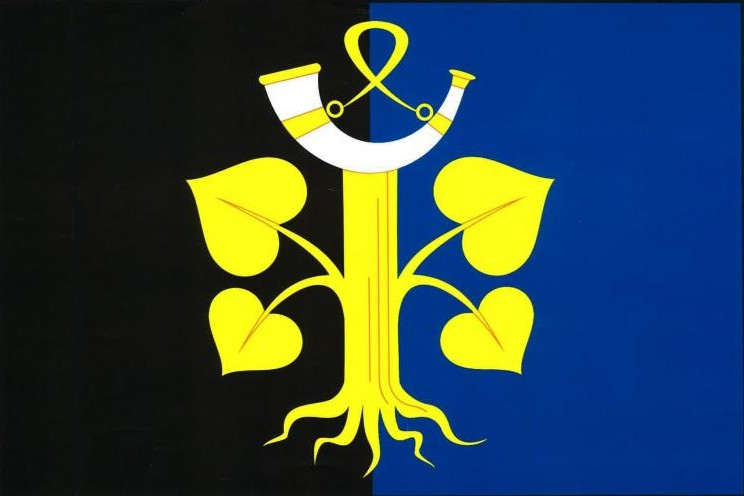
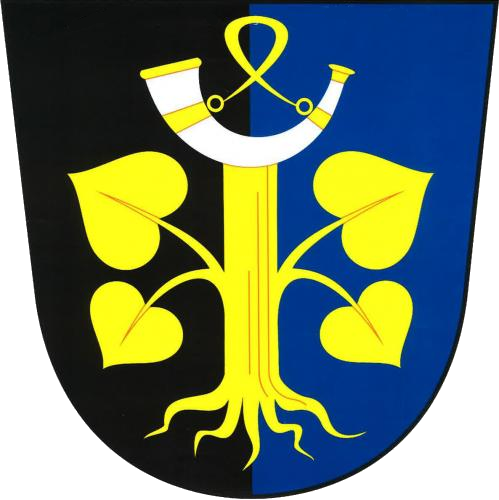
- Flag Coat of arms

- Location in the Czech Republic
- Coordinates: 50°1′53″N 16°13′19″E
- Country: Czech Republic
- Region: Pardubice
- District: Ústí nad Orlicí
- First mentioned: 1373

Area
  - Total: 4.46 km^{2} (1.72 sq mi)
- Elevation: 294 m (965 ft)

Population (2026-01-01)
  - Total: 405
  - Density: 90.8/km^{2} (235/sq mi)
- Time zone: UTC+1 (CET)
  - Summer (DST): UTC+2 (CEST)
- Postal code: 565 01
- Website: www.skorenice.cz

Skořenice (German: Skorenitz) is a municipality and village in Ústí nad Orlicí District in the Pardubice Region of the Czech Republic. It has about 400 inhabitants.

Skořenice lies approximately 15 kilometres (9 mi) north-west of Ústí nad Orlicí, 32 km (20 mi) east of Pardubice, and 129 km (80 mi) east of Prague.

== Demographics ==
Historical population
Year	Pop.	±%
1869	489	—
1880	521	+6.5%
1890	508	−2.5%
1900	503	−1.0%
1910	444	−11.7%
1921	547	+23.2%
1930	501	−8.4%
1950	433	−13.6%
1961	500	+15.5%
1970	428	−14.4%
1980	394	−7.9%
1991	372	−5.6%
2001	451	+21.2%
2011	431	−4.4%
2021	373	−13.5%
Source: Censuses
