= Czechówka, Lesser Poland Voivodeship =

Czechówka
- Village
- Location within Poland
- Coordinates: 49°54′N 20°1′E
- Country: Poland
- Voivodeship: Lesser Poland
- County: Myślenice
- Gmina: Siepraw

Czechówka [t͡ʂɛˈxufka] is a village in the administrative district of Gmina Siepraw, within Myślenice County, Lesser Poland Voivodeship, in southern Poland.
