= Pankiewicz =

Pankiewicz is surname of:

- Józef Pankiewicz (1866–1940), a Polish painter, graphic artist, and pedagogue
- Tadeusz Pankiewicz (1908 in Samborz – 1993), a Polish Righteous among the Nations
