= Siepraw =

- Village
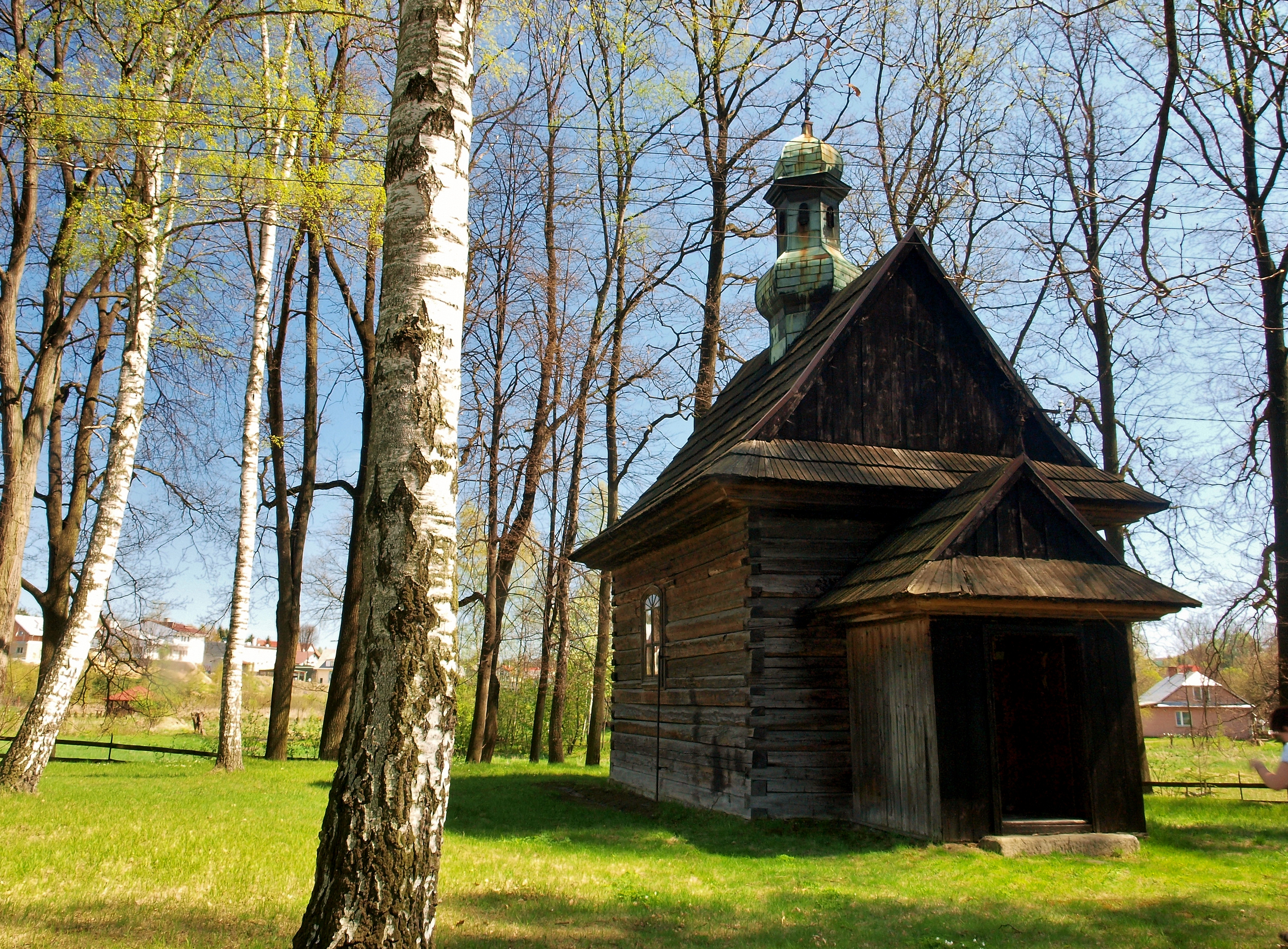
- Saint Martin Church

- Location within Poland
- Coordinates: 49°55′N 19°59′E
- Country: Poland
- Voivodeship: Lesser Poland
- County: Myślenice
- Gmina: Siepraw
- Population (approx.): 5,000

Siepraw [ˈɕɛpraf] is a village in Myślenice County, Lesser Poland Voivodeship, in southern Poland. It is the seat of the gmina (administrative district) called Gmina Siepraw.

The village has an approximate population of 5,000. It is the location of the Siepraw Ski resort.
