= Gmina Siepraw =

Gmina Siepraw Siepraw Commune
- Gmina
- Coat of arms
- Interactive map of Gmina Siepraw
- Coordinates (Siepraw): 49°55′N 19°59′E
- Country: Poland
- Voivodeship: Lesser Poland
- County: Myślenice
- Seat: Siepraw

Area
  - Total: 31.92 km^{2} (12.32 sq mi)

Population (2006)
  - Total: 7,809
  - Density: 244.6/km^{2} (633.6/sq mi)
- Website: http://www.siepraw.pl

Gmina Siepraw is a rural gmina (administrative district) in Myślenice County, Lesser Poland Voivodeship, in southern Poland. Its seat is the village of Siepraw, which lies approximately 10 kilometres (6 mi) north of Myślenice and 17 km (11 mi) south of the regional capital Kraków.

The gmina covers an area of 31.92 square kilometres (12.3 sq mi), and as of 2006 its total population is 7,809.

== Villages ==
Gmina Siepraw contains the villages and settlements of Czechówka, Łyczanka, Siepraw and Zakliczyn.

== Neighbouring gminas ==
Gmina Siepraw is bordered by the gminas of Dobczyce, Mogilany, Myślenice, Świątniki Górne and Wieliczka.
