= Lovčice (Hradec Králové District) =

- Municipality
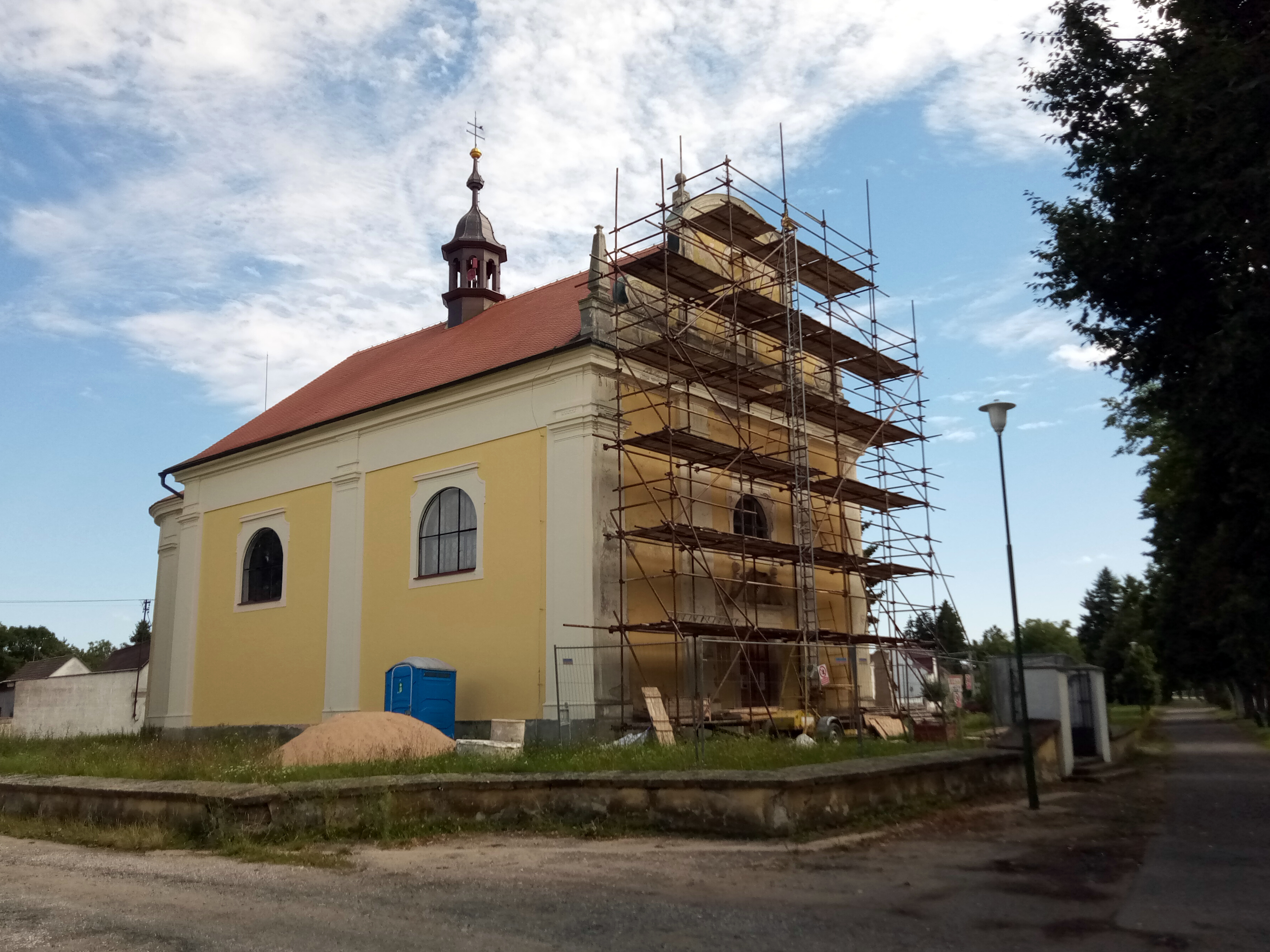
- Church of Saint Bartholomew

- Flag Coat of arms

- Location in the Czech Republic
- Coordinates: 50°9′55″N 15°23′5″E
- Country: Czech Republic
- Region: Hradec Králové
- District: Hradec Králové
- First mentioned: 1354

Area
  - Total: 10.25 km^{2} (3.96 sq mi)
- Elevation: 222 m (728 ft)

Population (2026-01-01)
  - Total: 736
  - Density: 71.8/km^{2} (186/sq mi)
- Time zone: UTC+1 (CET)
  - Summer (DST): UTC+2 (CEST)
- Postal code: 503 61
- Website: www.lovcice.eu

Lovčice (German: Lautschitz) is a municipality and village in Hradec Králové District in the Hradec Králové Region of the Czech Republic. It has about 700 inhabitants.

== Demographics ==
Historical population
Year	Pop.	±%
1869	866	—
1880	1,089	+25.8%
1890	1,100	+1.0%
1900	1,017	−7.5%
1910	1,031	+1.4%
1921	1,023	−0.8%
1930	1,064	+4.0%
1950	885	−16.8%
1961	861	−2.7%
1970	779	−9.5%
1980	751	−3.6%
1991	663	−11.7%
2001	620	−6.5%
2011	661	+6.6%
2021	646	−2.3%
Source: Censuses
