= Brzezowa =

Brzezowa may refer to the following places:

- Brzezowa, Bochnia County in Lesser Poland Voivodeship (south Poland)
- Brzezowa, Myślenice County in Lesser Poland Voivodeship (south Poland)
- Brzezowa, Subcarpathian Voivodeship (south-east Poland)
