= Lubomierz (disambiguation) =

Lubomierz may refer to the following places:

- Lubomierz, Bochnia County in Lesser Poland Voivodeship (south Poland)
- Lubomierz, Limanowa County in Lesser Poland Voivodeship (south Poland)
- Lubomierz in Lower Silesian Voivodeship (south-west Poland)
