= Tarnau =

Tarnau is the German name for at least two places in Poland:

- Tarnów, a city in Lesser Poland Voivodeship
- Tarnów Opolski, a village in Opole Voivodeship

== See also ==
- Tarnawa (disambiguation)
