= Kamyk =

Kamyk may refer to the following places in Poland:

- Kamyk, Lesser Poland Voivodeship (south Poland)
- Kamyk, Łódź Voivodeship (central Poland)
- Kamyk, Silesian Voivodeship (south Poland)

== See also ==
- Kamýk (disambiguation), several places in the Czech Republic
