= Boczów =

Boczów refers to the following places in Poland:

- Boczów, Lesser Poland Voivodeship
- Boczów, Lubusz Voivodeship
