= Kornatka =

Kornatka may refer to the following places:

- Kornatka, Lesser Poland Voivodeship (south Poland)
- Kornatka, Pomeranian Voivodeship (north Poland)
- Kornatka, West Pomeranian Voivodeship (north-west Poland)
