= Kamýk =

Kamýk may refer to places in the Czech Republic:

- Kamýk (Litoměřice District), a municipality and village in the Ústí nad Labem Region
- Kamýk (Prague), a cadastrial area of Prague
- Kamýk nad Vltavou, a municipality and village in the Central Bohemian Region

== See also ==
- Kamyk (disambiguation), several places in Poland
