= Bieńkowice, Myślenice County =

Bieńkowice
- Village
- Location within Poland
- Coordinates: 49°54′N 20°3′E
- Country: Poland
- Voivodeship: Lesser Poland
- County: Myślenice
- Gmina: Dobczyce

Bieńkowice [bjɛɲkɔˈvit͡sɛ] is a village in the administrative district of Gmina Dobczyce, within Myślenice County, Lesser Poland Voivodeship, in southern Poland.
