= Dziekanowice, Myślenice County =

Dziekanowice
- Village
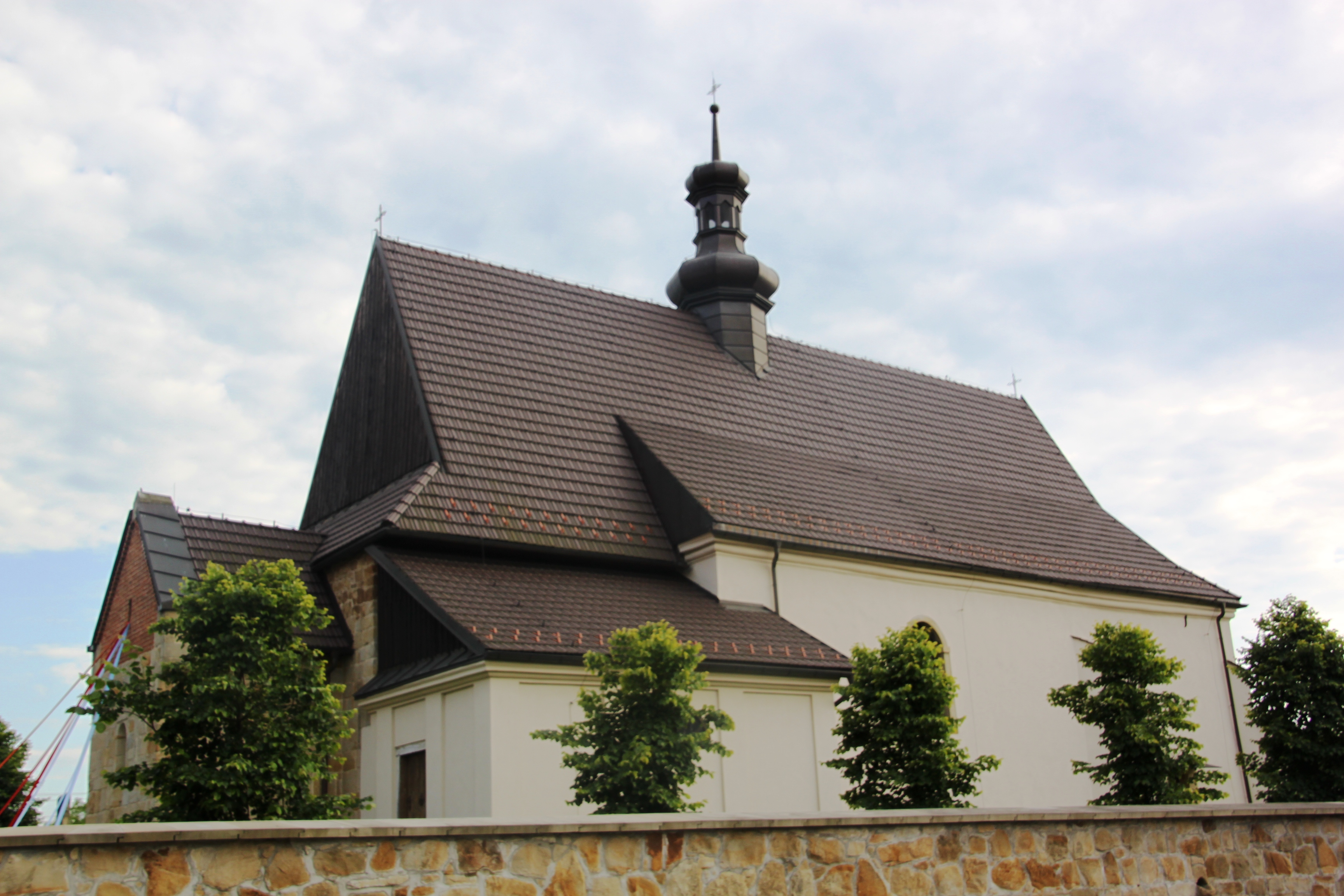
- Saint Nicholas and Mary Magdalene church

- Location within Poland
- Coordinates: 49°54′11″N 20°5′45″E
- Country: Poland
- Voivodeship: Lesser Poland
- County: Myślenice
- Gmina: Dobczyce
- Website: http://www.maryjny.republika.pl/#dziekanowice

Dziekanowice [d͡ʑɛkanɔˈvit͡sɛ] is a village in the administrative district of Gmina Dobczyce, within Myślenice County, Lesser Poland Voivodeship, in southern Poland.
