= Kędzierzynka =

- Village
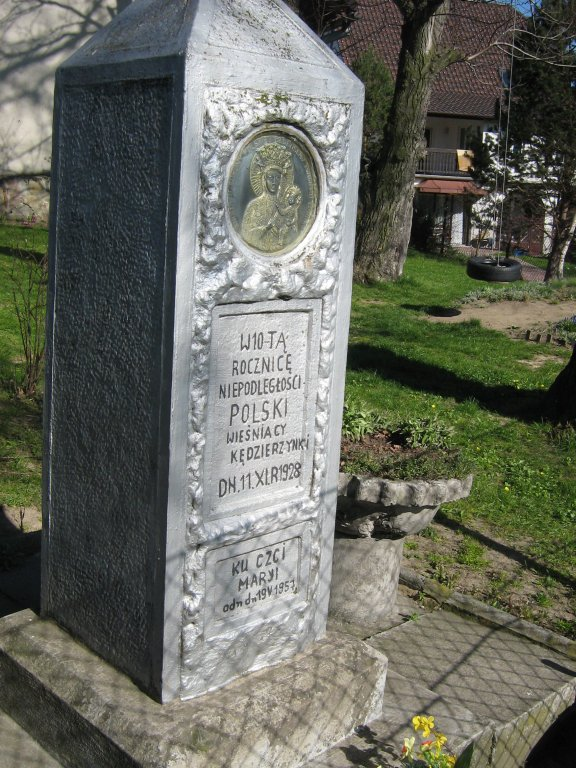
- Monument to the independence of Poland

- Location within Poland
- Coordinates: 49°53′N 20°9′E
- Country: Poland
- Voivodeship: Lesser Poland
- County: Myślenice
- Gmina: Dobczyce
- Population: 400

Kędzierzynka [kɛnd͡ʑɛˈʐɨnka] is a village in the administrative district of Gmina Dobczyce, within Myślenice County, Lesser Poland Voivodeship, in southern Poland.
