= Wolica, Bochnia County =

Wolica
- Village
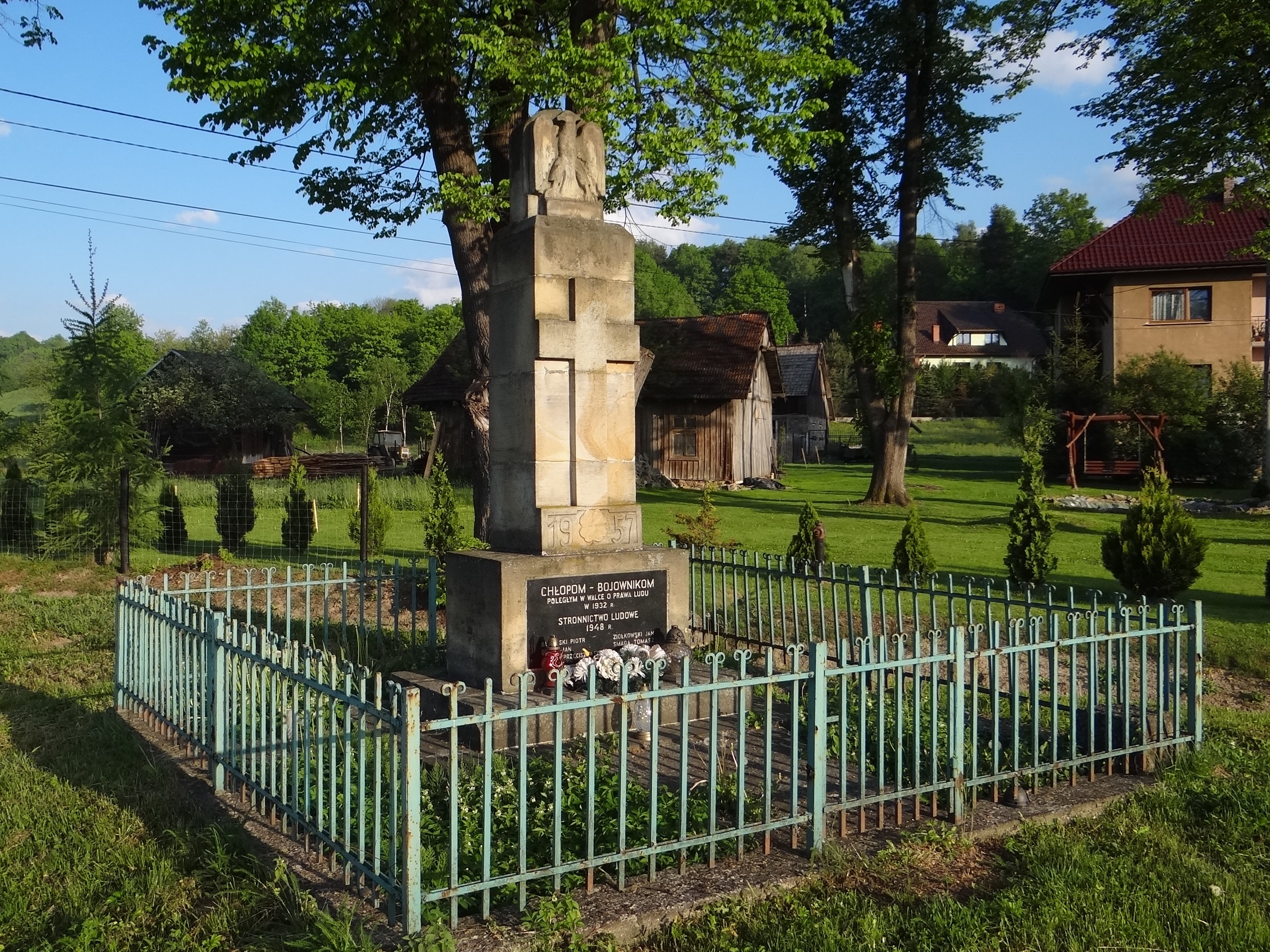
- Monument dedicated to peasant-fighters

- Location within Poland
- Coordinates: 49°51′40″N 20°15′59″E
- Country: Poland
- Voivodeship: Lesser Poland
- County: Bochnia
- Gmina: Łapanów
- Website: http://www.lapanow.pl

Wolica [vɔˈlit͡sa] is a village in the administrative district of Gmina Łapanów, within Bochnia County, Lesser Poland Voivodeship, in southern Poland. It had a population of 230 in 2005.
