= Gmina Łapanów =

Gmina Łapanów Łapanów Commune
- Gmina
- Flag Coat of arms
- Interactive map of Gmina Łapanów
- Coordinates (Łapanów): 49°52′N 20°18′E
- Country: Poland
- Voivodeship: Lesser Poland
- County: Bochnia
- Seat: Łapanów

Area
  - Total: 71.18 km^{2} (27.48 sq mi)

Population (2006)
  - Total: 7,533
  - Density: 105.8/km^{2} (274.1/sq mi)
- Website: http://www.lapanow.pl/

Gmina Łapanów is a rural gmina (administrative district) in Bochnia County, Lesser Poland Voivodeship, in southern Poland. Its seat is the village of Łapanów, which lies approximately 17 kilometres (11 mi) south-west of Bochnia and 34 km (21 mi) south-east of the regional capital Kraków.

The gmina covers an area of 71.18 square kilometres (27.5 sq mi), and as of 2006 its total population is 7,533.

== Villages ==
Gmina Łapanów contains the villages and settlements of Boczów, Brzezowa, Chrostowa, Cichawka, Grabie, Kamyk, Kępanów, Kobylec, Łapanów, Lubomierz, Sobolów, Tarnawa, Ubrzeż, Wieruszyce, Wola Wieruszycka, Wolica and Zbydniów.

== Neighbouring gminas ==
Gmina Łapanów is bordered by the gminas of Bochnia, Gdów, Jodłownik, Limanowa, Raciechowice and Trzciana.
