= Kępanów =

- Village
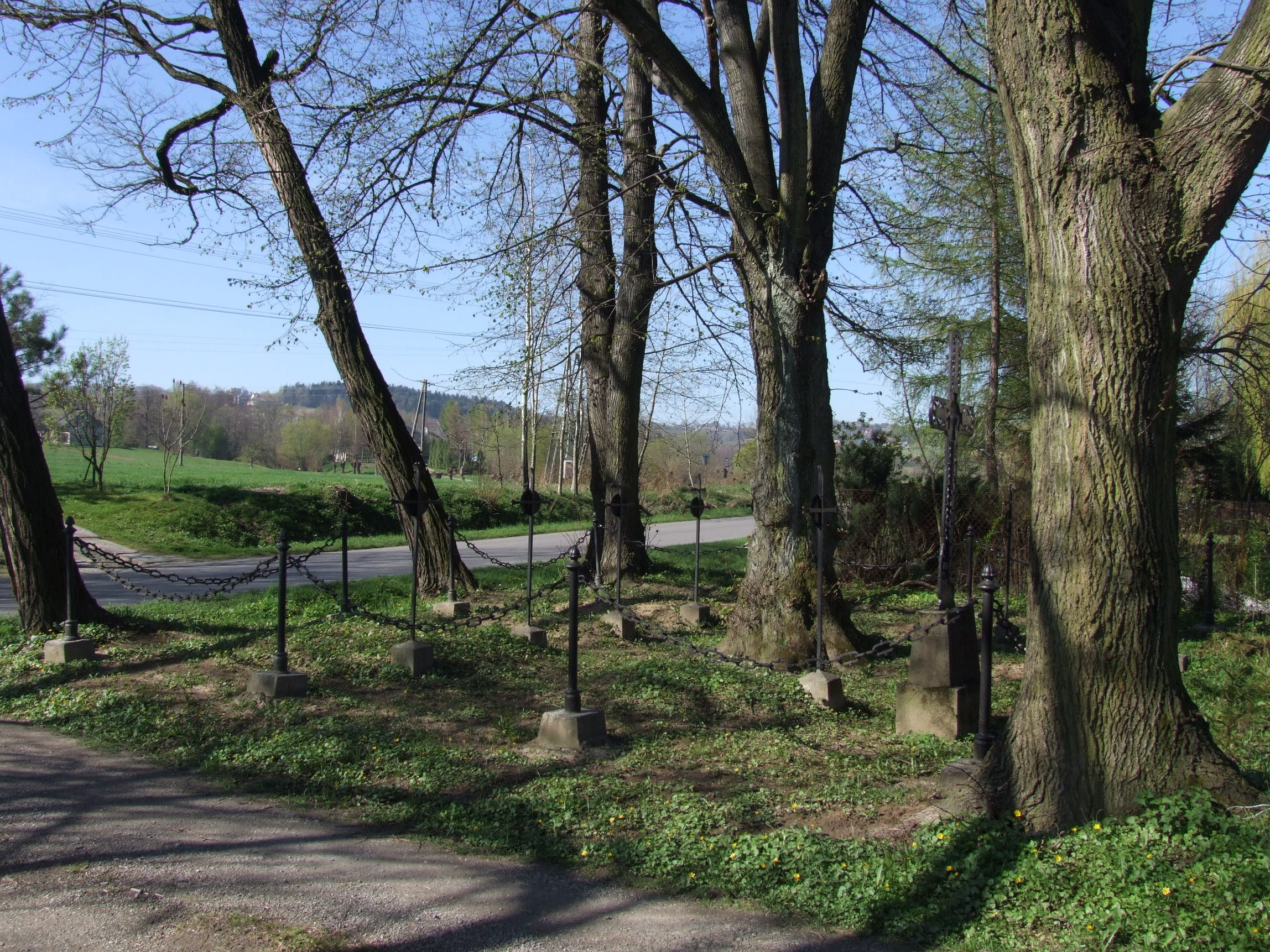
- War cemetery

- Location within Poland
- Coordinates: 49°50′06″N 20°15′34″E
- Country: Poland
- Voivodeship: Lesser Poland
- County: Bochnia
- Gmina: Łapanów

Kępanów [kɛmˈpanuf] is a village in the administrative district of Gmina Łapanów, within Bochnia County, Lesser Poland Voivodeship, in southern Poland.
