= Skrzynka, Myślenice County =

Skrzynka
- Village
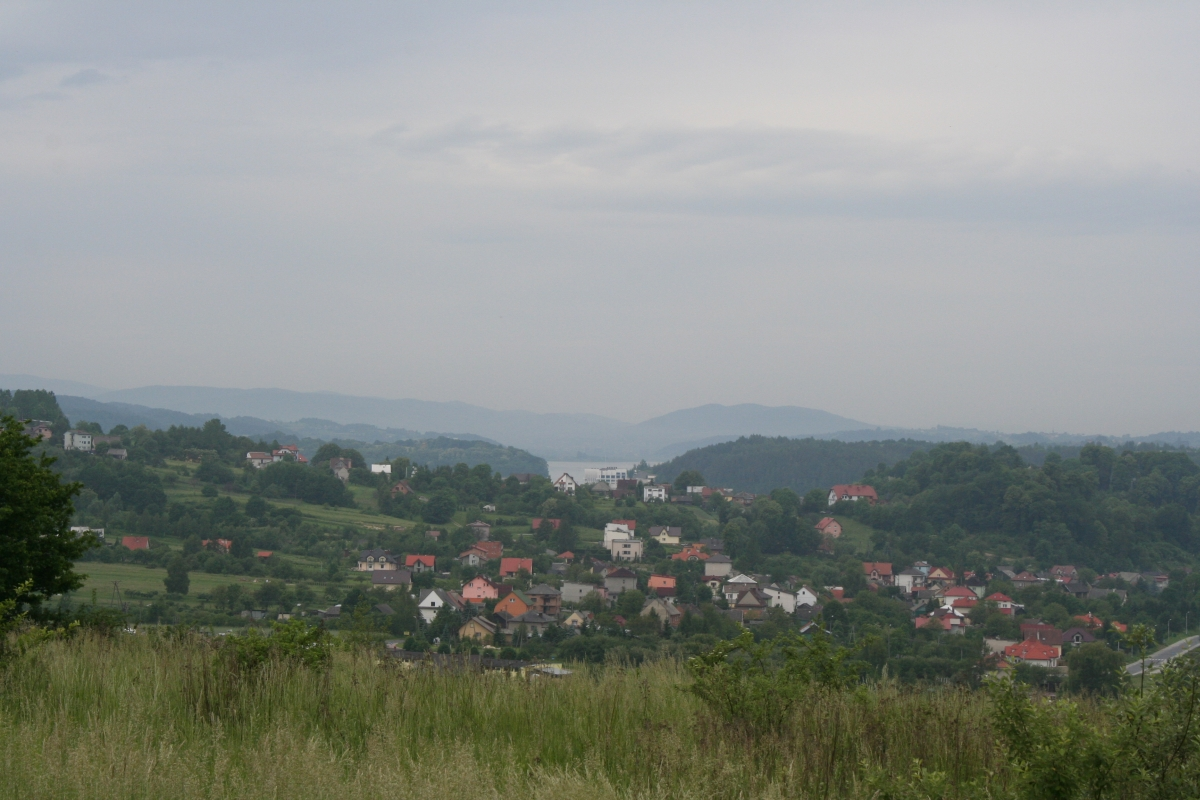

- Location within Poland
- Coordinates: 49°53′N 20°8′E
- Country: Poland
- Voivodeship: Lesser Poland
- County: Myślenice
- Gmina: Dobczyce
- Population: 600

Skrzynka [ˈskʂɨŋka] is a village in the administrative district of Gmina Dobczyce, within Myślenice County, Lesser Poland Voivodeship, in southern Poland.
