= Zbydniów, Lesser Poland Voivodeship =

Zbydniów
- Village
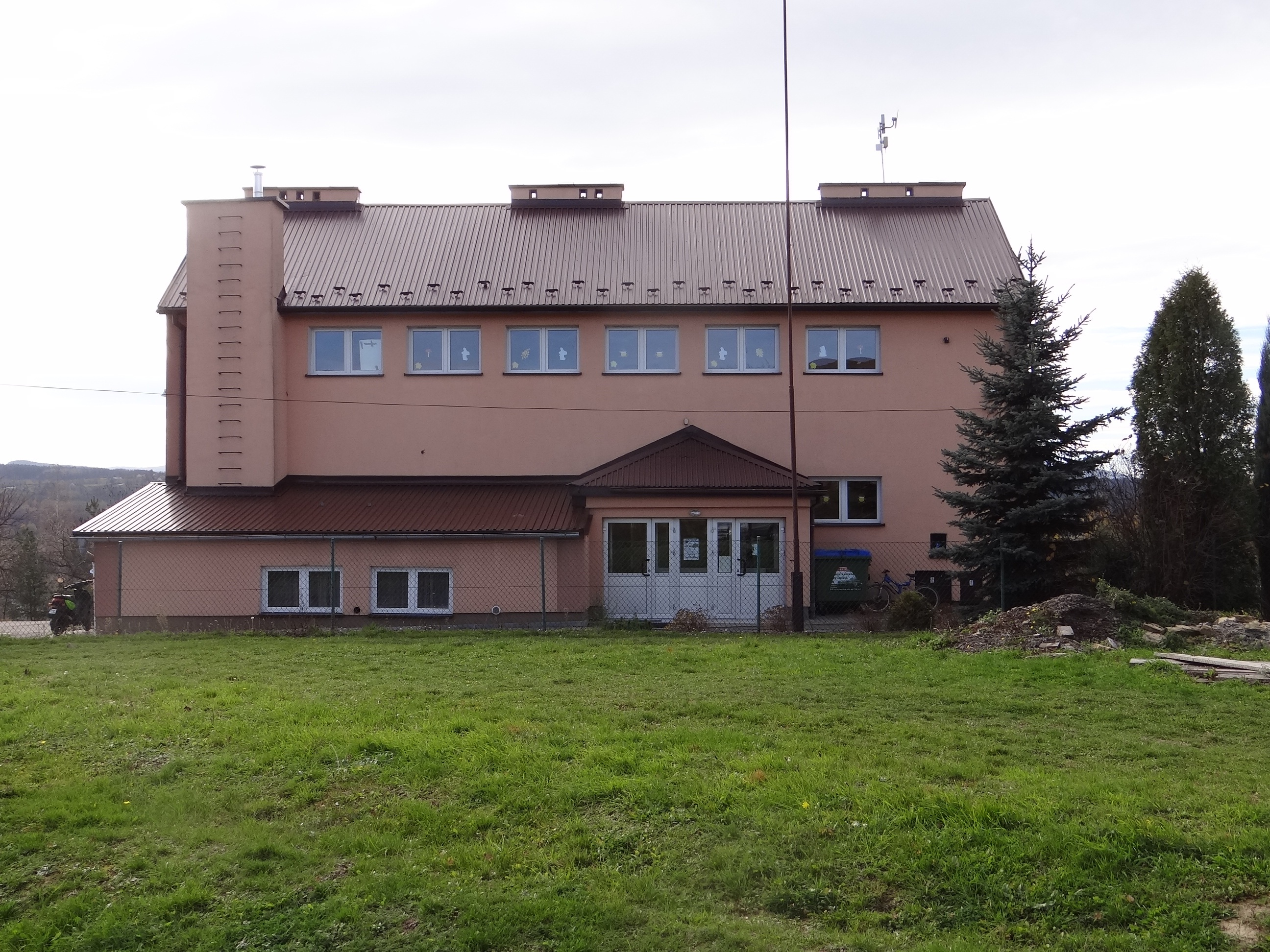
- School

- Location within Poland
- Coordinates: 49°50′N 20°19′E
- Country: Poland
- Voivodeship: Lesser Poland
- County: Bochnia
- Gmina: Łapanów
- Population: 544

Zbydniów [ˈzbɨdɲuf] is a village in the administrative district of Gmina Łapanów, within Bochnia County, Lesser Poland Voivodeship, in southern Poland.
