= Kobylec, Lesser Poland Voivodeship =

Kobylec
- Village
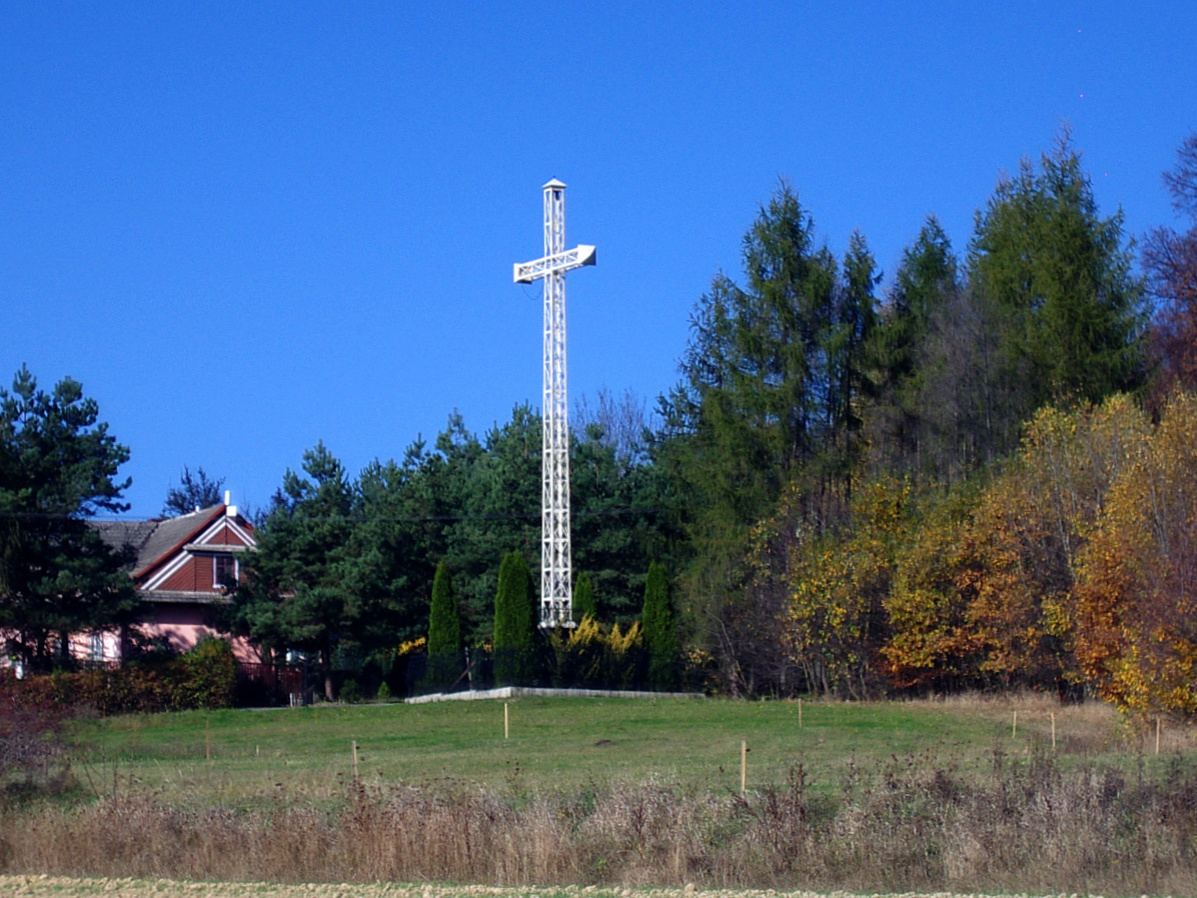
- Cross in Kobylec

- Location within Poland
- Coordinates: 49°52′35″N 20°17′06″E
- Country: Poland
- Voivodeship: Lesser Poland
- County: Bochnia
- Gmina: Łapanów

Kobylec [kɔˈbɨlɛt͡s] is a village in the administrative district of Gmina Łapanów, within Bochnia County, Lesser Poland Voivodeship, in southern Poland.
