= Grabie, Bochnia County =

Grabie
- Village
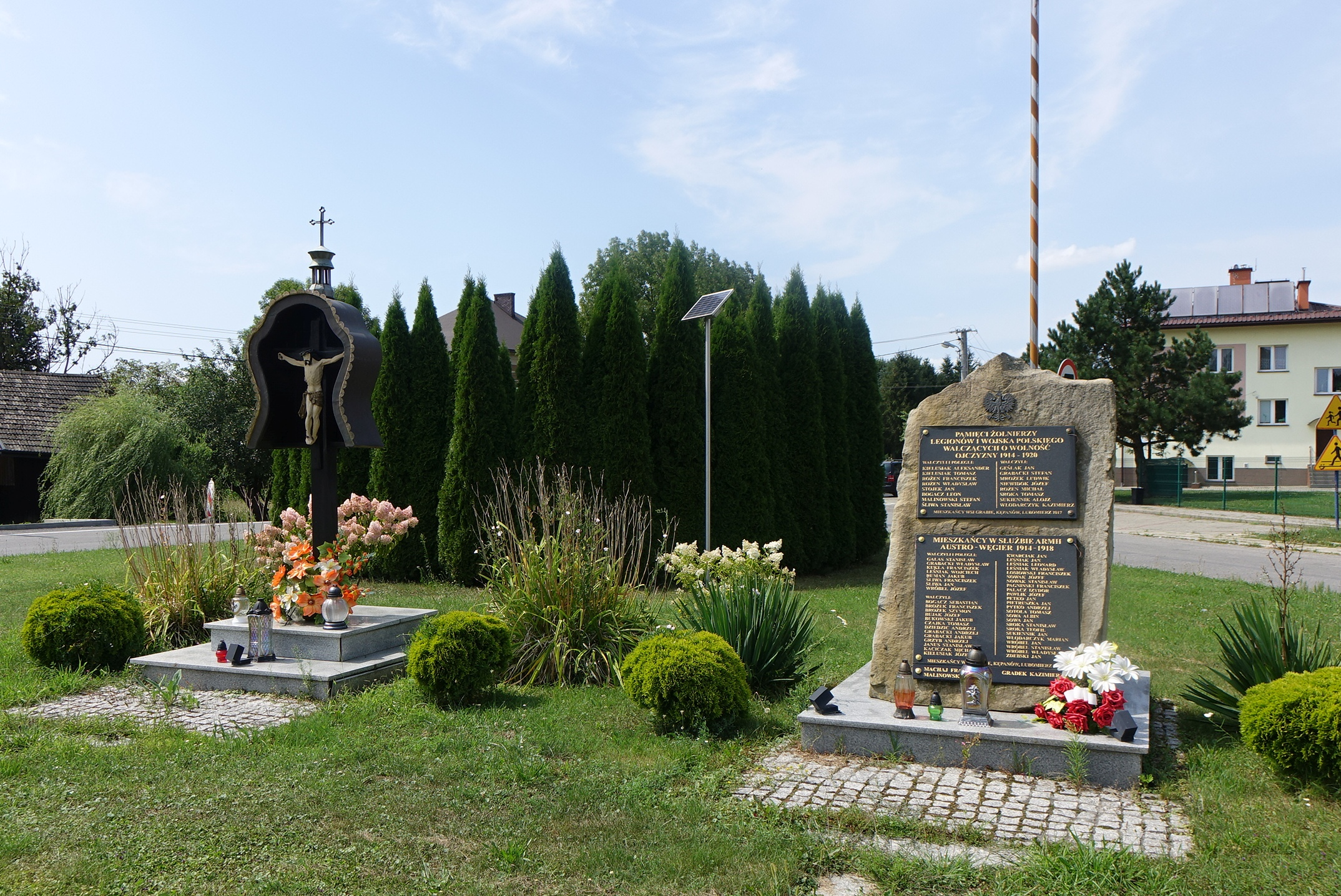
- Monument to the Polish Legions and the Austro-Hungarian Army

- Location within Poland
- Coordinates: 49°51′N 20°16′E
- Country: Poland
- Voivodeship: Lesser Poland
- County: Bochnia
- Gmina: Łapanów

Grabie [ˈɡrabjɛ] is a village in the administrative district of Gmina Łapanów, within Bochnia County, Lesser Poland Voivodeship, in southern Poland.
