= Sieraków, Lesser Poland Voivodeship =

Sieraków
- Village
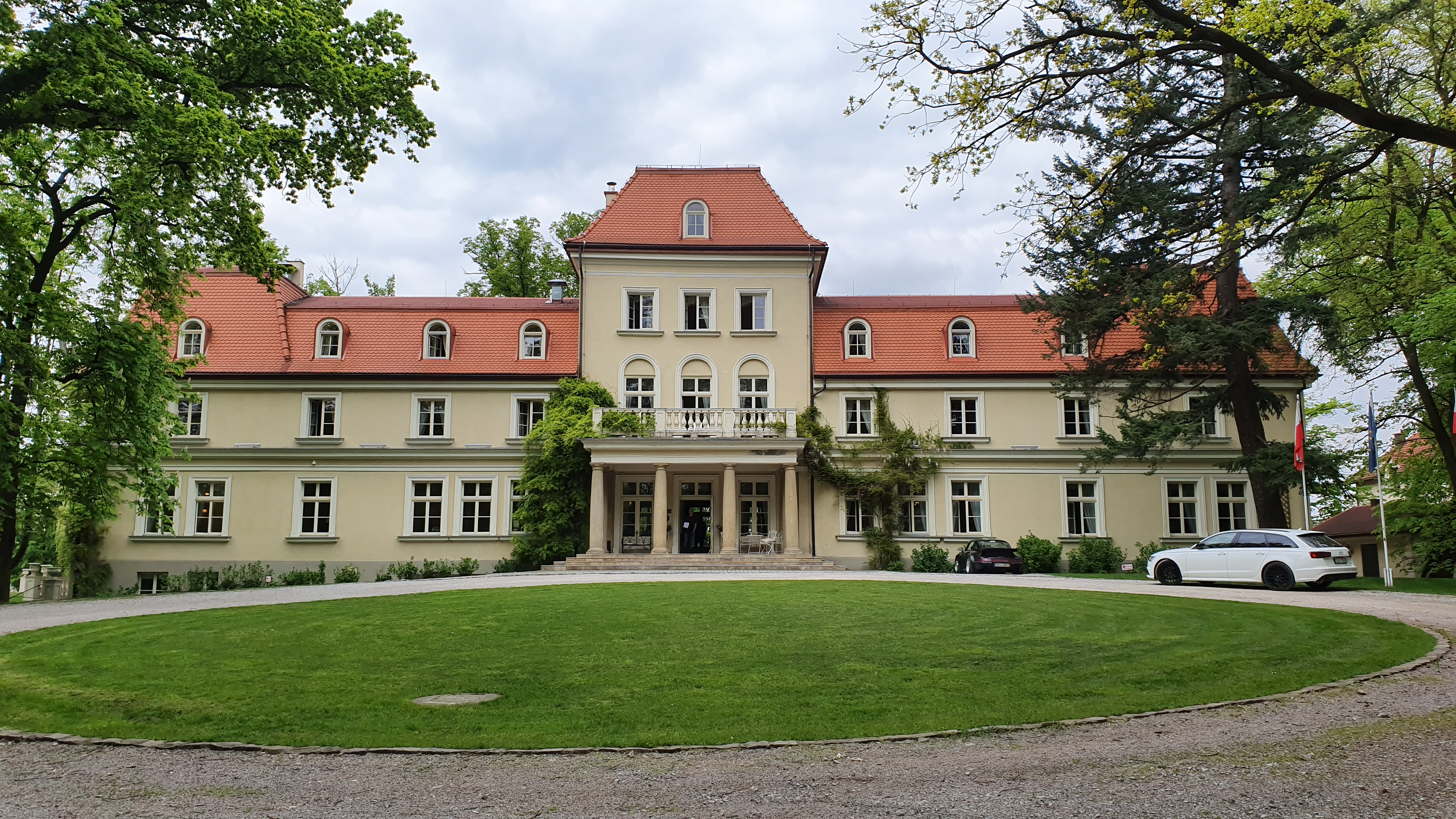
- Manor house

- Location within Poland
- Coordinates: 49°55′N 20°4′E
- Country: Poland
- Voivodeship: Lesser Poland
- County: Myślenice
- Gmina: Dobczyce

Sieraków (Polish pronunciation: [ɕɛˈrakuf]) is a village in the administrative district of Gmina Dobczyce, within Myślenice County, Lesser Poland Voivodeship, in southern Poland.
