= Łapanów =

- Village
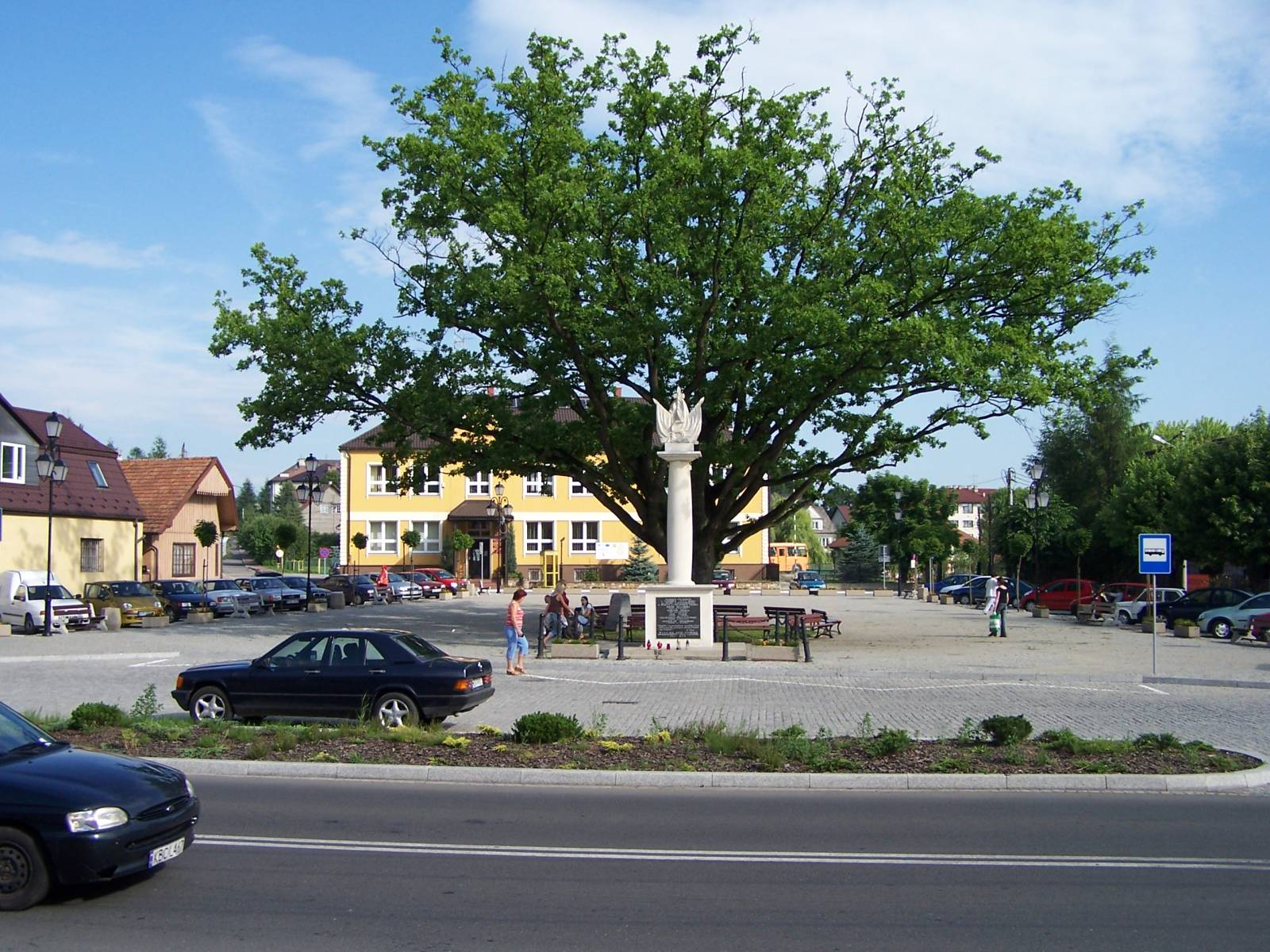
- Market square

- Location within Poland
- Coordinates: 49°52′N 20°18′E
- Country: Poland
- Voivodeship: Lesser Poland
- County: Bochnia
- Gmina: Łapanów
- Website: http://www.lapanow.pl

Łapanów [waˈpanuf] is a village in Bochnia County, Lesser Poland Voivodeship, in southern Poland. It is the seat of the gmina (administrative district) called Gmina Łapanów.
