= Gmina Dobczyce =

Gmina Dobczyce Dobczyce Commune
- Gmina
- Coat of arms
- Interactive map of Gmina Dobczyce
- Coordinates (Dobczyce): 49°54′N 20°6′E
- Country: Poland
- Voivodeship: Lesser Poland
- County: Myślenice
- Seat: Dobczyce

Area
  - Total: 66.63 km^{2} (25.73 sq mi)

Population (2006)
  - Total: 13,941
  - Density: 209.2/km^{2} (541.9/sq mi)
  - Urban: 6,028
  - Rural: 7,913
- Website: http://www.dobczyce.pl/

Gmina Dobczyce is an urban-rural gmina (administrative district) in Myślenice County, Lesser Poland Voivodeship, in southern Poland. Its seat is the town of Dobczyce, which lies approximately 15 kilometres (9 mi) north-east of Myślenice and 22 km (14 mi) south-east of the regional capital Kraków.

The gmina covers an area of 66.63 square kilometres (25.7 sq mi), and as of 2006 its total population is 13,941 (out of which the population of Dobczyce amounts to 6,028, and the population of the rural part of the gmina is 7,913).

== Villages ==
Apart from the town of Dobczyce, Gmina Dobczyce contains the villages and settlements of Bieńkowice, Brzączowice, Brzezowa, Dziekanowice, Kędzierzynka, Kornatka, Niezdów, Nowa Wieś, Rudnik, Sieraków, Skrzynka, Stadniki and Stojowice.

== Neighbouring gminas ==
Gmina Dobczyce is bordered by the gminas of Gdów, Myślenice, Raciechowice, Siepraw, Wieliczka and Wiśniowa.
