= Niezdów, Lesser Poland Voivodeship =

Niezdów
- Village
- Location within Poland
- Coordinates: 49°53′20″N 20°06′47″E
- Country: Poland
- Voivodeship: Lesser Poland
- County: Myślenice
- Gmina: Dobczyce

Niezdów [ˈɲɛzduf] is a village in the administrative district of Gmina Dobczyce, within Myślenice County, Lesser Poland Voivodeship, in southern Poland.
