= Cichawka =

- Village
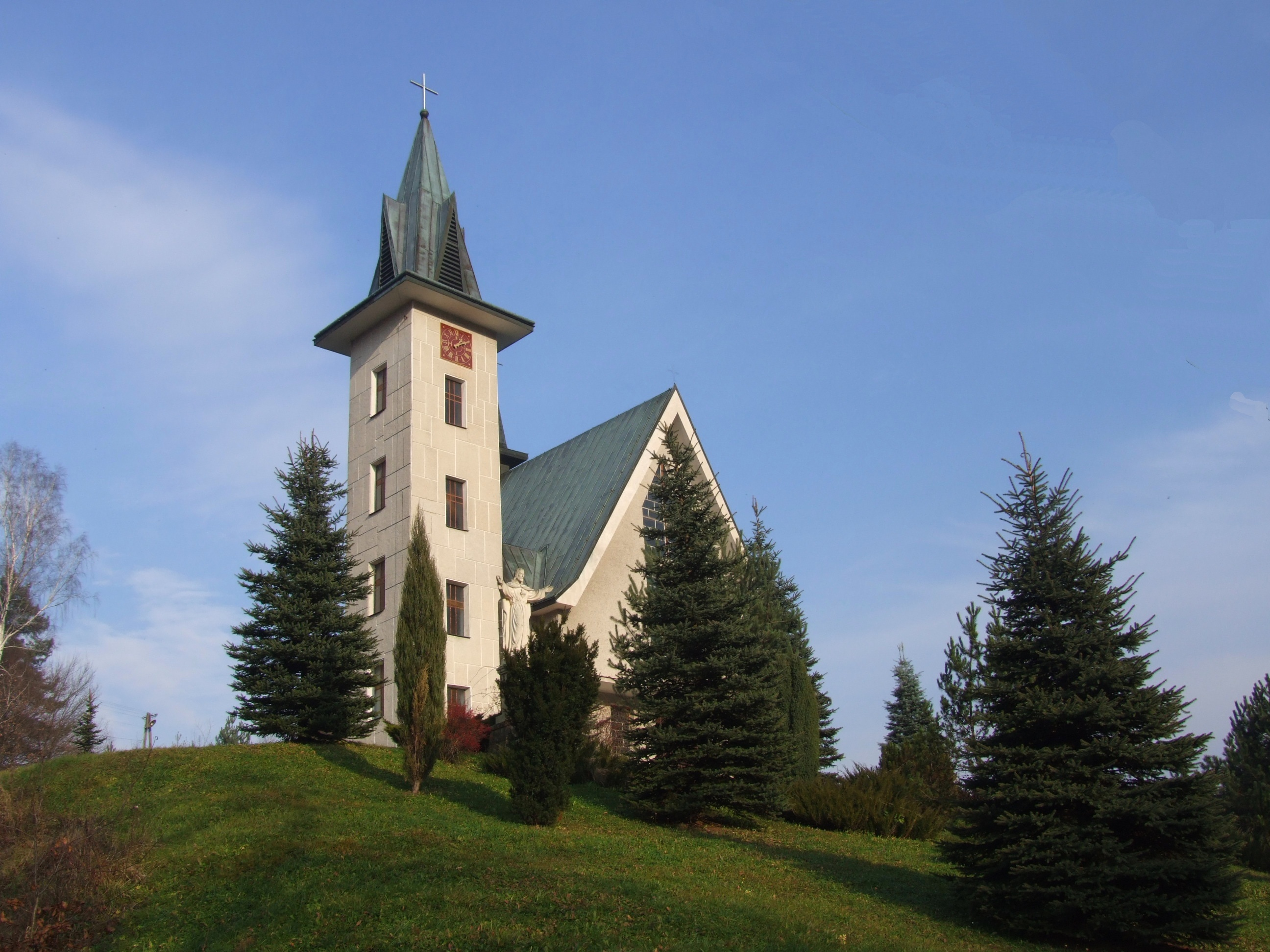
- Catholic church

- Location within Poland
- Coordinates: 49°53′N 20°22′E
- Country: Poland
- Voivodeship: Lesser Poland
- County: Bochnia
- Gmina: Łapanów

Cichawka [t͡ɕiˈxafka] is a village in the administrative district of Gmina Łapanów, within Bochnia County, Lesser Poland Voivodeship, in southern Poland.
