= Nowa Wieś, Myślenice County =

Nowa Wieś
- Village
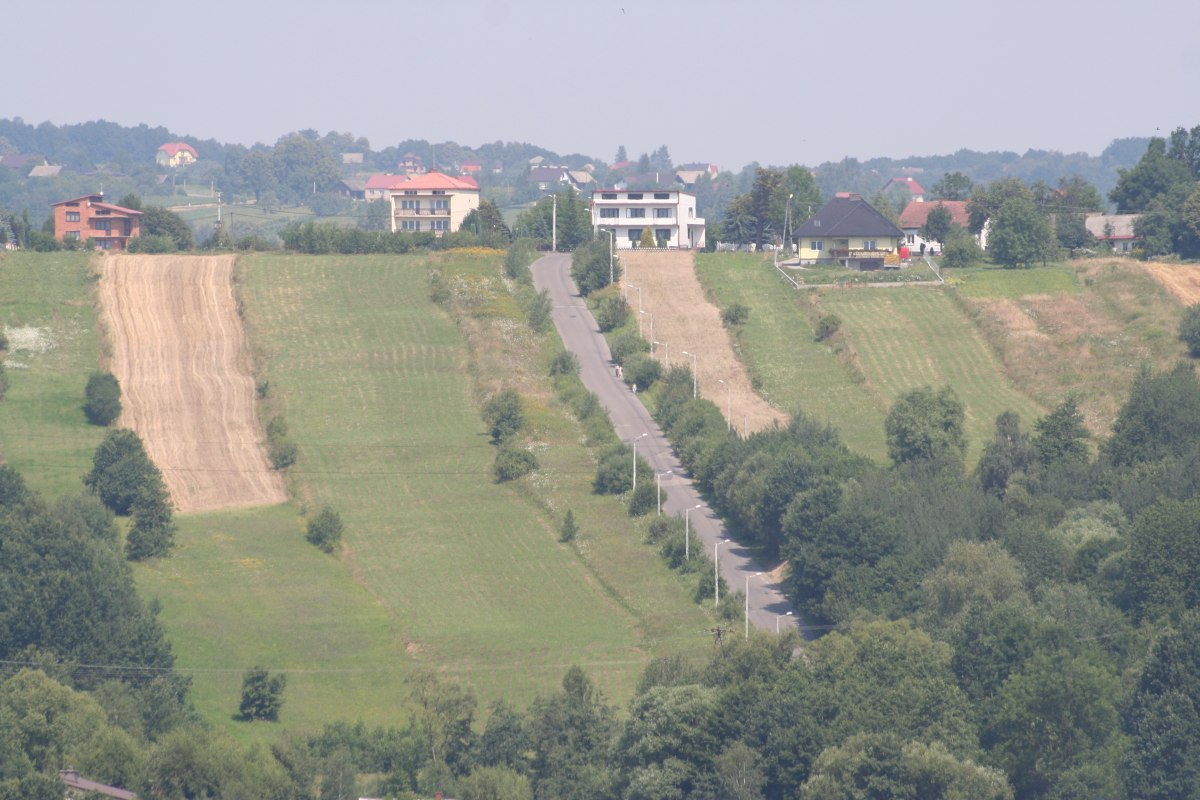

- Location within Poland
- Coordinates: 49°54′N 20°4′E
- Country: Poland
- Voivodeship: Lesser Poland
- County: Myślenice
- Gmina: Dobczyce

Nowa Wieś [ˈnɔva ˈvjɛɕ] is a village in the administrative district of Gmina Dobczyce, within Myślenice County, Lesser Poland Voivodeship, in southern Poland.
