= Wola Wieruszycka =

- Village
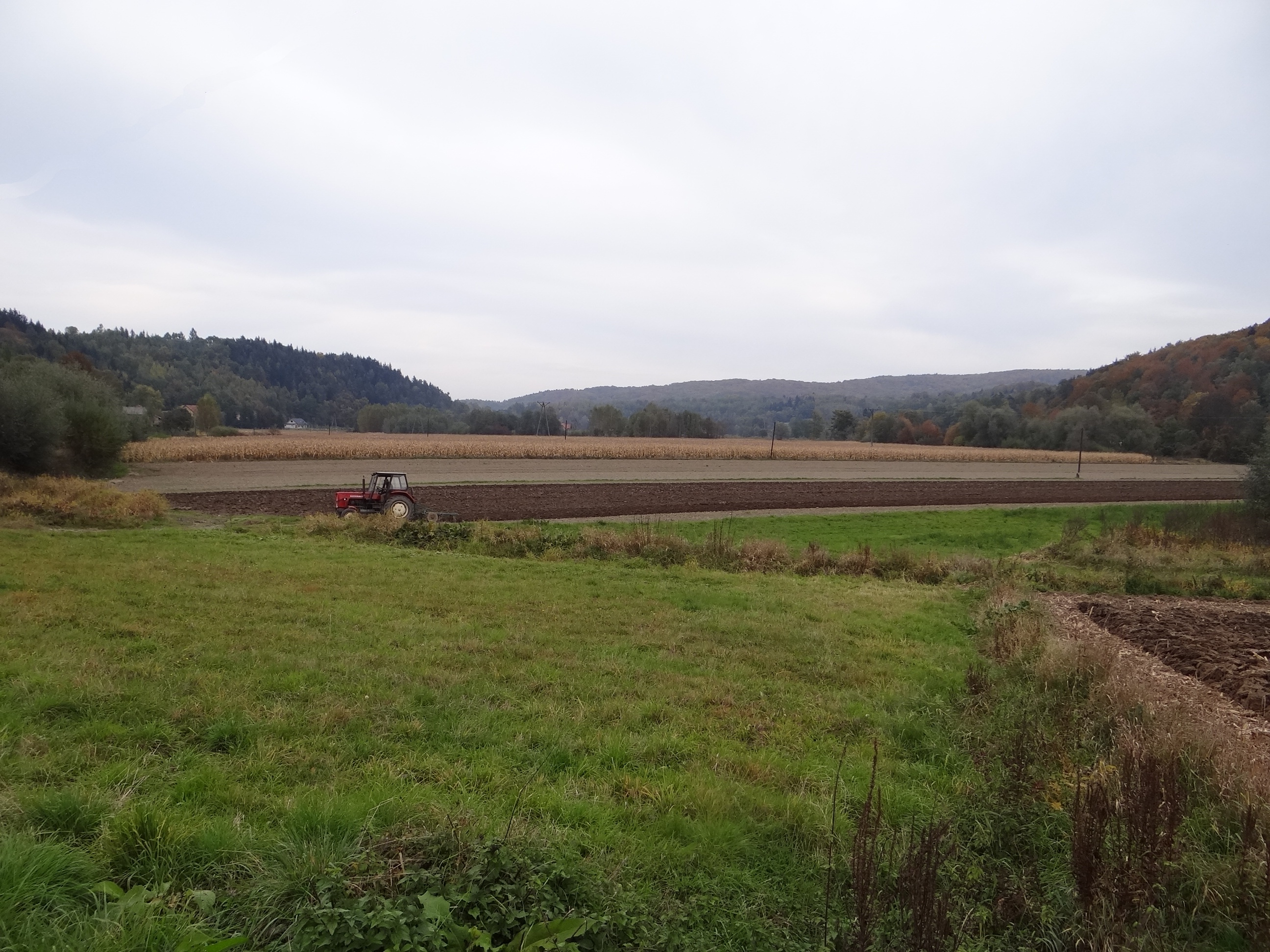

- Location within Poland
- Coordinates: 49°53′N 20°19′E
- Country: Poland
- Voivodeship: Lesser Poland
- County: Bochnia
- Gmina: Łapanów

Wola Wieruszycka [ˈvɔla vjɛruˈʂɨt͡ska] is a village in the administrative district of Gmina Łapanów, within Bochnia County, Lesser Poland Voivodeship, in southern Poland.
