= Stadniki, Lesser Poland Voivodeship =

Stadniki
- Village
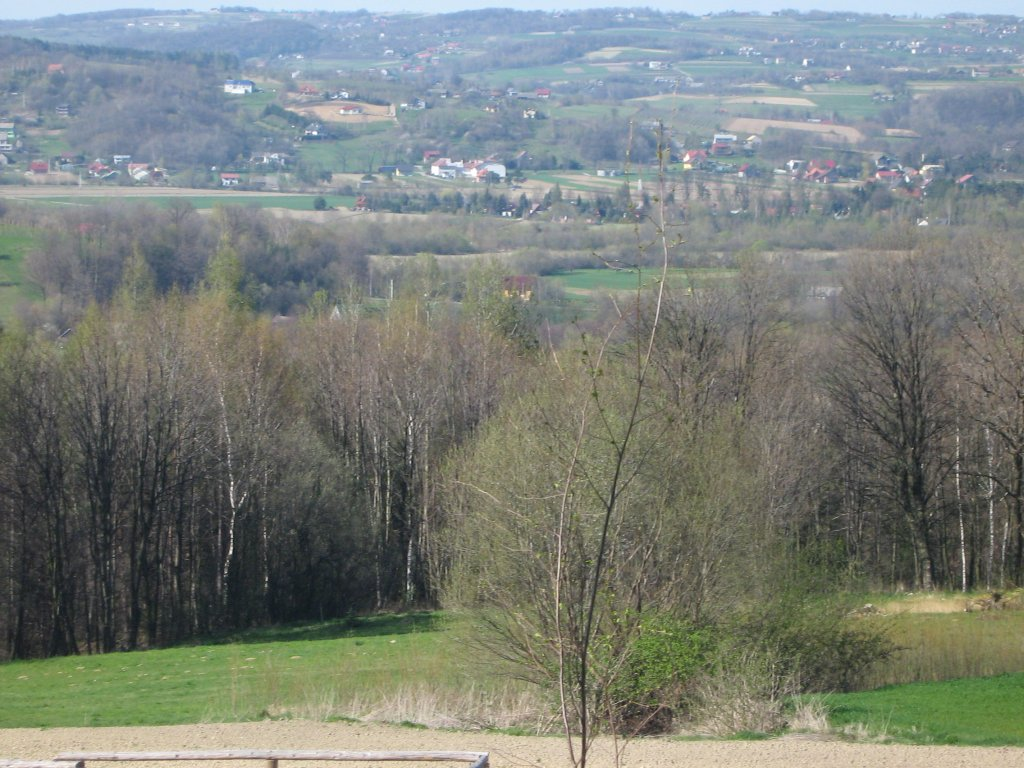

- Location within Poland
- Coordinates: 49°53′6″N 20°9′30″E
- Country: Poland
- Voivodeship: Lesser Poland
- County: Myślenice
- Gmina: Dobczyce
- Population: 820

Stadniki [stadˈniki] is a village in the administrative district of Gmina Dobczyce, within Myślenice County, Lesser Poland Voivodeship, in southern Poland.
