= Tarnawa =

Tarnawa may refer to:

== Places ==
- Tarnawa, Lesser Poland Voivodeship, Poland
- Tarnawa, Lubusz Voivodeship, Poland
- Tarnawa, Świętokrzyskie Voivodeship, Poland

== Other uses ==
- Tarnawa (horse), a racehorse
