= Sobolów =

- Village
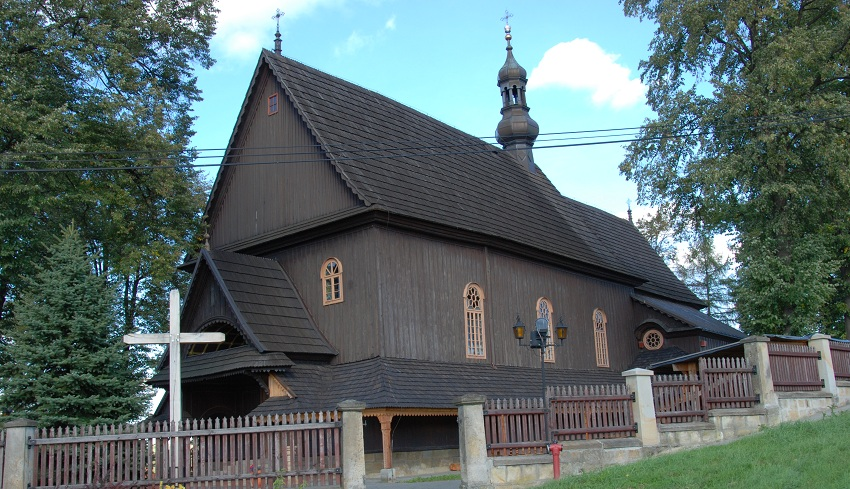
- All Saint and Saint Mary Church

- Location within Poland
- Coordinates: 49°55′N 20°21′E
- Country: Poland
- Voivodeship: Lesser Poland
- County: Bochnia
- Gmina: Łapanów

Sobolów [sɔˈbɔluf] is a village in the administrative district of Gmina Łapanów, within Bochnia County, Lesser Poland Voivodeship, in southern Poland.
