= Rudnik, Gmina Dobczyce =

Rudnik
- Village
- Location within Poland
- Coordinates: 49°54′40″N 20°6′24″E
- Country: Poland
- Voivodeship: Lesser Poland
- County: Myślenice
- Gmina: Dobczyce

Rudnik (Polish pronunciation: [ˈrudɲik]) is a village in the administrative district of Gmina Dobczyce, within Myślenice County, Lesser Poland Voivodeship, in southern Poland.
