= Wieruszyce =

- Village
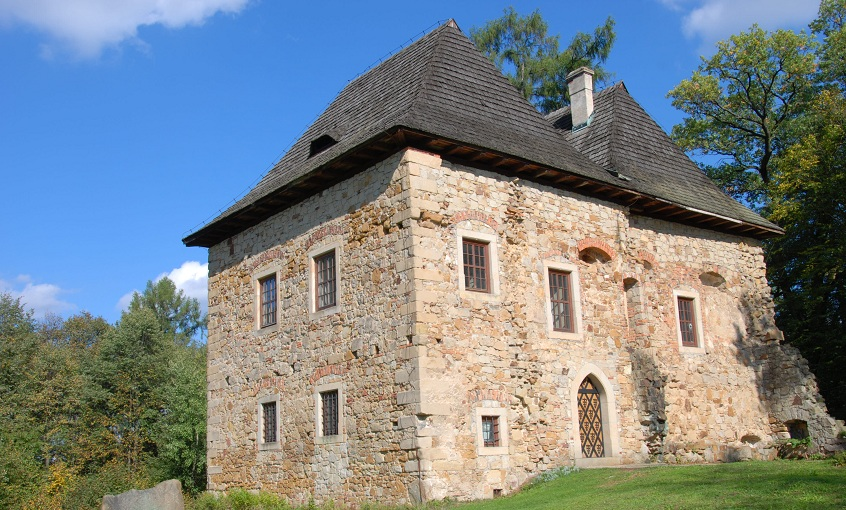
- Old manor house

- Location within Poland
- Coordinates: 49°51′N 20°19′E
- Country: Poland
- Voivodeship: Lesser Poland
- County: Bochnia
- Gmina: Łapanów

Wieruszyce [vjɛruˈʂɨt͡sɛ] is a village in the administrative district of Gmina Łapanów, within Bochnia County, Lesser Poland Voivodeship, in southern Poland.

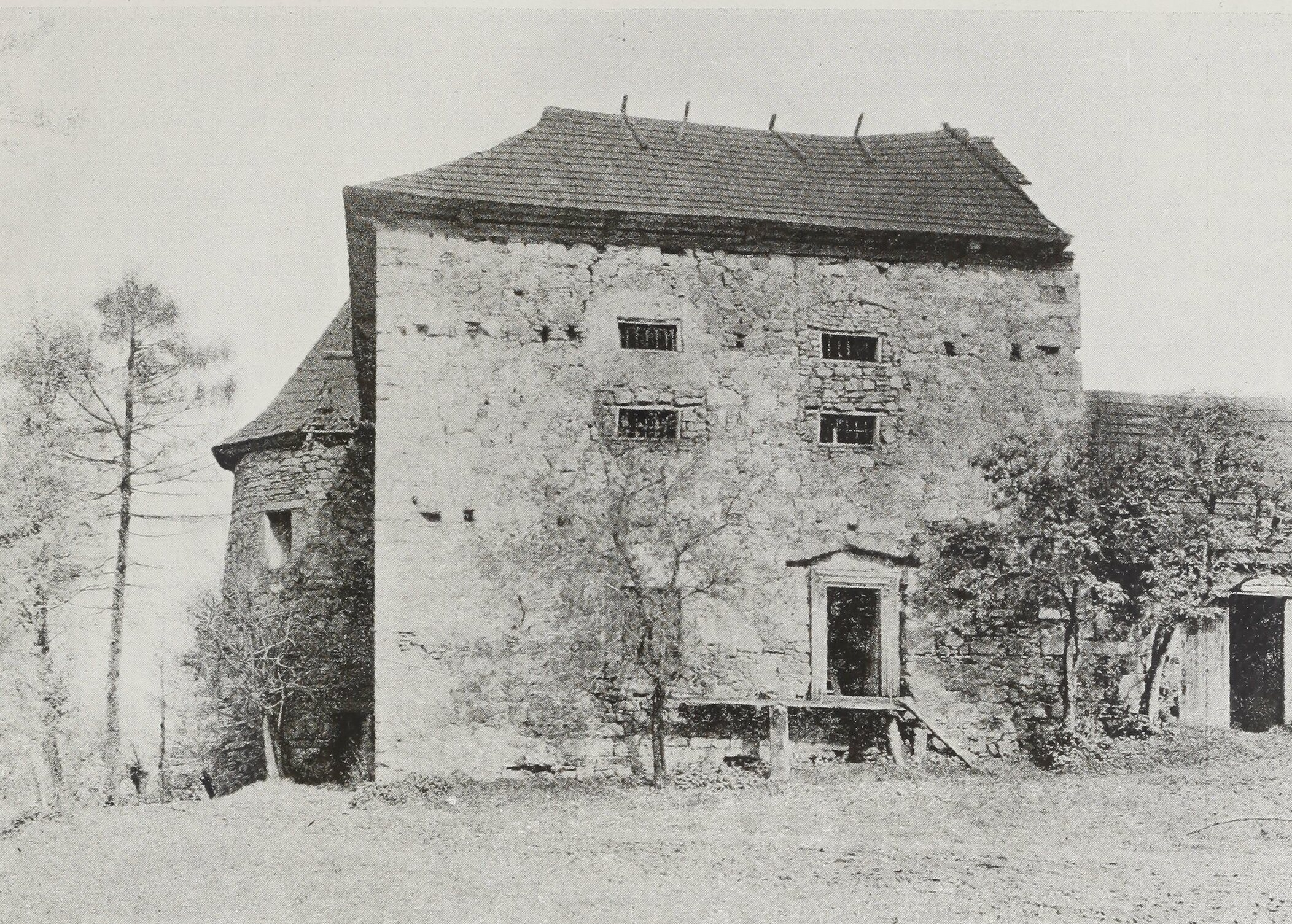
Manor house in Wieruszyce before 1930
