= Tarnawa, Lesser Poland Voivodeship =

Tarnawa
- Village
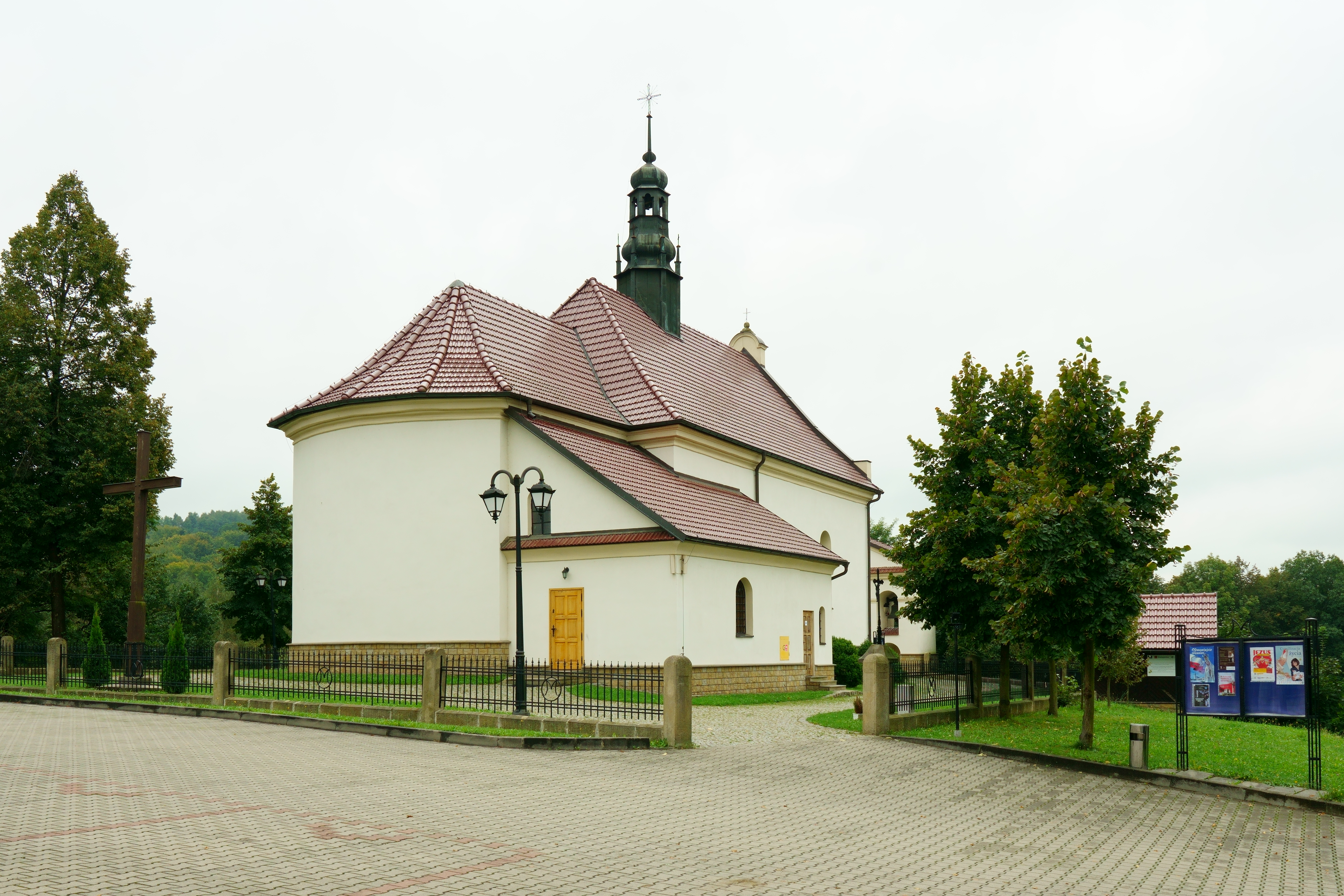
- Catholic church

- Location within Poland
- Coordinates: 49°50′N 20°18′E
- Country: Poland
- Voivodeship: Lesser Poland
- County: Bochnia
- Gmina: Łapanów

Tarnawa [tarˈnava] is a village in the administrative district of Gmina Łapanów, within Bochnia County, Lesser Poland Voivodeship, in southern Poland. Tarnawa had previously been in the Tarnów Voivodeship (1975–1998).
