= Kamyk, Lesser Poland Voivodeship =

Kamyk
- Village
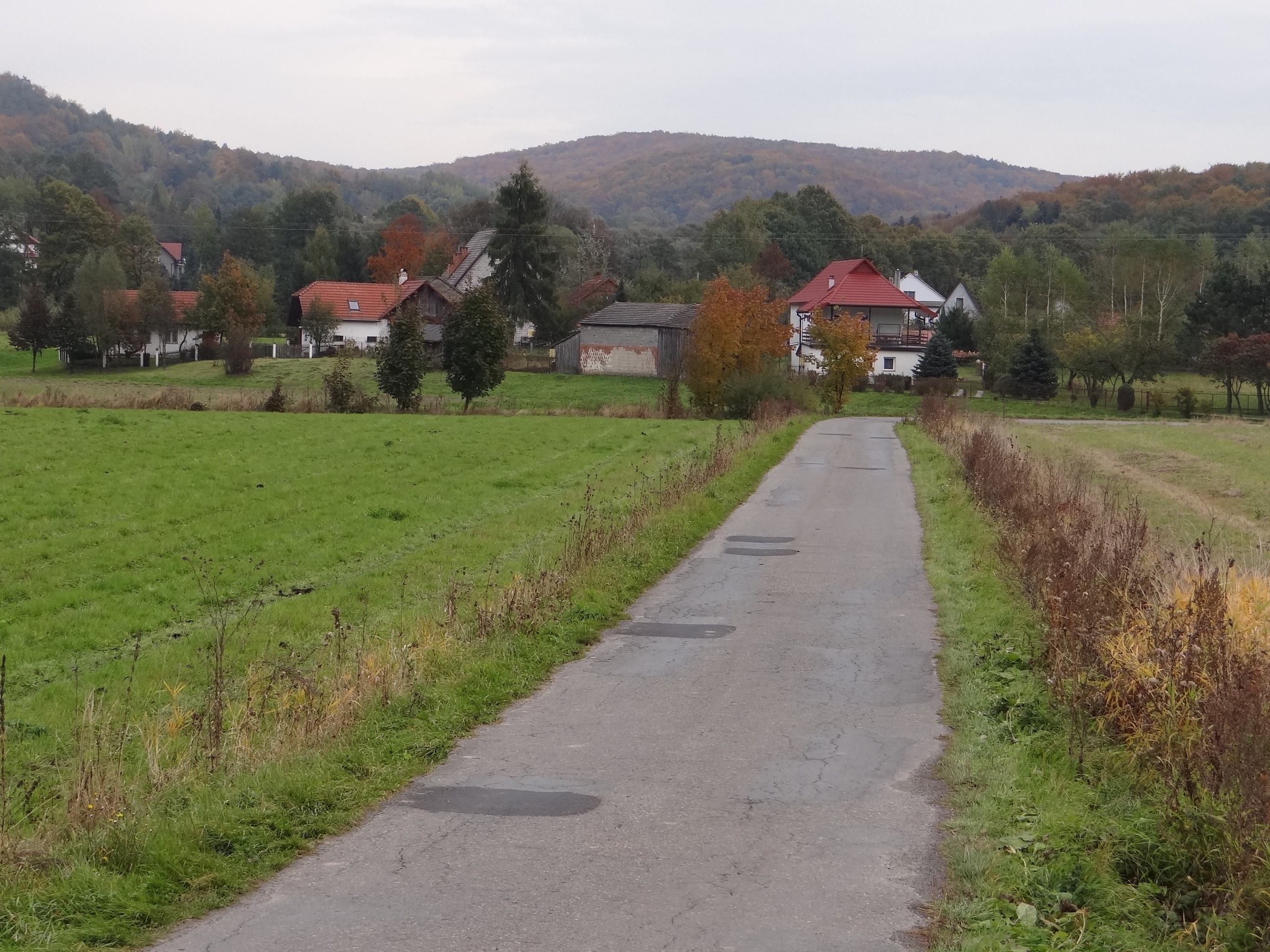

- Location within Poland
- Coordinates: 49°54′N 20°19′E
- Country: Poland
- Voivodeship: Lesser Poland
- County: Bochnia
- Gmina: Łapanów

Kamyk [ˈkamɨk] is a village in the administrative district of Gmina Łapanów, within Bochnia County, Lesser Poland Voivodeship, in southern Poland.
