= Lubomierz, Bochnia County =

Lubomierz
- Village
- Location within Poland
- Coordinates: 49°52′N 20°16′E
- Country: Poland
- Voivodeship: Lesser Poland
- County: Bochnia
- Gmina: Łapanów

Lubomierz ([luˈbɔmjɛʂ]) is a village in the administrative district of Gmina Łapanów, within Bochnia County, Lesser Poland Voivodeship, in southern Poland.
