= Brzezowa, Myślenice County =

Brzezowa
- Village
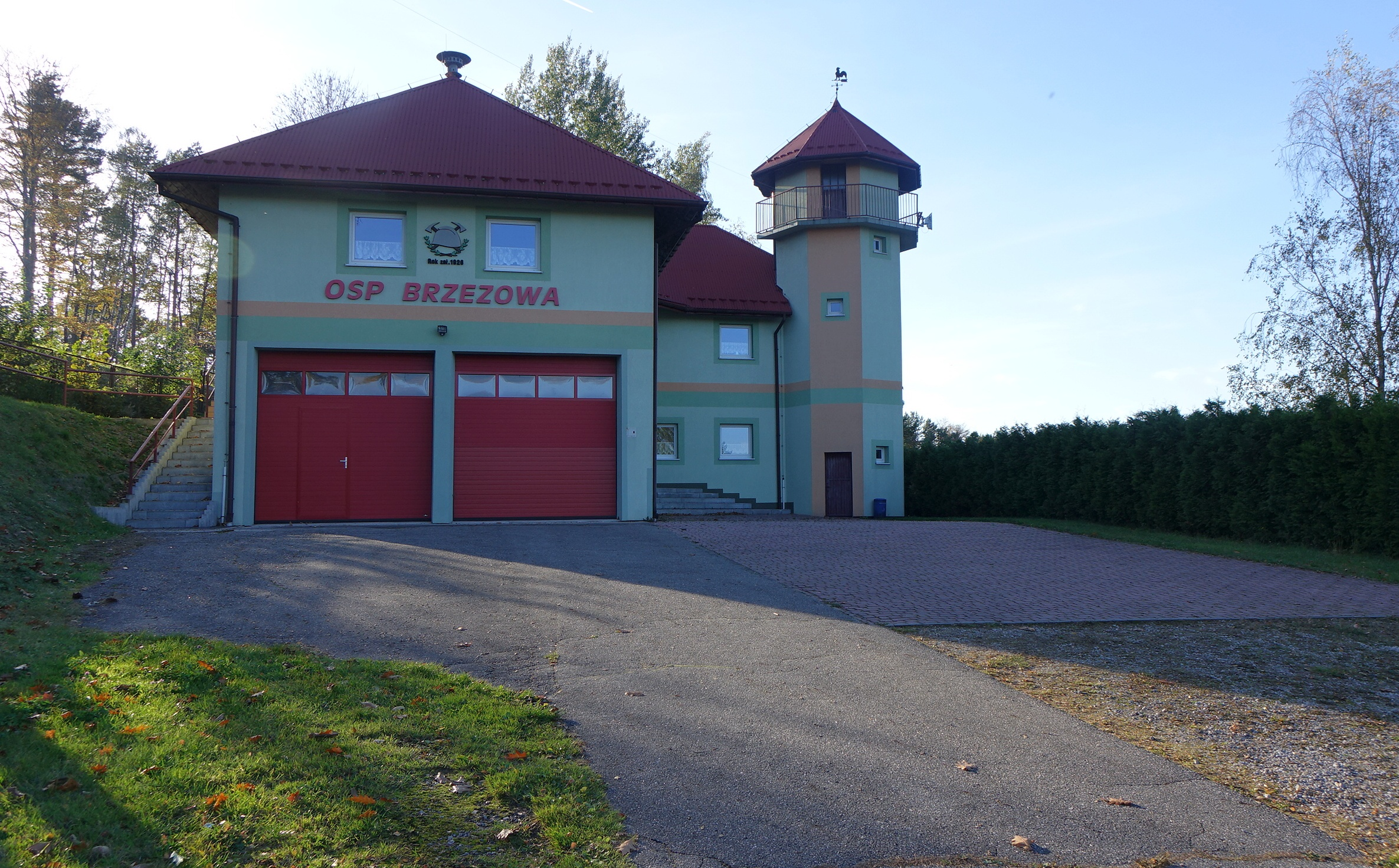
- Fire station

- Location within Poland
- Coordinates: 49°51′N 20°4′E
- Country: Poland
- Voivodeship: Lesser Poland
- County: Myślenice
- Gmina: Dobczyce
- Population: 750

Brzezowa [bʐɛˈzɔva] is a village in the administrative district of Gmina Dobczyce, within Myślenice County, Lesser Poland Voivodeship, in southern Poland.
