= Kornatka, Lesser Poland Voivodeship =

Kornatka
- Village
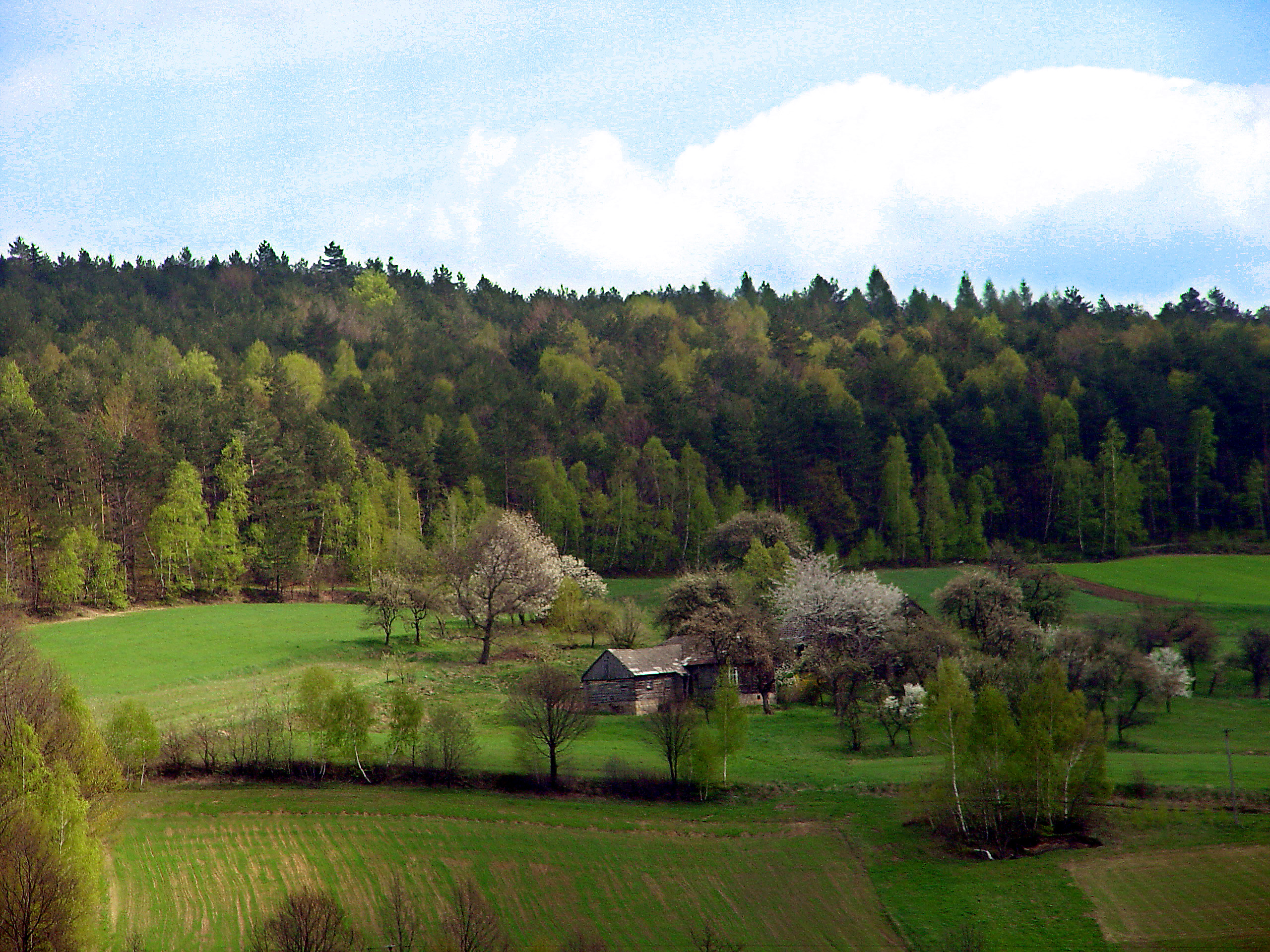

- Location within Poland
- Coordinates: 49°51′N 20°6′E
- Country: Poland
- Voivodeship: Lesser Poland
- County: Myślenice
- Gmina: Dobczyce

Kornatka [kɔrˈnatka] is a village in the administrative district of Gmina Dobczyce, within Myślenice County, Lesser Poland Voivodeship, in southern Poland.
