= Boczów, Lesser Poland Voivodeship =

Boczów
- Village
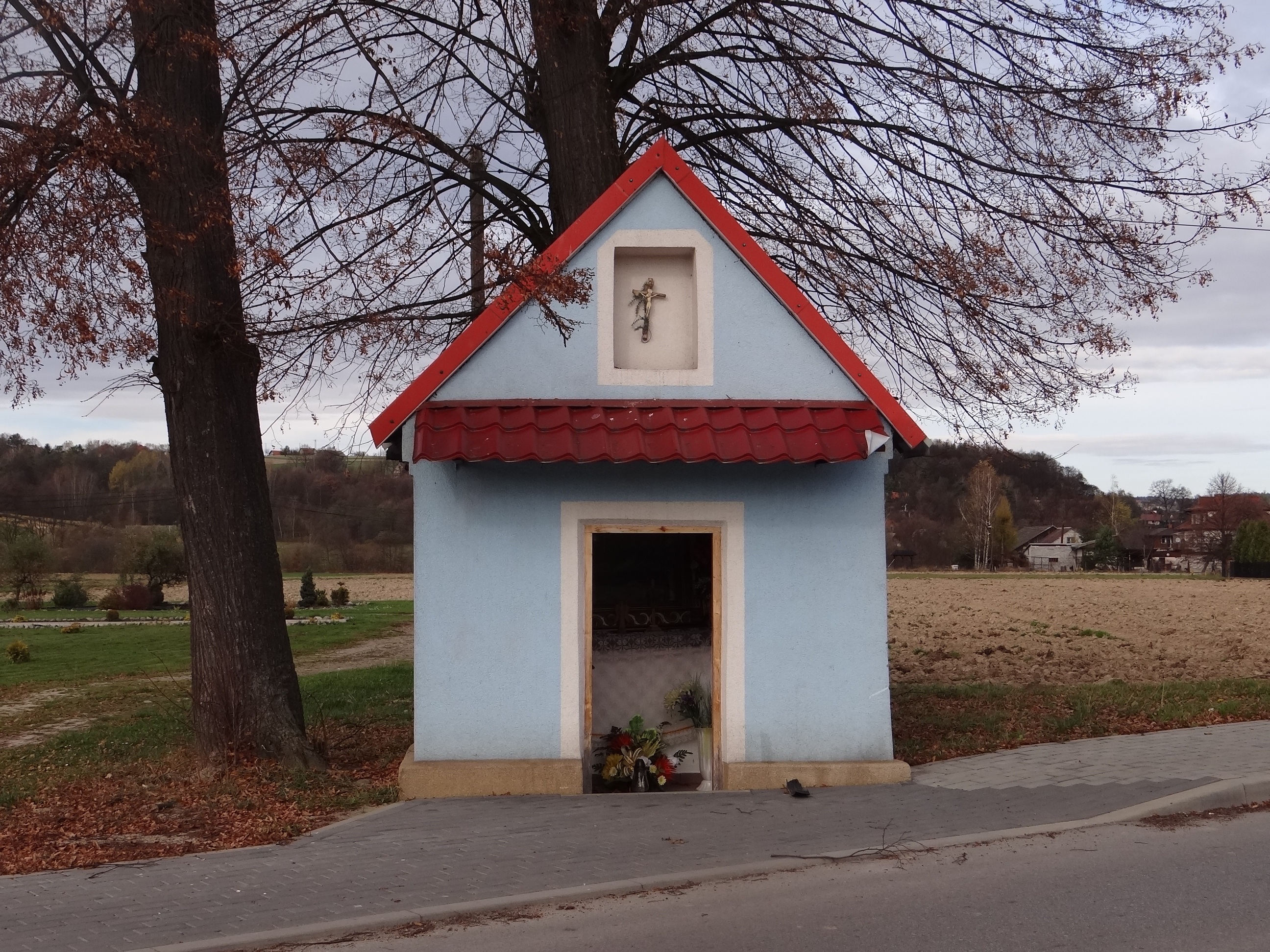
- Chapel

- Location within Poland
- Coordinates: 49°51′N 20°18′E
- Country: Poland
- Voivodeship: Lesser Poland
- County: Bochnia
- Gmina: Łapanów

Boczów [ˈbɔt͡ʂuf] is a village in the administrative district of Gmina Łapanów, within Bochnia County, Lesser Poland Voivodeship, in southern Poland.
