= Brzezowa, Bochnia County =

Brzezowa
- Village
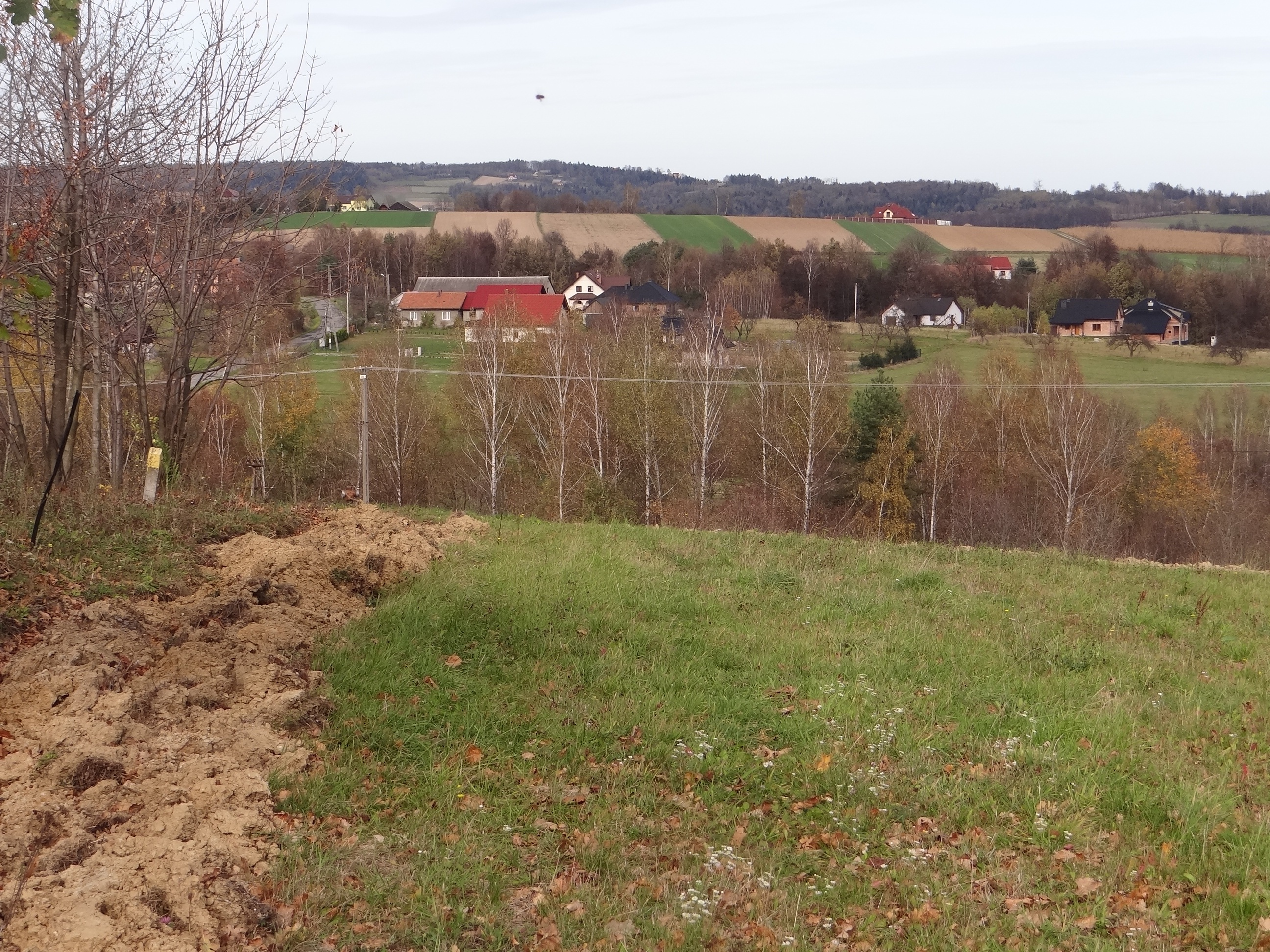

- Location within Poland
- Coordinates: 49°52′N 20°18′E
- Country: Poland
- Voivodeship: Lesser Poland
- County: Bochnia
- Gmina: Łapanów

Brzezowa [bʐɛˈzɔva] is a village in the administrative district of Gmina Łapanów, within Bochnia County, Lesser Poland Voivodeship, in southern Poland.
