= Kamýk (Litoměřice District) =

- Municipality
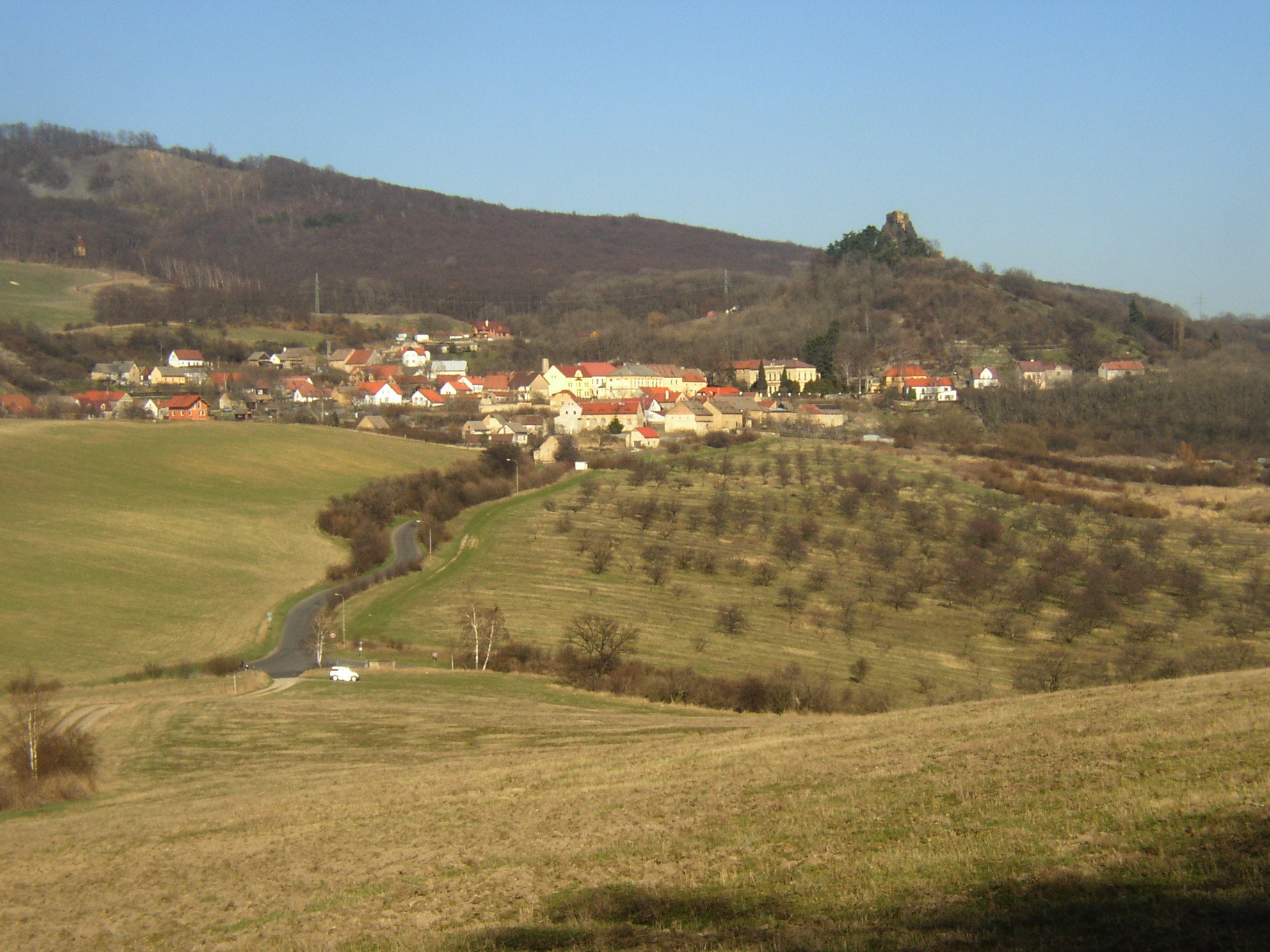
- Kamýk below the Kamýk castle ruin

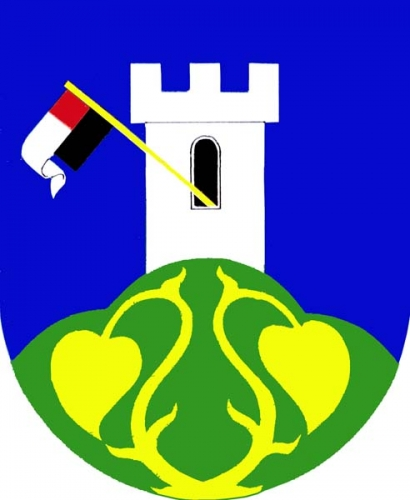
- Flag Coat of arms

- Location in the Czech Republic
- Coordinates: 50°33′30″N 14°4′39″E
- Country: Czech Republic
- Region: Ústí nad Labem
- District: Litoměřice
- First mentioned: 1319

Area
  - Total: 5.78 km^{2} (2.23 sq mi)
- Elevation: 301 m (988 ft)

Population (2026-01-01)
  - Total: 225
  - Density: 38.9/km^{2} (101/sq mi)
- Time zone: UTC+1 (CET)
  - Summer (DST): UTC+2 (CEST)
- Postal code: 412 01
- Website: www.obec-kamyk.cz

Kamýk (German: Kamaik) is a municipality and village in Litoměřice District in the Ústí nad Labem Region of the Czech Republic. It has about 200 inhabitants.

Kamýk lies approximately 5 kilometres (3 mi) north-west of Litoměřice, 11 km (7 mi) south of Ústí nad Labem, and 59 km (37 mi) north-west of Prague.

== Demographics ==
Historical population
Year	Pop.	±%
1869	441	—
1880	400	−9.3%
1890	368	−8.0%
1900	352	−4.3%
1910	374	+6.2%
1921	361	−3.5%
1930	407	+12.7%
1950	250	−38.6%
1961	219	−12.4%
1970	195	−11.0%
1980	161	−17.4%
1991	119	−26.1%
2001	123	+3.4%
2011	181	+47.2%
2021	180	−0.6%
Source: Censuses
