= Pogwizdów =

Pogwizdów may refer to the following places in Poland:

- Pogwizdów, Lower Silesian Voivodeship (south-west Poland)
- Pogwizdów, Silesian Voivodeship (south Poland)
- Pogwizdów, Bochnia County in Lesser Poland Voivodeship (south Poland)
- Pogwizdów, Miechów County in Lesser Poland Voivodeship (south Poland)
- Pogwizdów, Subcarpathian Voivodeship (south-east Poland)
