= Niepołomice Forest =

Forest complex in western part of Sandomierz Basin, Poland

Coordinates: 50°02′25″N 20°22′13″E

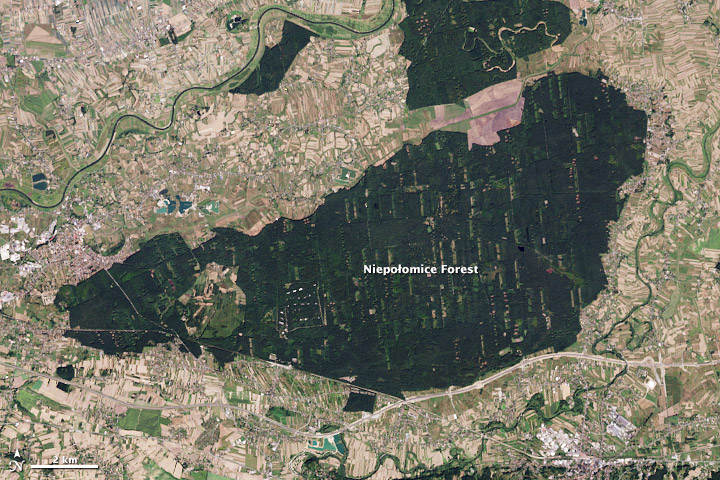
Since the 1200s it has been a forest of special use and protection in Poland. In this view from space, different coloration can indicate different functions.

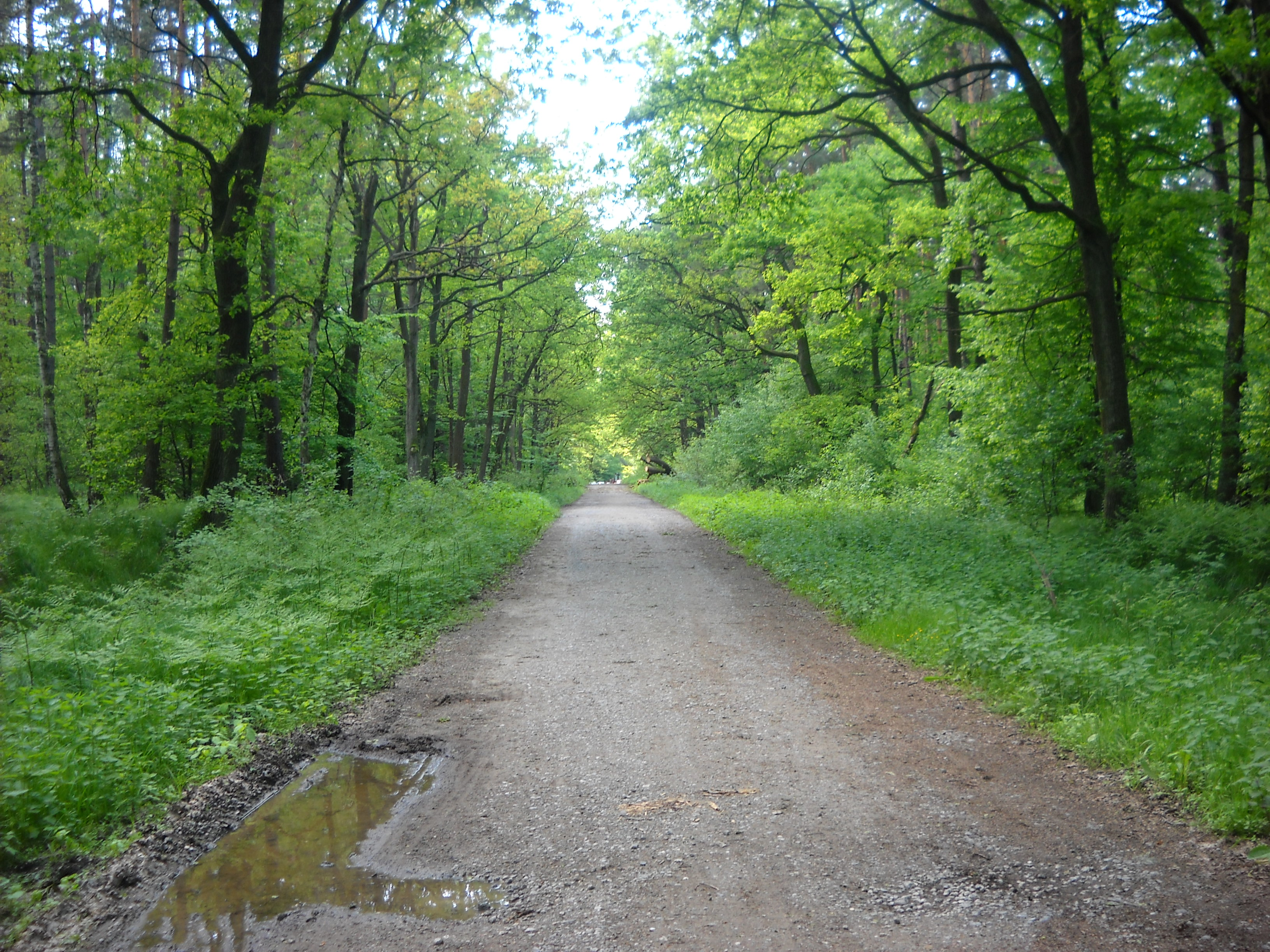
Niepołomice Forest support road in May 2010

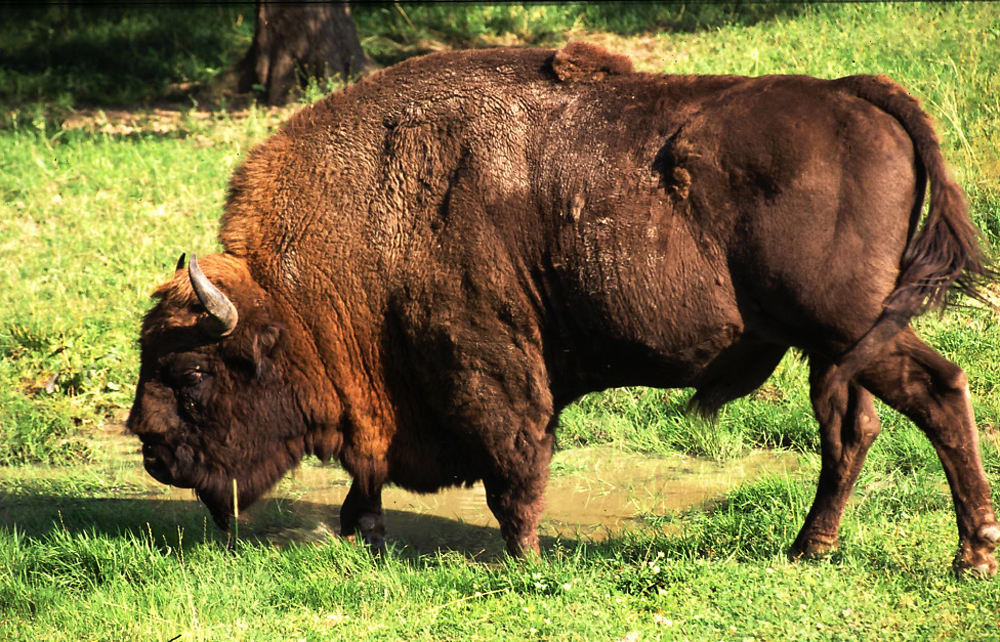
Polish wisent (żubr)

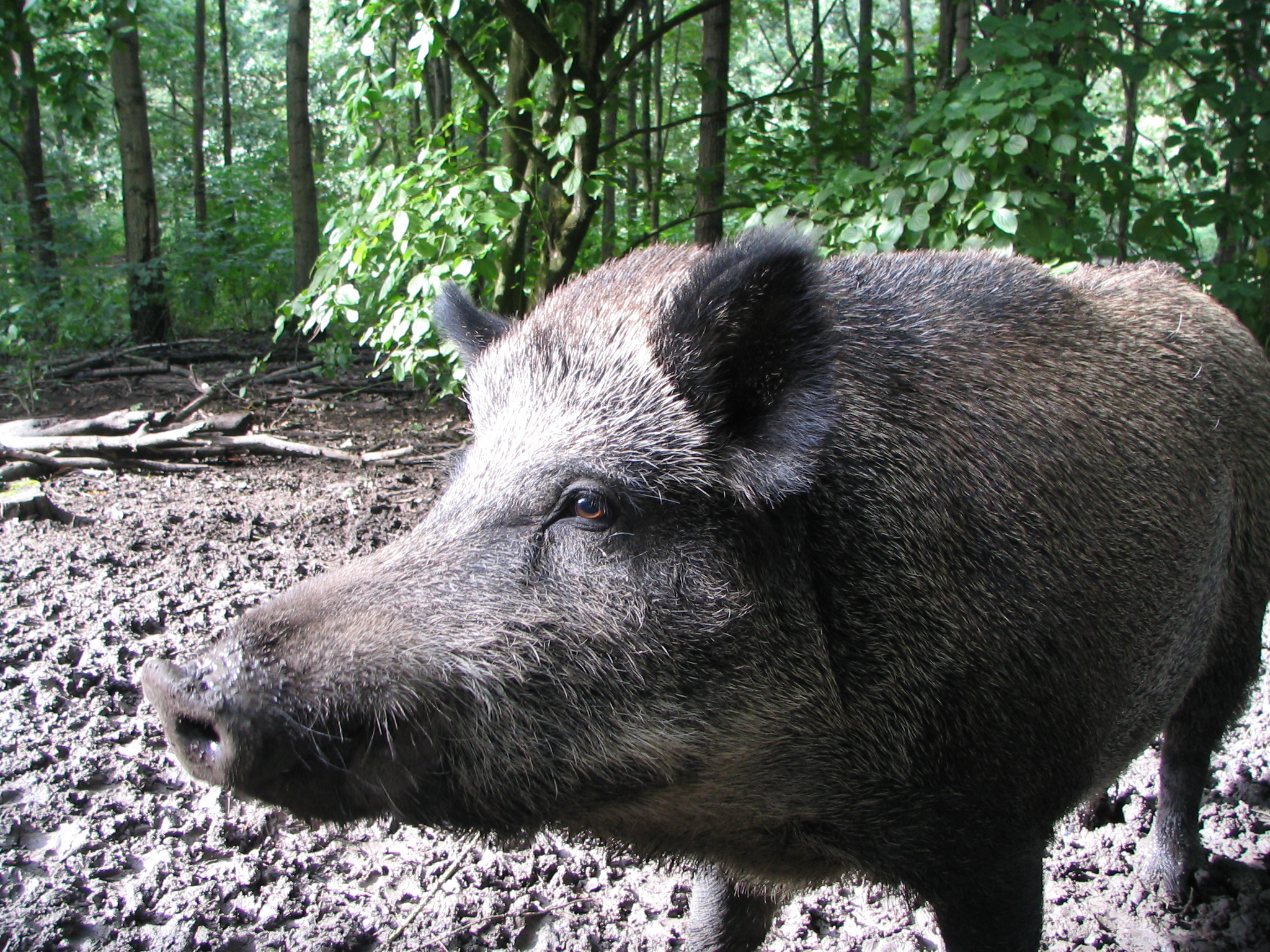
Wild boar (Polish: dzik)

Niepołomice Forest (Polish: Puszcza Niepołomicka) is a large forest complex in western part of Sandomierz Basin, about 20 km (12 mi) east of Kraków (center). It is made up of a few protected areas which used to constitute a single virgin forest originally. Niepołomice Forest occupies an area between Vistula and Raba rivers. The main complex covers about 110 km^{2} (42 sq mi). It is situated between the towns of Niepołomice, Baczków, Krzyżanowice and Mikluszowice.

The name Niepołomice derives from the Old Polish language word niepołomny which meant "impassable", or "impossible to destroy" or conquer.

== Description ==
The forest consists of six nature reserves with the total area of 94.43 hectares. The biggest reserve, called Gibiel (29.79 ha), covers the area with the most diverse flora and fauna, featuring 175 species of birds as well as European bison, deer, wild boar, wolves, lynx, and wild cats. The next reserve, called Lipówka (25.73 ha), features 200-year-old nature monuments, mainly lime trees, oaks and hornbeams. The slightly smaller Długosz Królewski Reserve, with an area of 24.14 ha (not far from the village of Stanisławice), was established for the protection of a rare flowering fern named Osmunda regalis (Polish: Długosz Królewski). The reserve called Dębina (12.66 ha) is set up for the preservation of ancient oak trees. Koło Reserve, with a smaller area of 3.49 ha, consists of lime trees and hornbeams. The reserve called Wiślisko Kobyle (6.67 ha) is devoted to water plants. In the heart of Niepołomice Forest is the most protected area inhabited by the Polish wisent (Żubr), the heaviest surviving land animal in Europe - The European Bison Breeding Centre of the Niepołomice Forest District.

== History ==
Because of its close proximity to Kraków, then the capital of Poland, Niepołomice Forest was the most popular hunting ground for the Polish royalty beginning in the 13th century. In its vicinity, King Casimir III the Great built the Royal hunting Castle, later rebuilt by Sigismund I the Old and fitted with the Queen Bona Sforza's gardens. The first official mention of the Niepołomice Forest comes from a document written in 1242, calling it "Kłaj". In 1393, the forest is mentioned as Niepołomice Woods (Las Niepołomicki), and in 1441 – for the first time, it was written about under its current name.

In 1527 Prince Albertus Jagiellon, the youngest son of Sigismund I and Bona, was born prematurely after his mother injured herself during hunting in Niepołomice Forest. The location in wilderness where accident had occurred was later called "Poszynie" (which means is Polish: Son's Ending), as young Prince did not survive. Despite this tragedy, Niepołomice Forest later became favourite hunting spot in Lesser Poland for Albertus's brother, King Sigismund II Augustus, and his wife Barbara Radziwiłł, according to the tradition, because it resembled to the Queen woodlands in her native Lithuania.

Throughout its entire history, the forest was owned by the state – by the Polish kings between 13th and 18th centuries until the military partitions of Poland, and after liberation, by the sovereign state of Poland.

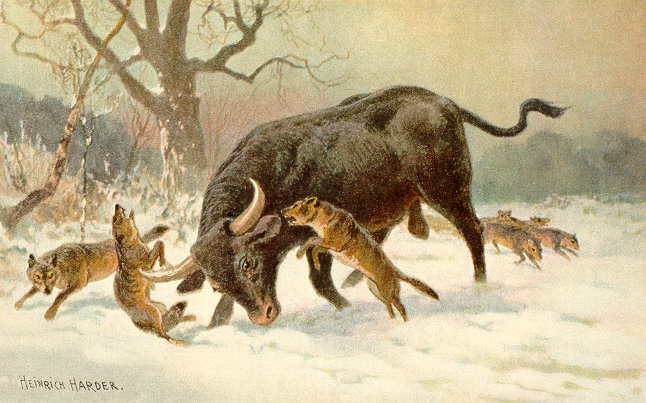
Aurochs attacked by wolves, painting by H. Harder

The early road leading through the forest was called the Royal Road (see also: the Royal Road of Kraków terminating at the Wawel Castle in the heart of the city). It was traveled by prominent Polish kings hunting for bear, the aurochs (extinct since 1627, pictured), wisent, and other big game. The forest was a source of major wood construction material. It was looked after by foresters and Masters of the Royal Hunt.

During the military partitions of Poland, from 1795 on, the Austro-Hungarian Empire (controlling the province for well over a century) destroyed most of the old-growth forest and replanted that area with fast growing pine trees meant for commerce. Even more thorough destruction of what remained of Niepołomice Forest came about during the Nazi German occupation of Poland between 1939 and 1945. The trees were cut indiscriminately and shipped to military bases and battle fronts across Europe. War crimes were being committed in the area by the Nazis, with Poles and Jews from the neighbouring towns of Bochnia and Niepołomice murdered deep in the woods. There are numerous mass graves in the forest including those of Polish soldiers from 156 Infantry Regiment of Army Kraków, killed on September 9, 1939, as well as those of local partisans who died before the end of World War II. Among the 40 hostages executed there on December 11, 1942, was the heroic President of Kraków, Dr Stanisław Klimecki.

At present, the forest is maintained according to modern forestry practices. Very old trees are generally rare. The program of reconstruction began in postwar Poland around the mid 20th century, including the reinstatement of native plants in drawn-out areas.

== Tourism ==
The forest is transversed by several walking trails including a 7 km (4.3 mi) bicycle trail and the newly open 4 km-long (2.5-mile) educational trail complete with informational placards about the local flora and fauna. Among the trails which lead deep into the forest, there is the 14 km-long (8.7-mile) Niepołomice – Poszyna (green) trail called the Royal Road, and the two trails each 12 km-long (7.5-mile), Grodkowice – Błoto – Sitowiec, and the Podłęże – Przyborów – Sitowiec (blue) trail leading to mass graves of Poles and Jews from World War II. There is also the 8 km-long (5.0-mile) Stanisławice (red) trail leading toward the perimeter of the wisent reserve; however, the reserve is not accessible to visitors. All trails are designed and maintained by the Forestry Inspectorate of Niepołomice.

== See also ==
- Forests of Poland
- Special Protection Areas in Poland
- Natura 2000 in Poland
