= Proszówki =

- Village
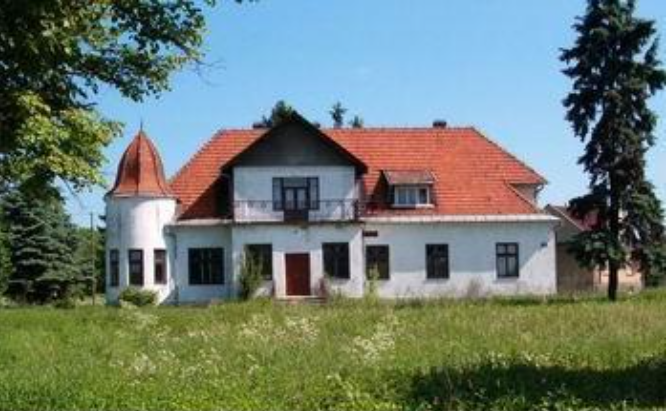
- Manor house

- Coat of arms

- Location within Poland
- Coordinates: 49°59′52″N 20°26′0″E
- Country: Poland
- Voivodeship: Lesser Poland
- County: Bochnia
- Gmina: Bochnia

Proszówki is a village in the administrative district of Gmina Bochnia, within Bochnia County, Lesser Poland Voivodeship, in southern Poland.
