= Bessów =

- Village
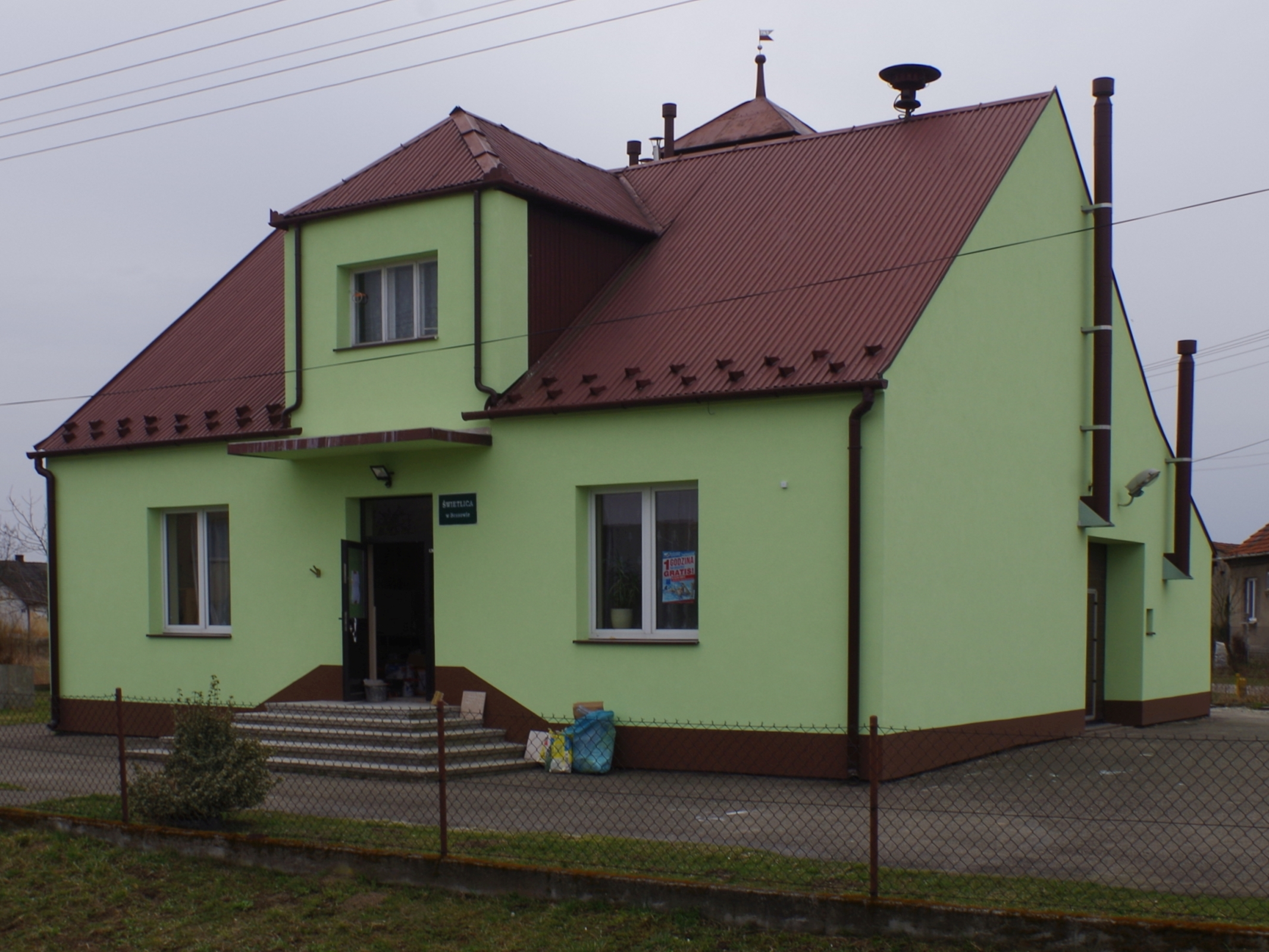

- Location within Poland
- Coordinates: 50°4′43″N 20°29′53″E
- Country: Poland
- Voivodeship: Lesser Poland
- County: Bochnia
- Gmina: Bochnia
- Population: 300

Bessów [ˈbɛssuf] is a village in the administrative district of Gmina Bochnia, within Bochnia County, Lesser Poland Voivodeship, in southern Poland.
