= Gawłów, Lesser Poland Voivodeship =

Gawłów
- Village
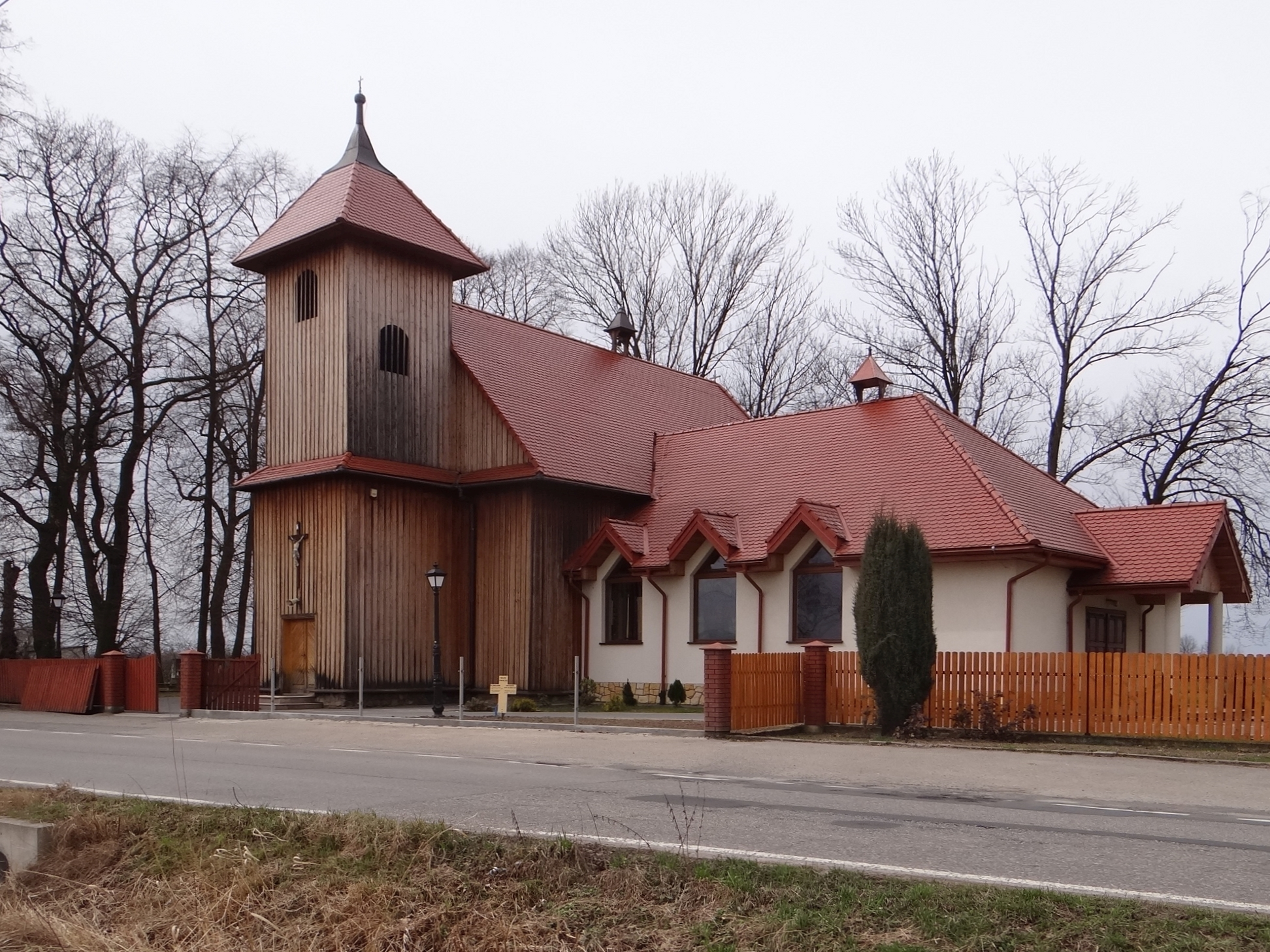
- Catholic church

- Location within Poland
- Coordinates: 50°1′N 20°27′E
- Country: Poland
- Voivodeship: Lesser Poland
- County: Bochnia
- Gmina: Bochnia

Gawłów [ˈɡavwuf] is a village in the administrative district of Gmina Bochnia, within Bochnia County, Lesser Poland Voivodeship, in southern Poland.
