= Slomka =

Slomka or Słomka may refer to:

== Places ==
- Słomka, Lesser Poland Voivodeship, village in Poland

== People ==
- Jan Słomka (1842–1932), Polish politician
- Marietta Slomka (born 1969), German journalist
- Mirko Slomka (born 1967), German football coach
- Wojciech Słomka (born 1998), Polish footballer
