= Chełm, Bochnia County =

Chełm
- Village
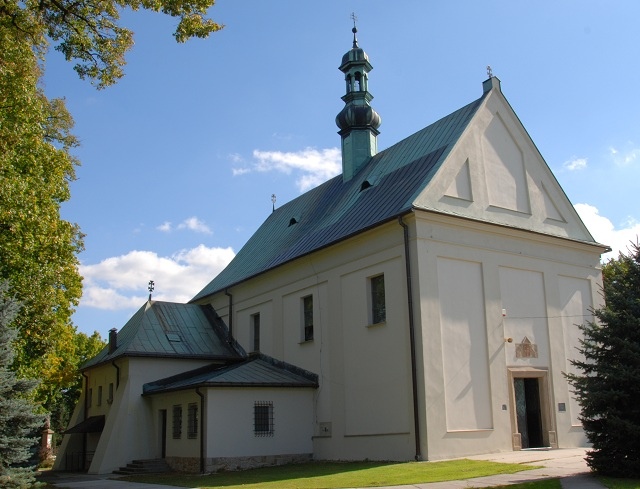
- Saint John the Baptist church in Chełm

- Coat of arms

- Location within Poland
- Coordinates: 49°58′N 20°19′E
- Country: Poland
- Voivodeship: Lesser Poland
- County: Bochnia
- Gmina: Bochnia
- Time zone: UTC+1 (CET)
  - Summer (DST): UTC+2 (CEST)
- Vehicle registration: KBC, KBA

Chełm (Polish pronunciation: [xɛwm]) is a village in the administrative district of Gmina Bochnia, within Bochnia County, Lesser Poland Voivodeship, in southern Poland.
