= Nieszkowice Wielkie =

- Village
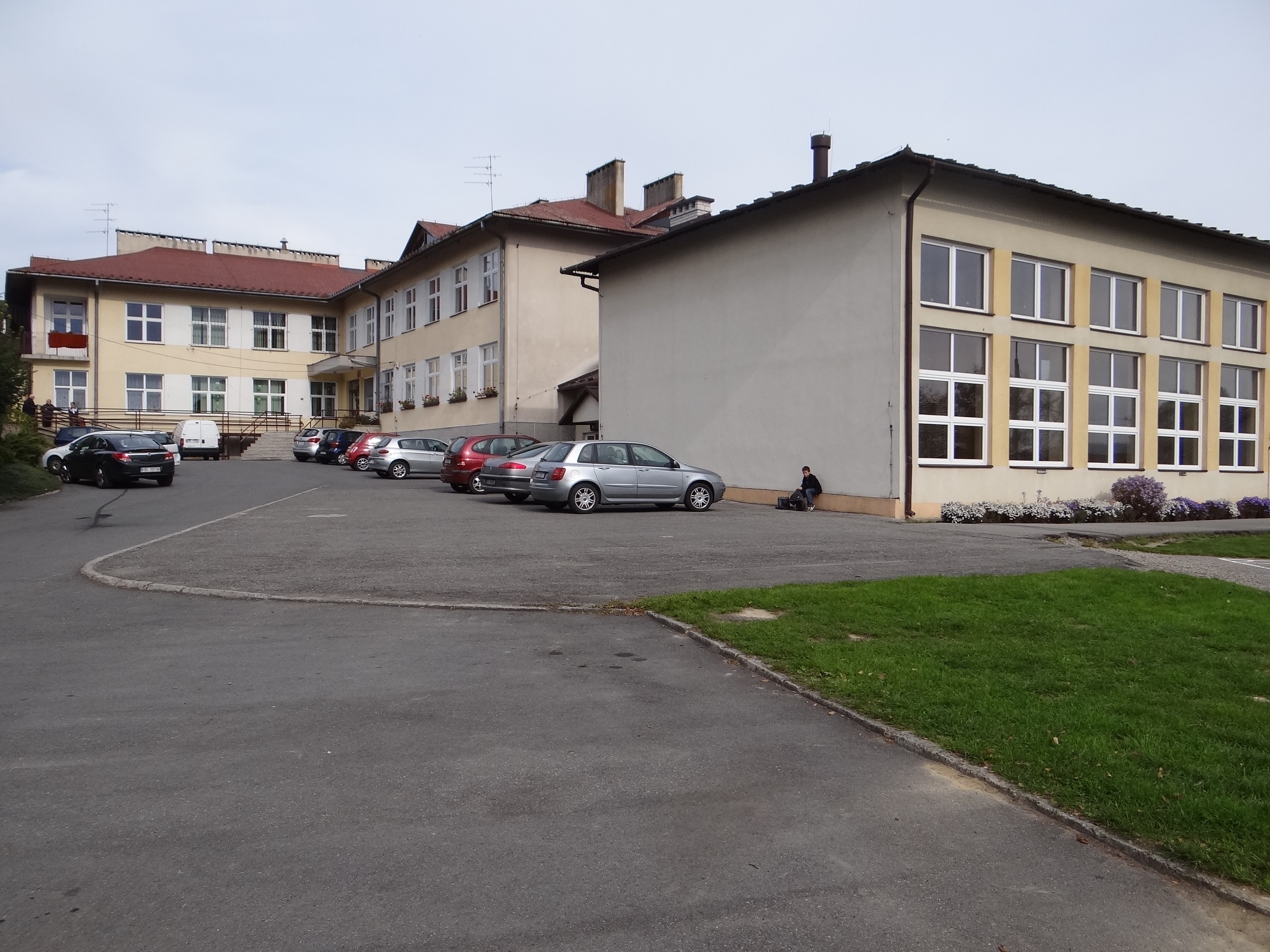
- School

- Location within Poland
- Coordinates: 49°54′N 20°24′E
- Country: Poland
- Voivodeship: Lesser Poland
- County: Bochnia
- Gmina: Bochnia

Nieszkowice Wielkie [ɲɛʂkɔˈvit͡sɛ ˈvjɛlkʲɛ] is a village in the administrative district of Gmina Bochnia, within Bochnia County, Lesser Poland Voivodeship, in southern Poland.
