= Grabina, Lesser Poland Voivodeship =

Grabina
- Village
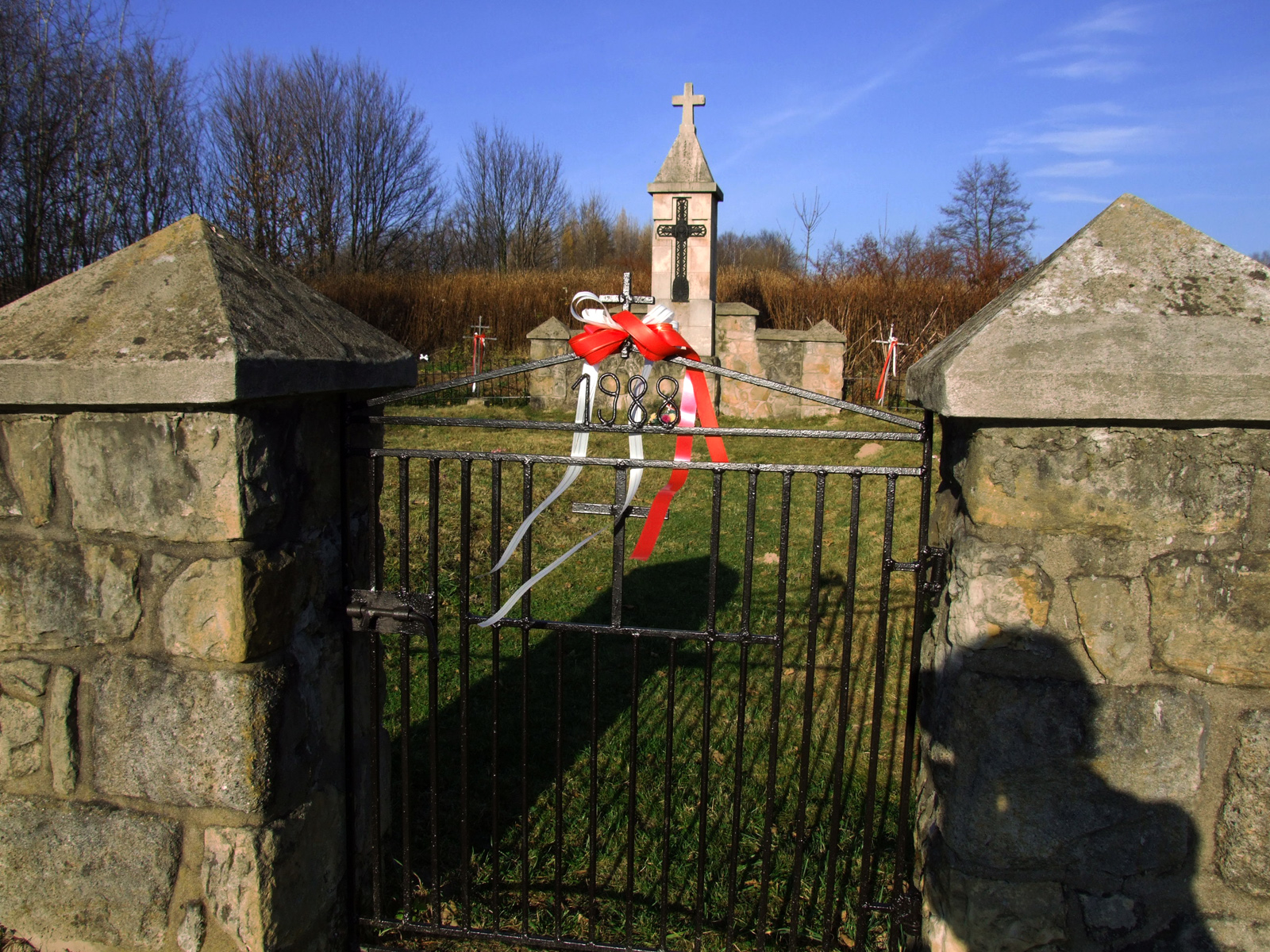
- War cemetery

- Location within Poland
- Coordinates: 49°55′30″N 20°21′25″E
- Country: Poland
- Voivodeship: Lesser Poland
- County: Bochnia
- Gmina: Bochnia

Grabina [ɡraˈbina] is a village in the administrative district of Gmina Bochnia, within Bochnia County, Lesser Poland Voivodeship, in southern Poland.
