= Wanda Adamska =

Polish politician (1944–2024)

Member of the Sejm
- In office 23 March 1980 – 31 August 1985

Personal details
- Born: 20 November 1944 Ruppendorf, Klingenberg, Gau Saxony, Germany
- Died: 5 December 2024 (aged 80) Brzeźnica, Poland
- Party: ZSL
- Occupation: Farmer

Wanda Adamska (20 November 1944 – 5 December 2024) was a Polish politician. A member of the United People's Party, she served in the Sejm from 1980 to 1985.

Adamska died in Brzeźnica on 5 December 2024, at the age of 80.
