= Szymon of Lipnica =

Polish catholic priest (c. 1437–1482)

Saint Szymon of Lipnica OFM
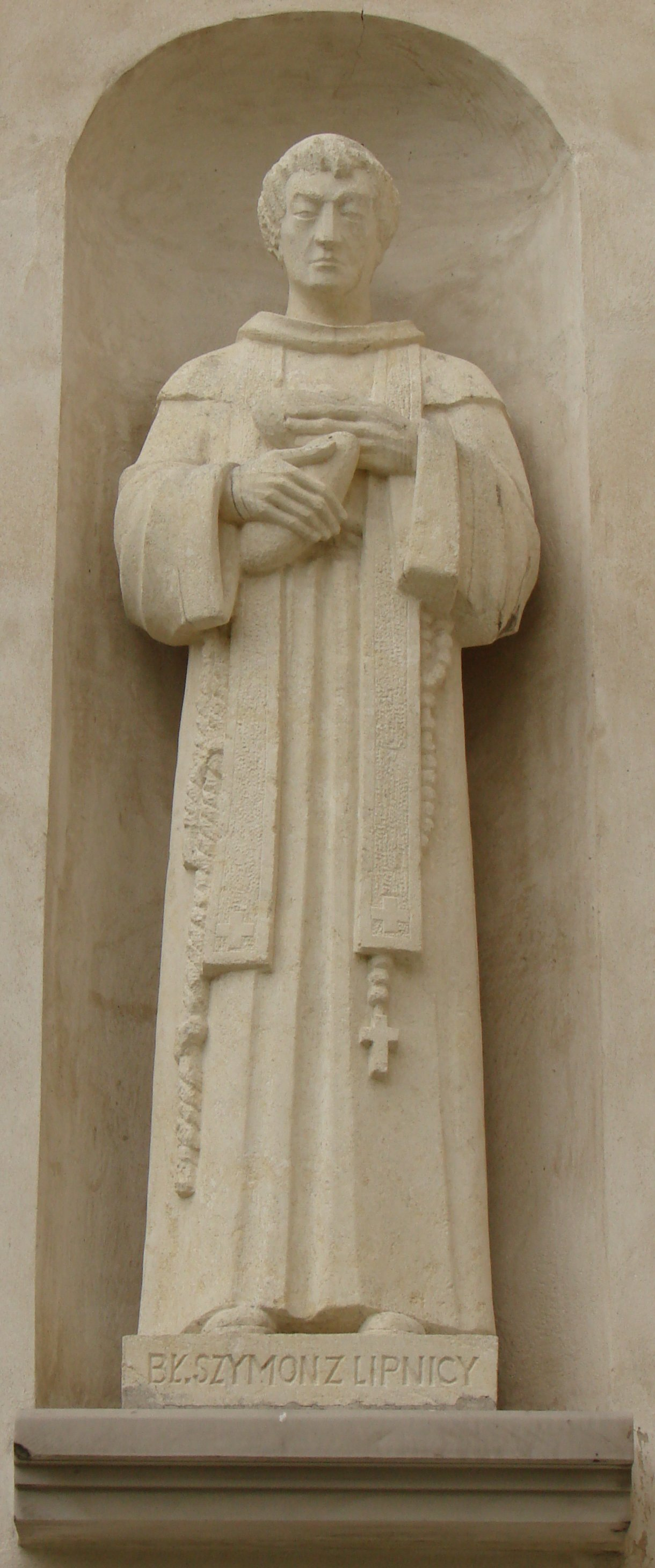
- Sculpture in Saint Joseph's Church in Muszyna.
- Born: c. 1437; Lipnica Murowana, Małopolskie, Poland
- Died: 18 July 1482 (aged 45); Kraków, Poland
- Venerated in: Roman Catholic Church
- Beatified: 24 February 1685, Saint Peter's Basilica, Papal States by Pope Innocent XI
- Canonized: 3 June 2007, Saint Peter's Square, Vatican City by Pope Benedict XVI
- Feast: 18 July

Szymon of Lipnica (c. 1437 – 18 July 1482) was a Polish catholic priest and a professed member from the Order of Friars Minor. He became a sought after and noted preacher and took as his preaching inspiration Saint Bernardine of Siena and also was a strong proponent of popular devotions that he worked to spread.

His beatification was celebrated under Pope Innocent XI in 1685 after the pontiff confirmed the local and popular "cultus" to the late Franciscan while the cause reopened centuries later; Pope Benedict XVI confirmed his heroic virtue and named him as Venerable in 2006 and canonized him as a saint mere months later on 3 June 2007 in Saint Peter's Square upon the confirmation of a 1943 miracle attributed to his intercession.

== Life ==
Szymon was born in Poland around 1437 to the poor and pious Grzegorz and Anna in the small town of Lipnica Murowana. He moved to the capital of Kraków in order to pursue his education at the Jagiellonian college in 1454 while it was around this time that a sermon that John Capistran preached led him to consider a path to the priesthood; he joined the Order of Friars Minor as a result of this. He received a bachelor's degree in 1457.

In 1457 he requested to be received into the order along with ten other fellow students at the order's convent of Saint Bernard in Stradom. The novice master Christoper of Varese oversaw his religious formation; the seminarian was later ordained as a priest around 1460. He had made his vows in 1458. The new priest was first stationed at the Franciscan convent in Tarnów and later at Stradom where he became noted as a powerful preacher and for spreading popular devotions such as the Name of Jesus; his inspiration for his preaching was Bernardine of Siena and he went to Aquila on 17 May 1472 to participate in the solemn transfer of the saint's remains. Szymon later travelled to Pavia in 1478 for the order's General Chapter and fulfilled his wish of visiting the tombs of Simon Peter and Paul the Apostle as well as going on a pilgrimage to the Holy Land.

Szymon often observed long fasts and scourged himself as a penitential practice as was wearing a penitential girdle - on feasts related to the Mother of God he would add a second girdle in order to win her special favor.

He died in mid-1482 a week after contracting the plague which he got after tending to the ill during the epidemic of the plague. He died with his gaze fixated on the Crucifix close to him.

== Sainthood ==
The beatification for the late Franciscan came to fruition under Pope Innocent XI on 20 February 1685 in which the pontiff confirmed that there existed a spontaneous and enduring local "cultus" - or popular veneration - and therefore beatified him. The cause then remained inactive for several centuries despite best efforts to reopen it until Pope Pius XII requested its reopening in a decree for the cause's resumption on 25 June 1948. It remained further inactive for several decades afterwards until a diocesan process was opened in 2000 and concluded in a special Mass on 19 September 2000 that Cardinal Franciszek Macharski presided over. The Congregation for the Causes of Saints later validated this process on 25 October 2002 and received the official Positio in 2003 for assessment.

The historians met to discuss the cause and approved it on 2 March 2004 as did the board of theologians on 12 October 2004 and the cardinal and bishop members of the C.C.S. on 11 January 2005. The late Franciscan's life of heroic virtue received the confirmation of Pope Benedict XVI on 19 December 2005 who declared him to be Venerable.

The process for the investigation of the miracle needed for him to be sainted was investigated - the 1943 cure of a woman - and received the validation of the C.C.S. on 7 November 2003 before receiving that of the medical board on 14 April 2005. Theologians also assented to this verdict on 21 February 2006 as did the C.C.S. on 3 October 2006. Benedict XVI issued final confirmation for this miracle and canonized Szymon as a saint of the Roman Catholic Church in Saint Peter's Square on 3 June 2007 after confirming the date at a papal consistory on 23 February 2007.
