= Buczyna, Lesser Poland Voivodeship =

Buczyna
- Village
- Location within Poland
- Coordinates: 49°55′N 20°20′E
- Country: Poland
- Voivodeship: Lesser Poland
- County: Bochnia
- Gmina: Bochnia
- Website: https://web.archive.org/web/20080916065457/http://www.buczyna.ovh.org/

Buczyna [buˈt͡ʂɨna] is a village in the administrative district of Gmina Bochnia, within Bochnia County, Lesser Poland Voivodeship, in southern Poland.
