= Majkowice, Bochnia County =

Majkowice
- Village
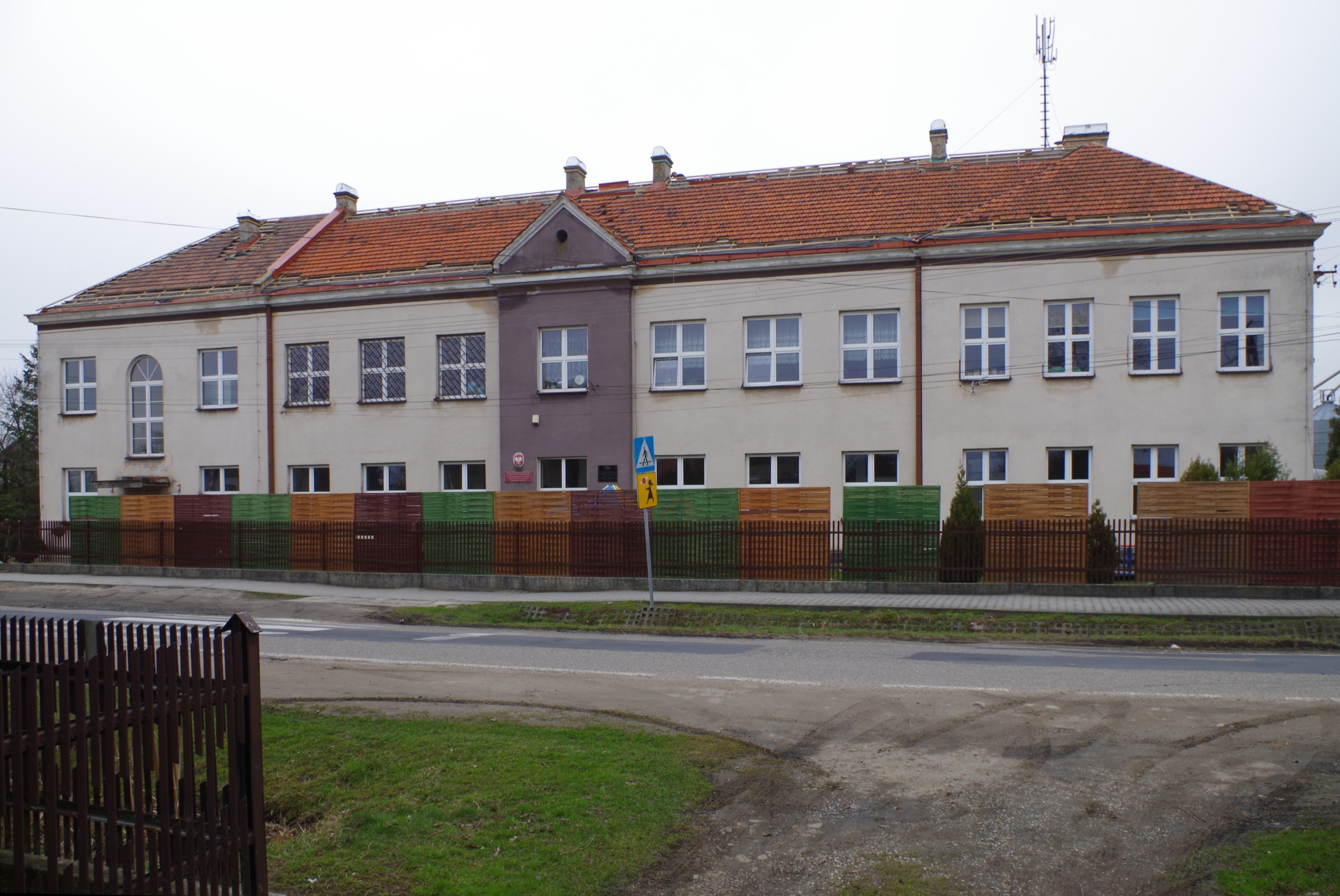
- School

- Location within Poland
- Coordinates: 50°2′N 20°28′E
- Country: Poland
- Voivodeship: Lesser Poland
- County: Bochnia
- Gmina: Bochnia

Majkowice [mai̯kɔˈvit͡sɛ] is a village in the administrative district of Gmina Bochnia, within Bochnia County, Lesser Poland Voivodeship, in southern Poland.
