= Nieprześnia =

- Village
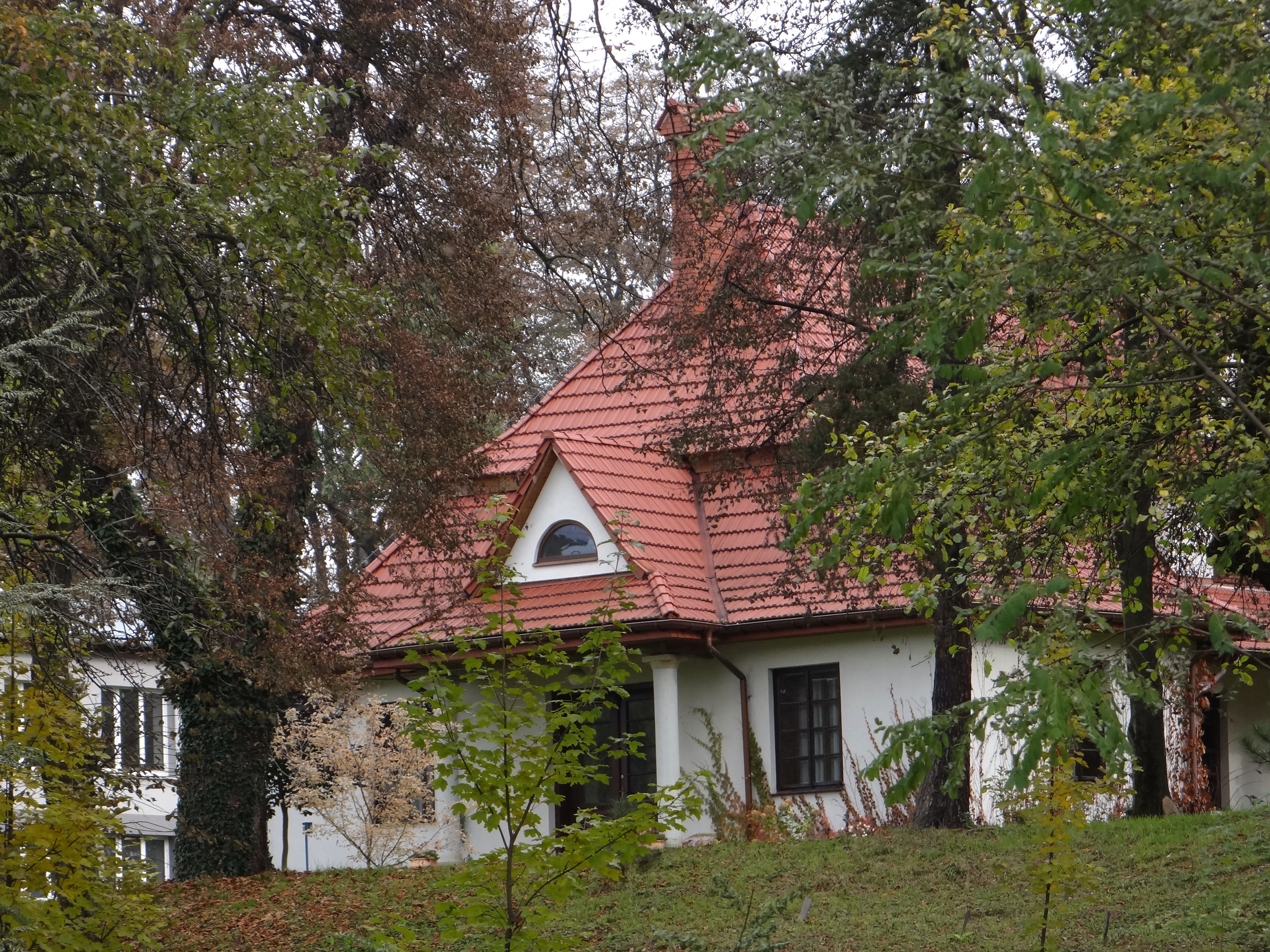
- Former manor house in Nieprześnia

- Location within Poland
- Coordinates: 49°55′N 20°22′E
- Country: Poland
- Voivodeship: Lesser Poland
- County: Bochnia
- Gmina: Bochnia

Nieprześnia [ɲɛˈpʂɛɕɲa] is a village in the administrative district of Gmina Bochnia, within Bochnia County, Lesser Poland Voivodeship, in southern Poland.
