= Cerekiew =

Cerekiew may refer to the following places in Poland:

- Cerekiew, Lesser Poland Voivodeship (southern Poland)
- Cerekiew, Masovian Voivodeship (east-central Poland)
