= Damienice =

- Village
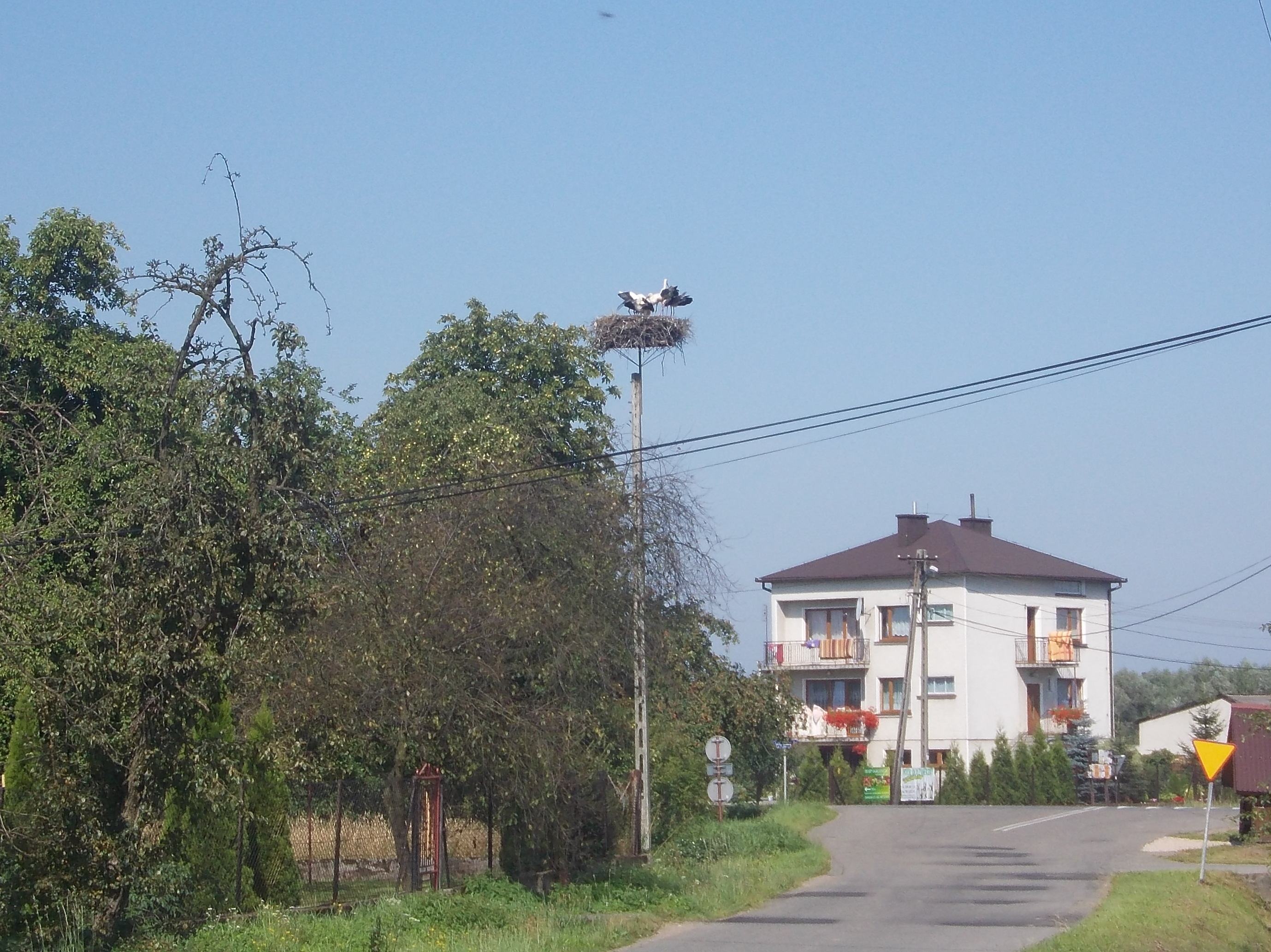

- Location within Poland
- Coordinates: 49°59′N 20°24′E
- Country: Poland
- Voivodeship: Lesser Poland
- County: Bochnia
- Gmina: Bochnia

Damienice [damjɛˈnit͡sɛ] is a village in the administrative district of Gmina Bochnia, within Bochnia County, Lesser Poland Voivodeship, in southern Poland.
