= Gorzków =

Gorzków may refer to the following places:

- Gorzków, Bochnia County in Lesser Poland Voivodeship (south Poland)
- Gorzków, Wieliczka County in Lesser Poland Voivodeship (south Poland)
- Gorzków, Krasnystaw County in Lublin Voivodeship (east Poland)
- Gorzków, Kazimierza County in Świętokrzyskie Voivodeship (south-central Poland)
- Gorzków, Staszów County in Świętokrzyskie Voivodeship (south-central Poland)
