= Nieszkowice Małe =

- Village
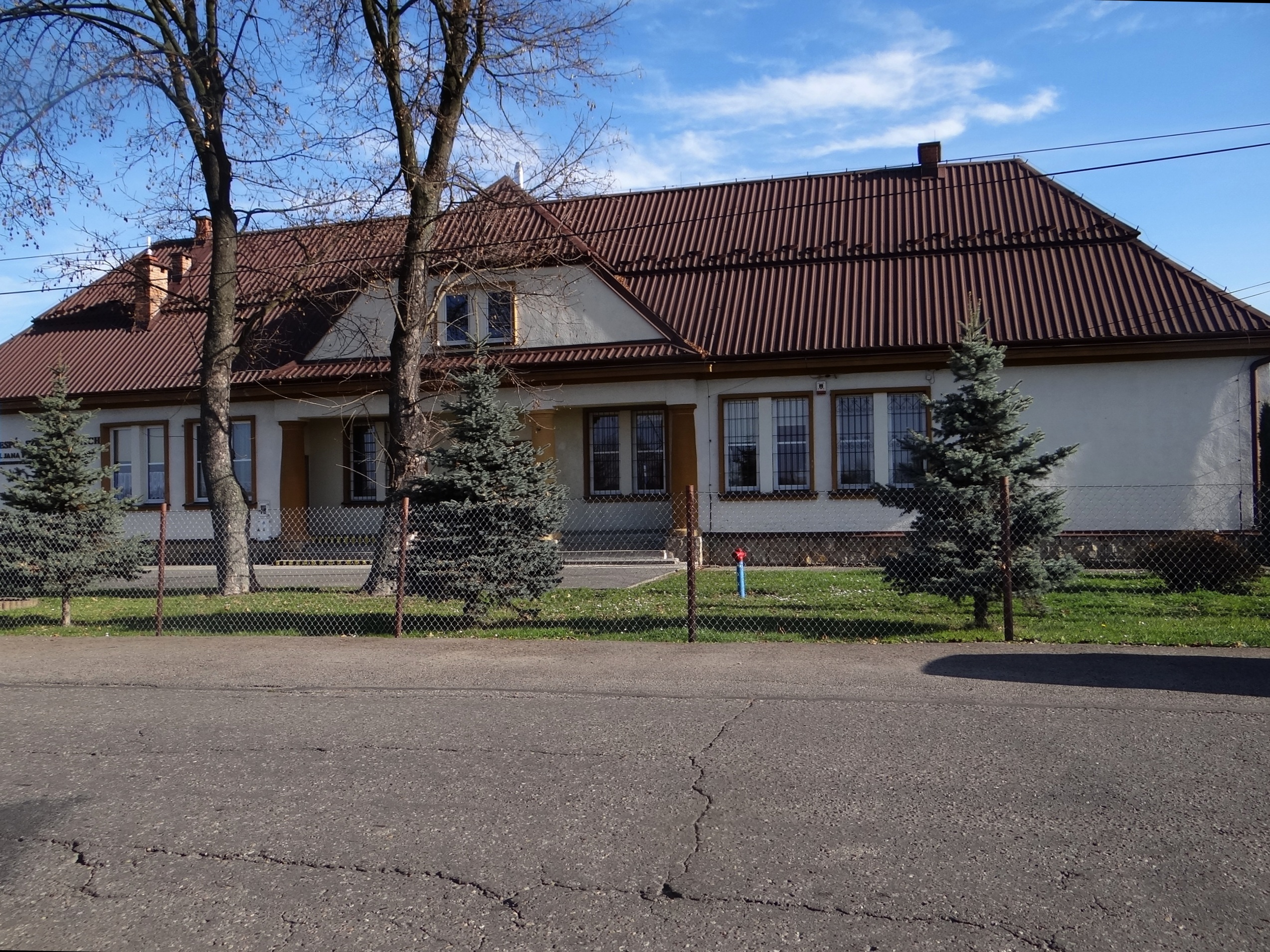
- School (formerly manor house)

- Location within Poland
- Coordinates: 49°56′N 20°19′E
- Country: Poland
- Voivodeship: Lesser Poland
- County: Bochnia
- Gmina: Bochnia
- Population: 420

Nieszkowice Małe [ɲɛʂkɔˈvit͡sɛ ˈmawɛ] is a village in the administrative district of Gmina Bochnia, within Bochnia County, Lesser Poland Voivodeship, in southern Poland.
