= Dąbrowica, Bochnia County =

Dąbrowica
- Village
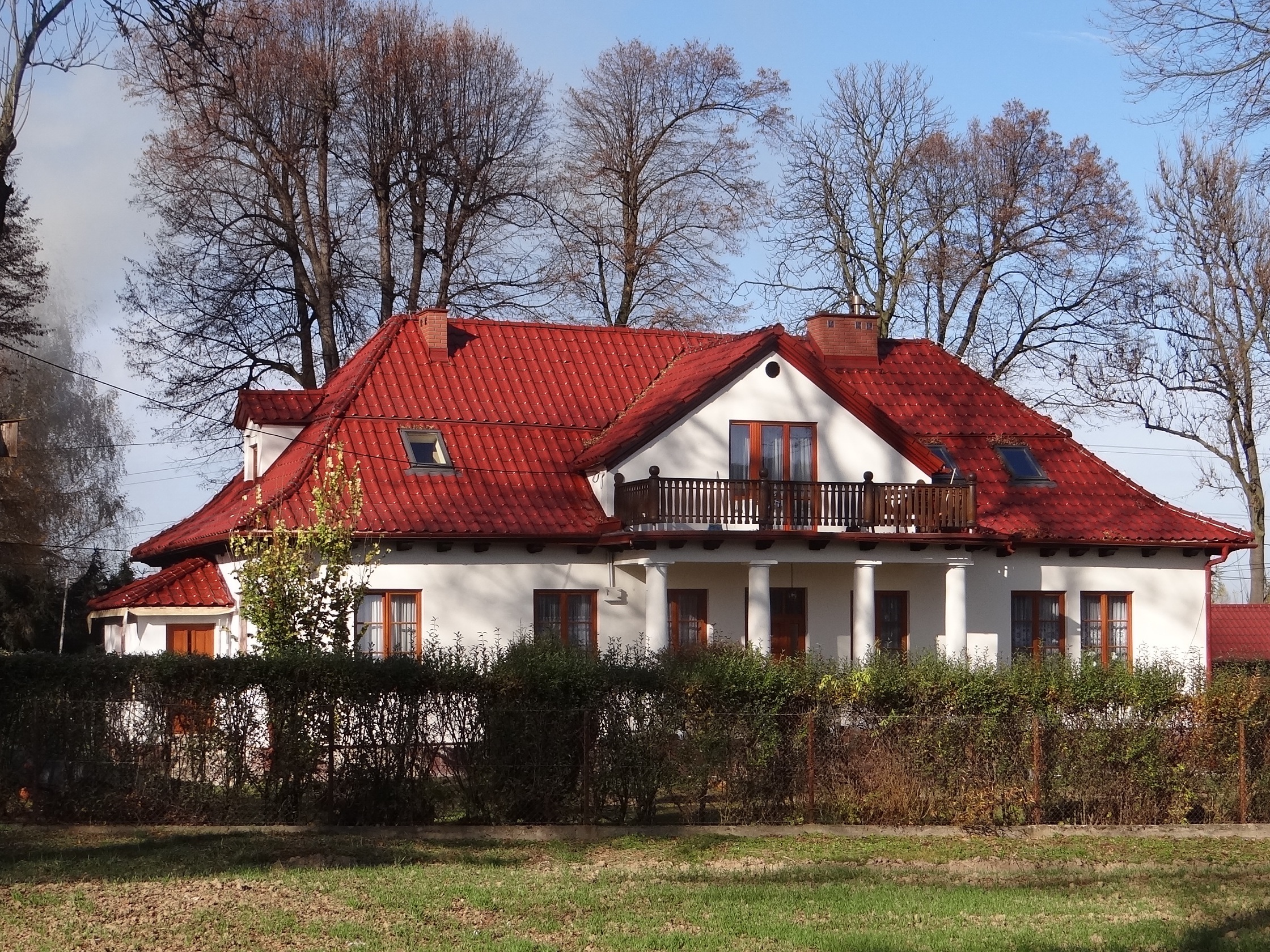
- Former manor house in Dąbrowica

- Location within Poland
- Coordinates: 49°56′02″N 20°21′50″E
- Country: Poland
- Voivodeship: Lesser Poland
- County: Bochnia
- Gmina: Bochnia

Dąbrowica [dɔmbrɔˈvit͡sa] is a village in the administrative district of Gmina Bochnia, within Bochnia County, Lesser Poland Voivodeship, in southern Poland.
