= Cikowice =

- Village
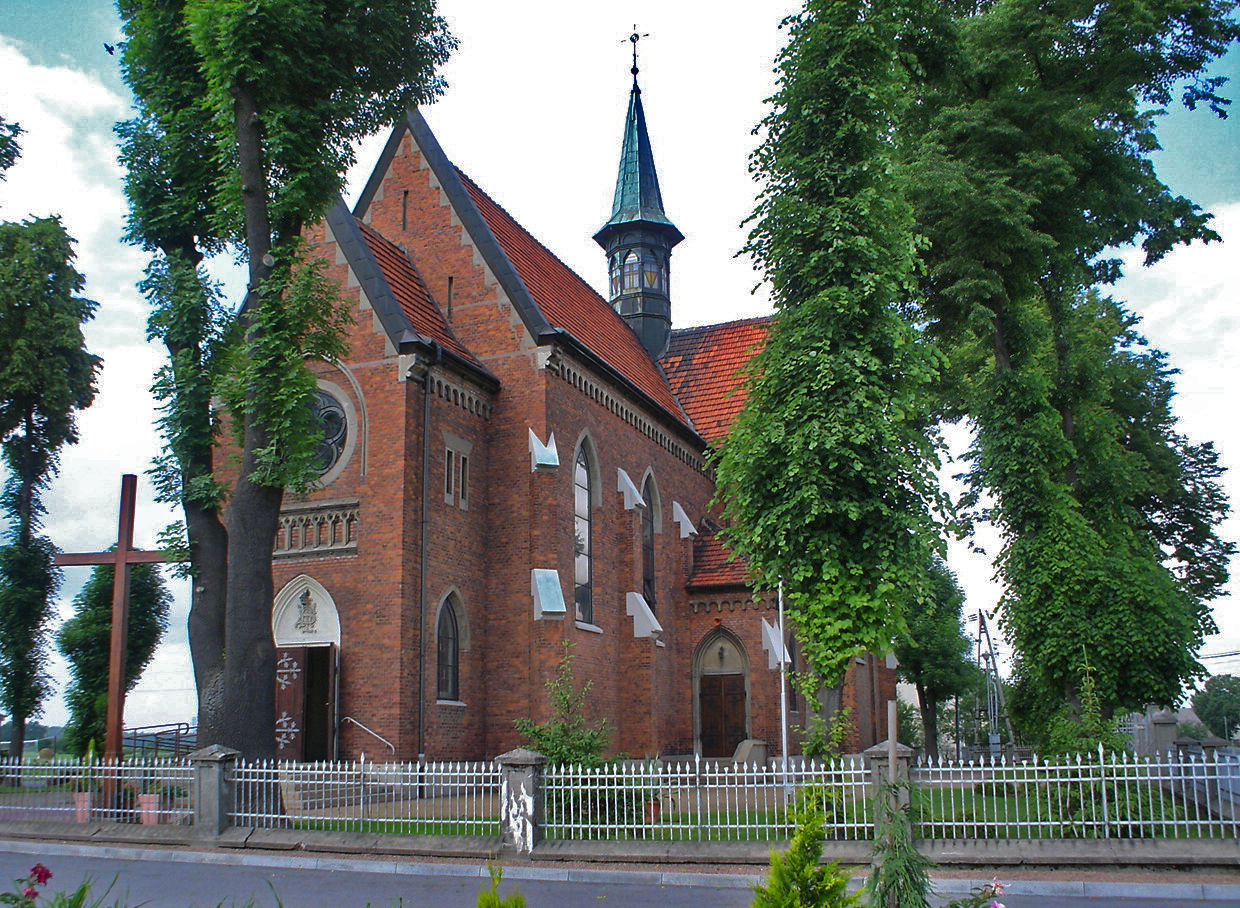
- Saint Anthony of Padua church in Cikowice

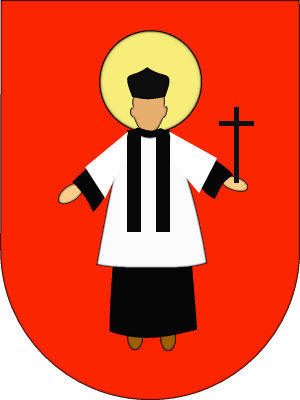
- Coat of arms

- Location within Poland
- Coordinates: 49°59′N 20°22′E
- Country: Poland
- Voivodeship: Lesser Poland
- County: Bochnia
- Gmina: Bochnia

Cikowice [t͡ɕikɔˈvit͡sɛ] is a village in the administrative district of Gmina Bochnia, within Bochnia County, Lesser Poland Voivodeship, in southern Poland.
