= Zawada, Bochnia County =

Zawada
- Village
- Location within Poland
- Coordinates: 49°54′50″N 20°23′55″E
- Country: Poland
- Voivodeship: Lesser Poland
- County: Bochnia
- Gmina: Bochnia

Zawada [zaˈvada] is a village in the administrative district of Gmina Bochnia, within Bochnia County, Lesser Poland Voivodeship, in southern Poland.
