= Łapczyca =

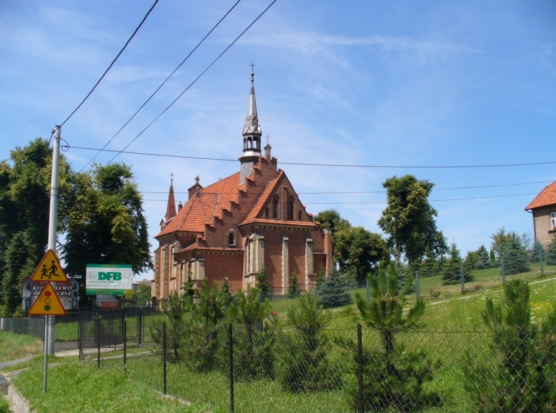
- Church in Łapczyca

- Location within Poland
- Coordinates: 49°58′N 20°22′E
- Country: Poland
- Voivodeship: Lesser Poland
- County: Bochnia
- Gmina: Bochnia
- Time zone: UTC+1 (CET)
  - Summer (DST): UTC+2 (CEST)
- Postal code: 32-744
- Area code: +48 14
- Car plates: KBC

Łapczyca [wapˈt͡ʂɨt͡sa] is a village in southern Poland, situated in Lesser Poland Voivodeship (since 1999), previously in Tarnów Voivodeship (1975-1998).
