= Gierczyce, Lesser Poland Voivodeship =

Gierczyce
- Village
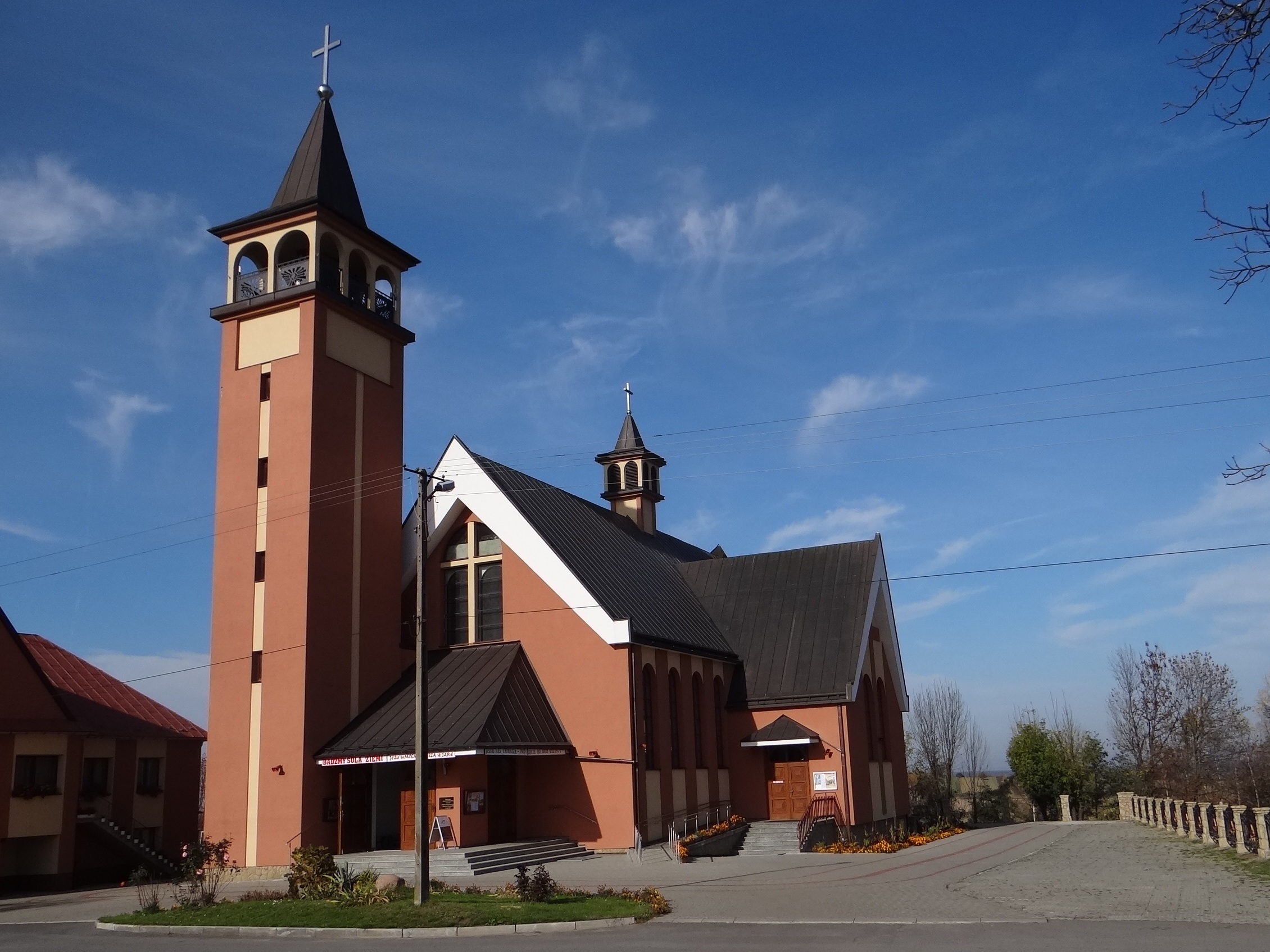
- Local Catholic church

- Location within Poland
- Coordinates: 49°58′N 20°21′E
- Country: Poland
- Voivodeship: Lesser Poland
- County: Bochnia
- Gmina: Bochnia
- Website: http://www.bochnia-gmina.pl/gierczyce.htm

Gierczyce [ɡʲɛrˈt͡ʂɨt͡sɛ] is a village in the administrative district of Gmina Bochnia, within Bochnia County, Lesser Poland Voivodeship, in southern Poland.
