= Siedlec, Bochnia County =

Siedlec
- Village
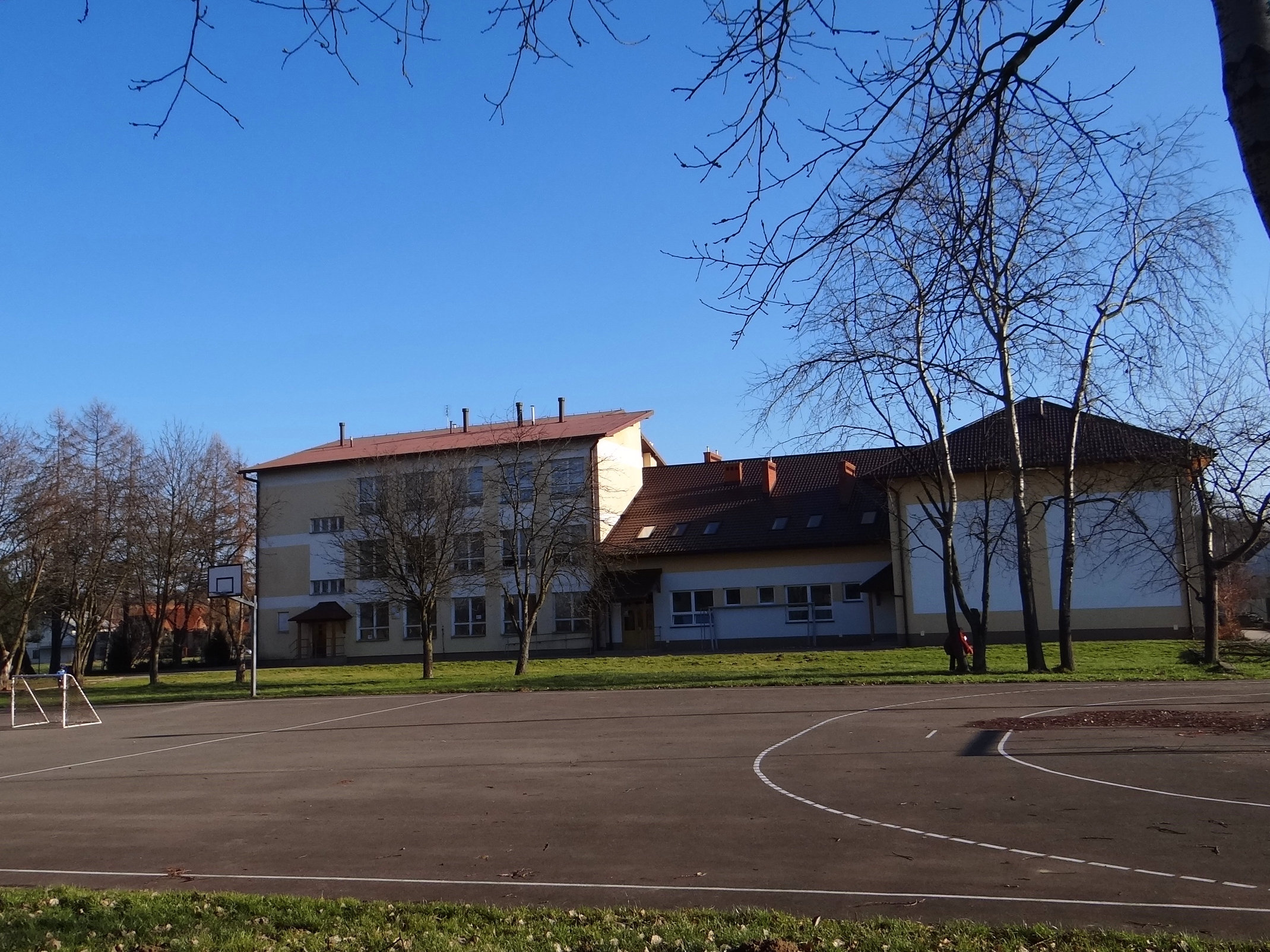
- School

- Location within Poland
- Coordinates: 49°57′N 20°19′E
- Country: Poland
- Voivodeship: Lesser Poland
- County: Bochnia
- Gmina: Bochnia

Siedlec [ˈɕɛdlɛt͡s] is a village in the administrative district of Gmina Bochnia, within Bochnia County, Lesser Poland Voivodeship, in southern Poland.
