= Zatoka =

Zatoka is the Polish and Ukrainian word for bay. It may refer to:

- Zatoka, Lesser Poland Voivodeship, in Poland
- Zatoka, Odesa Oblast, in Ukraine
- Zatoka Leśna, in northern Poland
