= Ostrów Szlachecki =

- Village
- Location within Poland
- Coordinates: 50°1′N 20°29′E
- Country: Poland
- Voivodeship: Lesser Poland
- County: Bochnia
- Gmina: Bochnia

Ostrów Szlachecki (Polish pronunciation: [ˈɔstruf ʂlaˈxɛtskʲi]) is a village in the administrative district of Gmina Bochnia, within Bochnia County, Lesser Poland Voivodeship, in southern Poland.
