= Bogucice, Bochnia County =

Bogucice
- Village
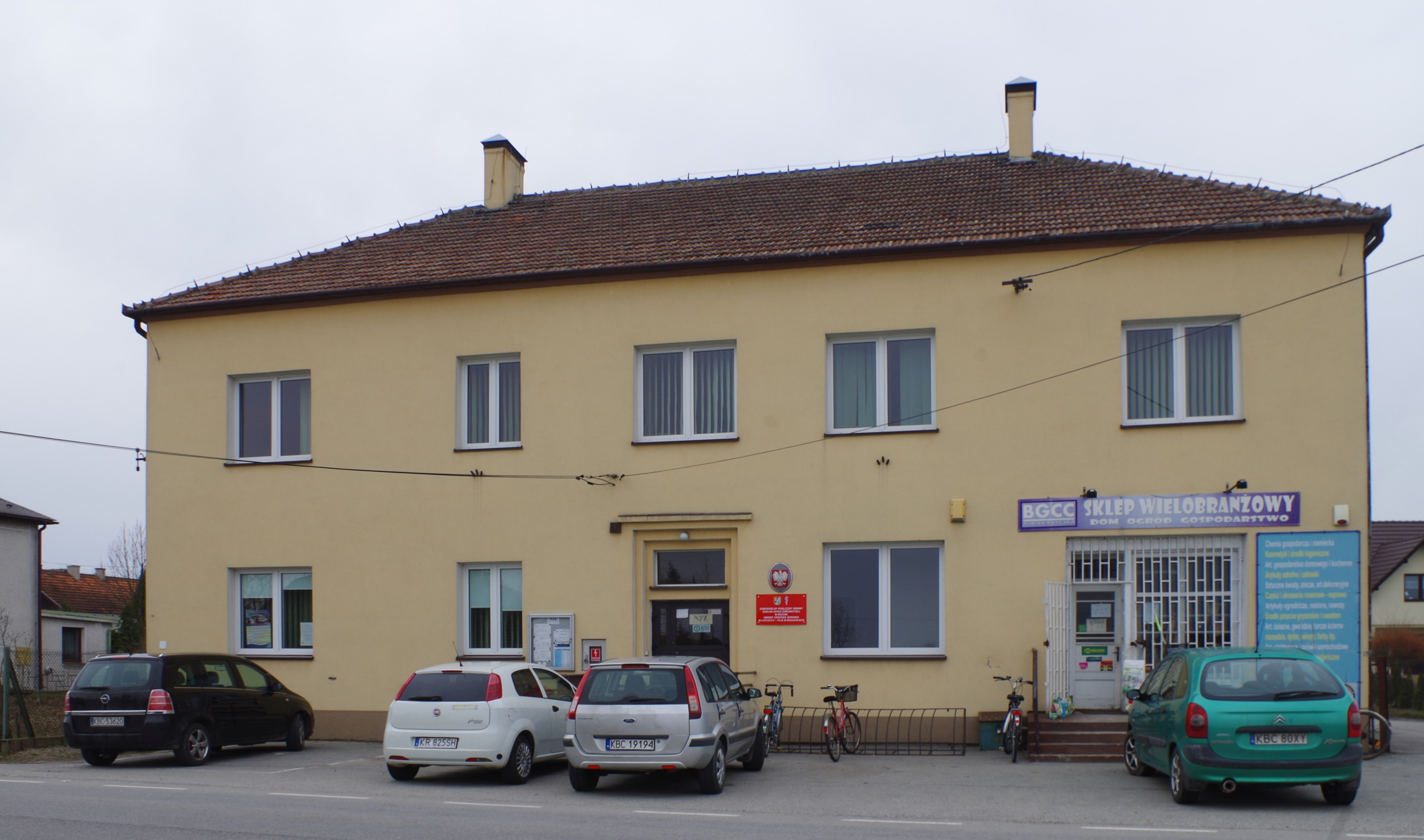

- Location within Poland
- Coordinates: 50°3′N 20°29′E
- Country: Poland
- Voivodeship: Lesser Poland
- County: Bochnia
- Gmina: Bochnia

Bogucice [bɔɡuˈt͡ɕit͡sɛ] is a village in the administrative district of Gmina Bochnia, within Bochnia County, Lesser Poland Voivodeship, in southern Poland.
