= Krzyżanowice, Lesser Poland Voivodeship =

Krzyżanowice
- Village
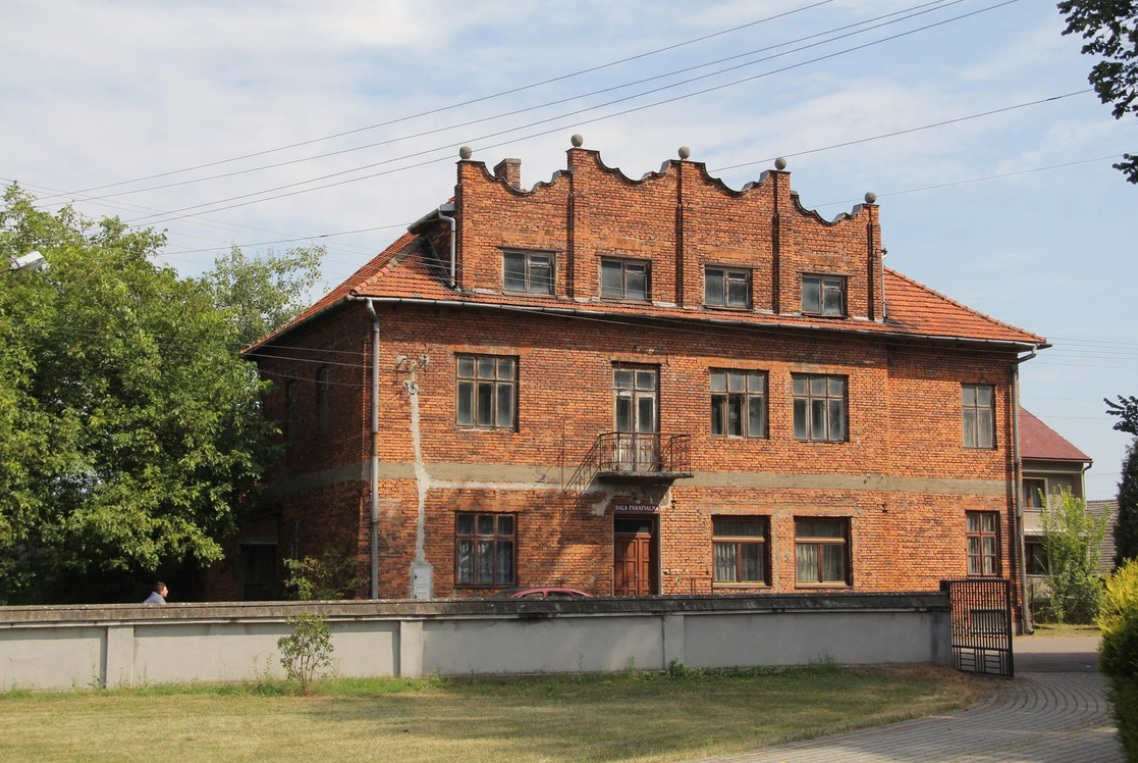
- Former "People's Catholic University"

- Location within Poland
- Coordinates: 50°0′N 20°26′E
- Country: Poland
- Voivodeship: Lesser Poland
- County: Bochnia
- Gmina: Bochnia

Krzyżanowice [kʂɨʐanɔˈvit͡sɛ] is a village in the administrative district of Gmina Bochnia, within Bochnia County, Lesser Poland Voivodeship, in southern Poland.
