= European Bison Breeding Centre of the Niepołomice Forest District =

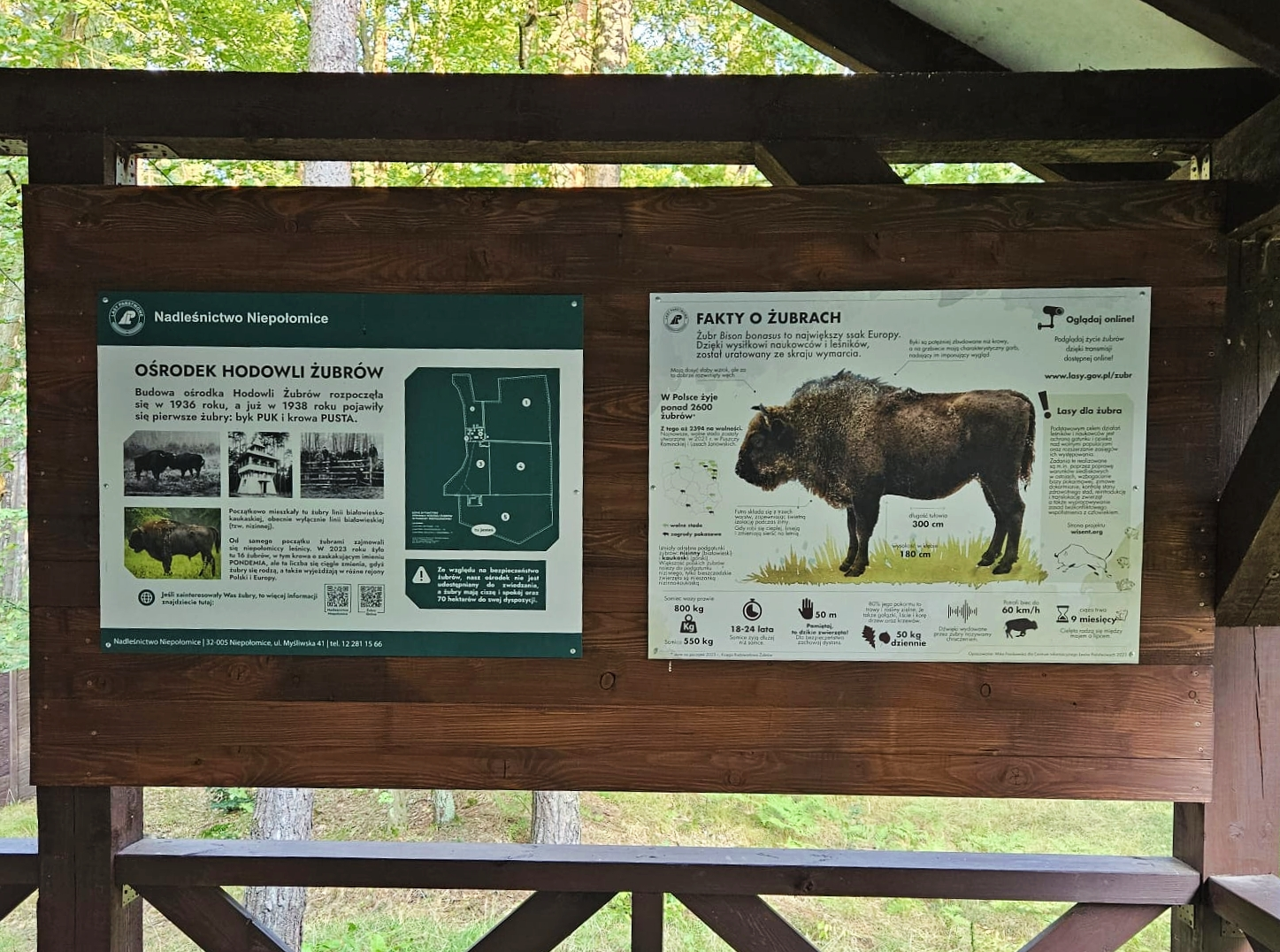
Information board

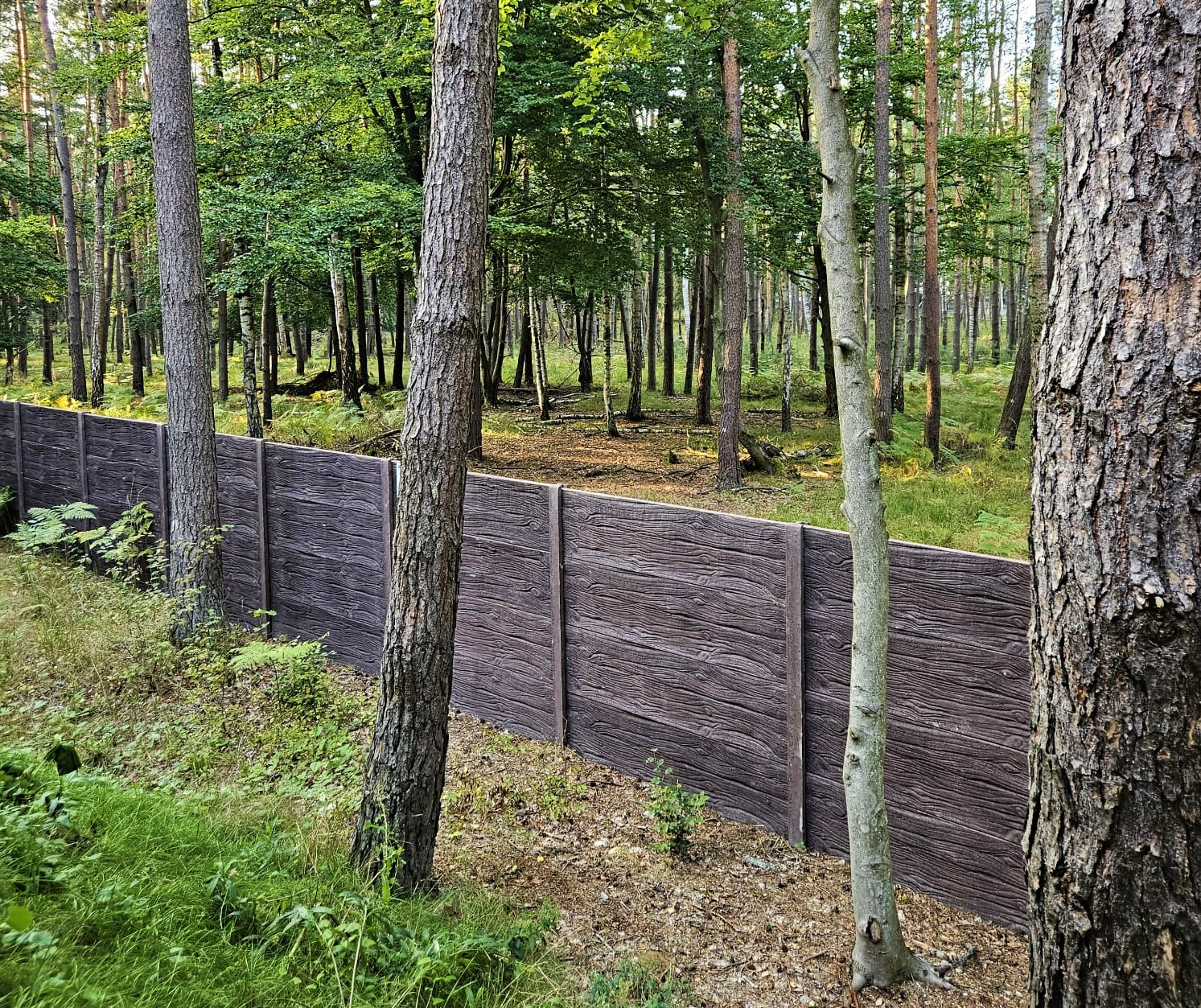
Concrete fence of the breeding center

The European Bison Breeding Centre of the Niepołomice Forest District (Polish: Ośrodek Hodowli Żubrów Nadleśnictwa Niepołomice) is a conservation breeding center for wisent run by the Niepołomice Forest District, located in the Niepołomice Forest, which operates as part of the "Comprehensive protection of the wisent by the State Forests” project.

The center is located on the area belonging to the village of Kłaj. The centre covers an area of 70 hectares (around 173 acres) and is divided into seven areas – five living sectors (with feeders, watering holes and feeding stations), a utility sector and an isolation/catching area. Most of the centre is covered by a dense forest, mainly pine, with an admixture of English oak. The breeding area is surrounded by a high concrete fence 3.5 kilometres long. The population of wisent in the breeding centre has remained at around 16 individuals in recent years, and their optimal number due to the nature and size of the centre is 25 individuals. In 1999, the centre was home to a record number of 36 wisents.

Initially, the breeding centre housed wisents of the Białowieża-Caucasus line (until 1976 only from this line), but over time only wisents from the Białowieża line remained. By September 1, 2024, a total of 279 young wisents were born in the centre.

The Niepołomice wisents gave rise to the herd in the Bieszczady Mountains, in Supraśl or the Gdańsk zoo. They also found their way to all wisent breeding farms in Poland and abroad, to the following countries: Russia, Germany, the Czech Republic, Sweden, England, Bulgaria, Finland, Denmark, Slovakia, Austria, France, Lithuania, Spain, Switzerland and Canada.
