= Pogwizdów, Bochnia County =

Pogwizdów
- Village
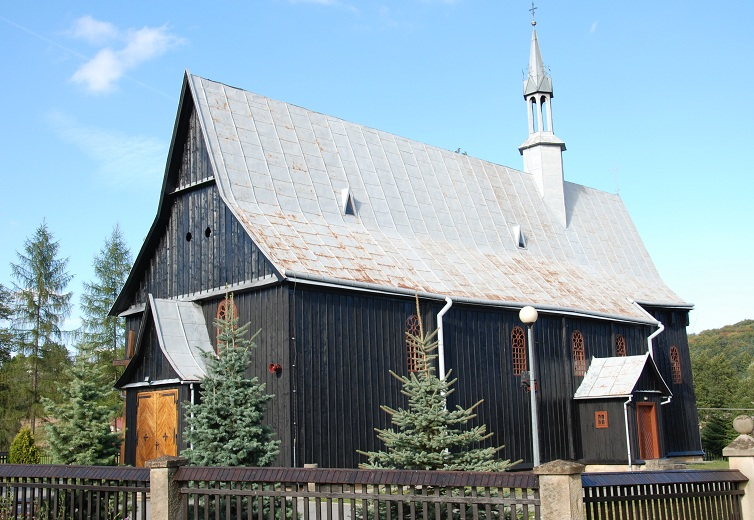
- Saints Simon and Jude church in Pogwizdów

- Location within Poland
- Coordinates: 49°56′N 20°24′E
- Country: Poland
- Voivodeship: Lesser Poland
- County: Bochnia
- Gmina: Bochnia

Pogwizdów [pɔɡˈvizduf] is a village in the administrative district of Gmina Bochnia, within Bochnia County, Lesser Poland Voivodeship, in southern Poland.
