= Słomka, Lesser Poland Voivodeship =

Słomka
- Village
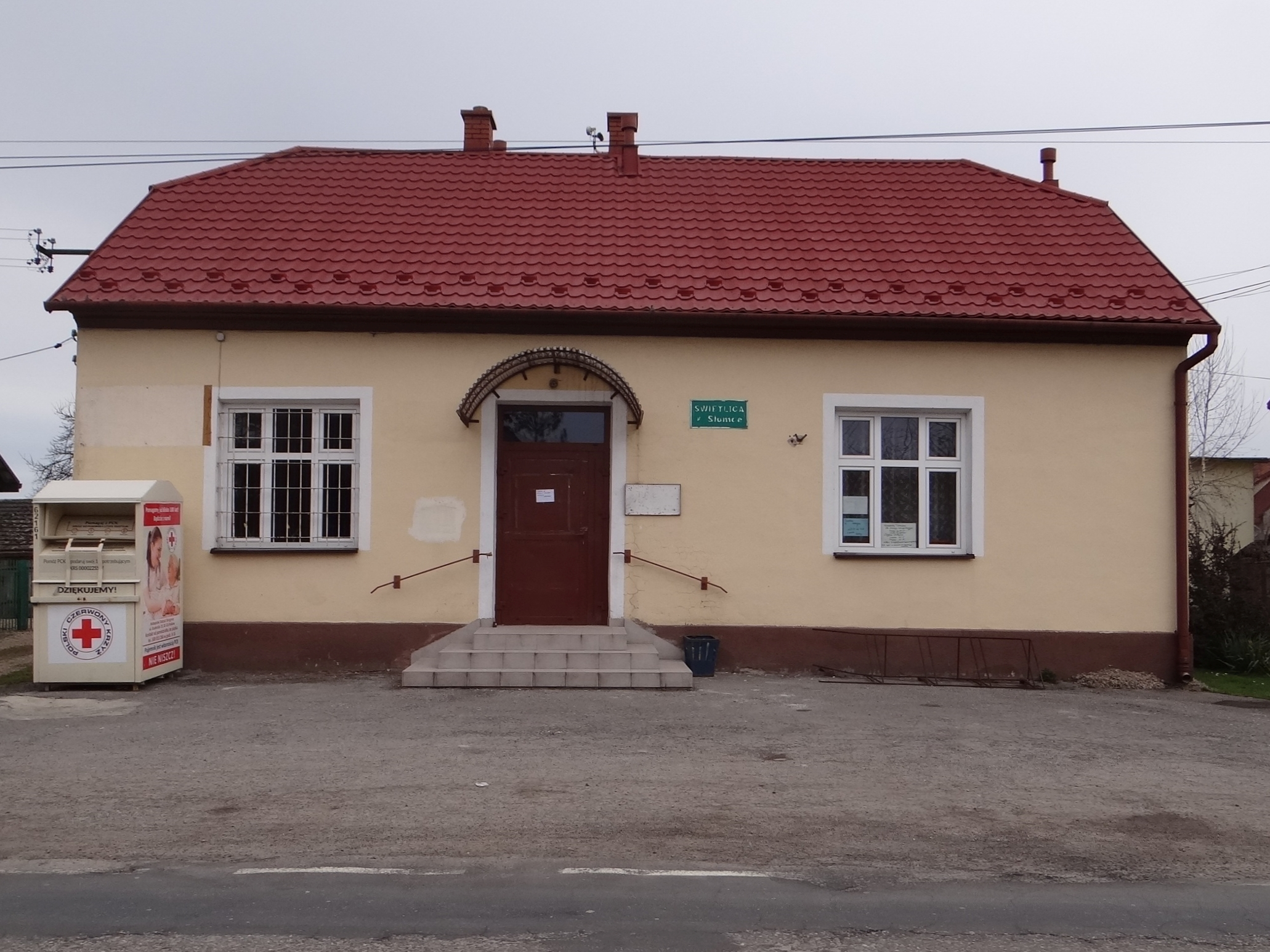

- Location within Poland
- Coordinates: 50°1′N 20°27′E
- Country: Poland
- Voivodeship: Lesser Poland
- County: Bochnia
- Gmina: Bochnia

Słomka [ˈswɔmka] is a village in the administrative district of Gmina Bochnia, within Bochnia County, Lesser Poland Voivodeship, in southern Poland.
