= Brzeźnica, Bochnia County =

Brzeźnica
- Village
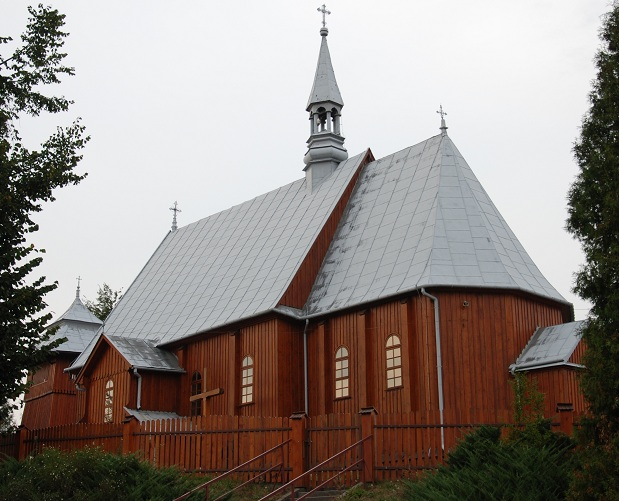
- Saint Stanislaus Catholic church

- Location within Poland
- Coordinates: 49°57′N 20°28′E
- Country: Poland
- Voivodeship: Lesser Poland
- County: Bochnia
- Gmina: Bochnia
- Population: 1,100

Brzeźnica [bʐɛʑˈnit͡sa] is a village in the administrative district of Gmina Bochnia, within Bochnia County, Lesser Poland Voivodeship, in southern Poland. The village is approximately 5 kilometres (3 mi) south-east of Bochnia and 40 km (25 mi) east of the regional capital Kraków.
