= Gmina Bochnia =

Gmina Bochnia Bochnia Commune
- Gmina
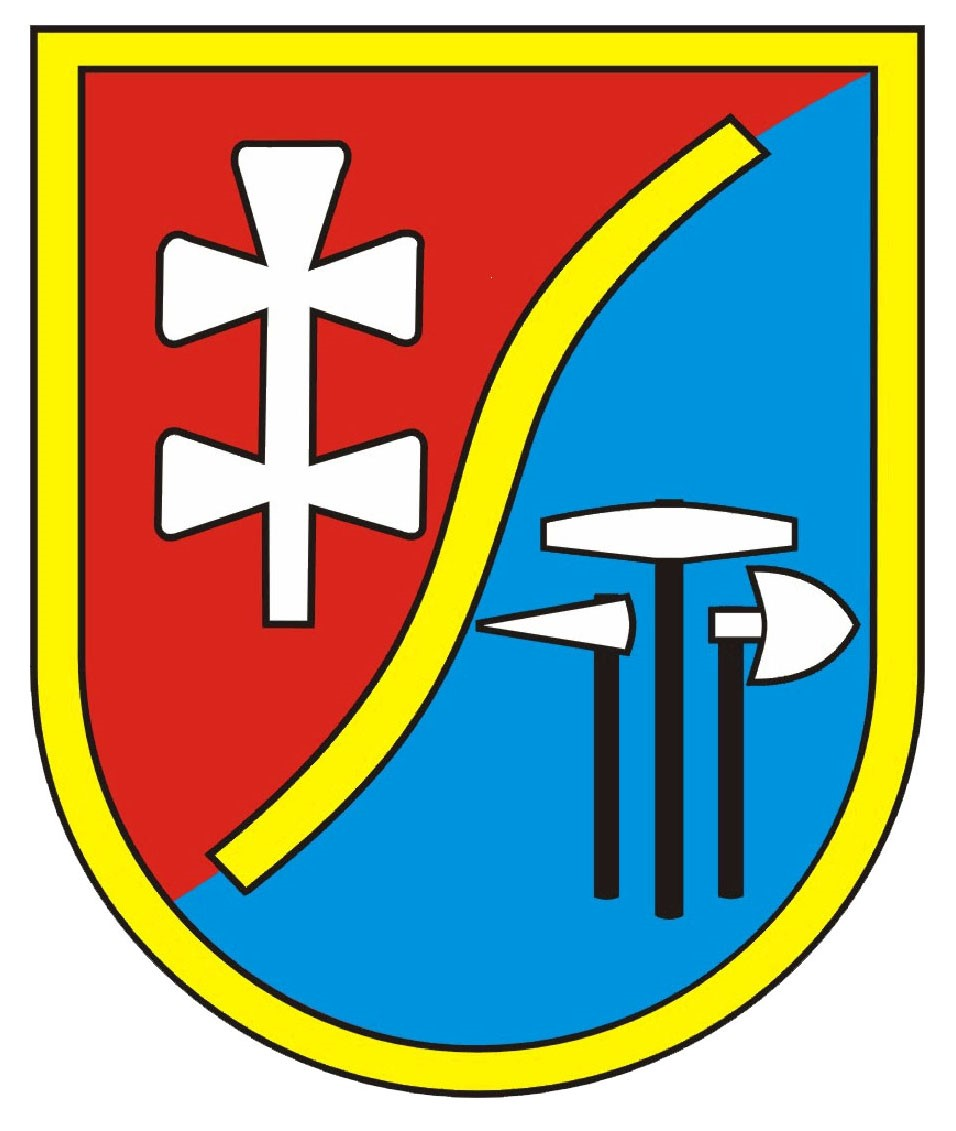
- Coat of arms
- Interactive map of Gmina Bochnia
- Coordinates (Bochnia): 49°59′N 20°26′E
- Country: Poland
- Voivodeship: Lesser Poland
- Seat: Bochnia

Area
  - Total: 131 km^{2} (51 sq mi)

Population (2014)
  - Total: 19,358
  - Density: 148/km^{2} (383/sq mi)
- Website: http://www.bochnia-gmina.pl/

Bochnia Commune (Polish: Gmina Bochnia) is a gmina ("commune" or "municipality") within Lesser Poland Voivodeship in the south of Poland. It is situated on the borderline between two geographical regions: the Sandomierz Basin (Kotlina Sandomierska) in the northern part of the commune's territory, and the Wieliczka Piedmont (Pogórze Wielickie) in the southern part.

The commune consists of 31 townships and covers an area of 131 km2. As of 2014 the number of residents was 19,358. Its territory extends over about 50 km along the Raba and Stradomka rivers and their tributaries. The commune is cut almost in half by the E40 Dresden-Kraków-Lvov International Road, a railway line. The international Kraków-Balice airport is 40 km away.

The area contains flat fields and meadows of the Raba river valley in the north, including the Niepołomice Forest (Puszcza Niepołomicka); and a mountainous area in the south, within sight of the Beskid Wyspowy mountain range.

== Tourism ==
=== Via Regia Antiqua ===
The ancient 'Via Regia Antiqua' is a section of the Amber Route, also called the Royal Route. It proceeds from Bochnia via Łapczyca, Chełm and Moszczenica.

=== Rest and recreational centers ===
Hospice and Ski-Lift at Wola Nieszkowska The hospice located at the village (10 km away from Bochnia) is situated about 350 meters above sea level. It is open all year long next to a trapeze ski-lift.

==== Cycling routes ====
- The Górny Gościniec ('Upper Highway') goes from Bochnia via Łapczyca to Chełm
- The 'Czyżyczka-Berdychów' public road links Gierczyce and Pogwizdów.
- The 'Gorzków-Brzeźnica' loessic gorge.
- The 'Buczyna-Stradomka' public road descending from Borek Hill (Góra Borek).
- Cycling routes around the Niepołomice Virgin Forest and forest cuttings.

== Villages ==
Gmina Bochnia contains the villages and settlements of Baczków, Bessów, Bogucice, Brzeźnica, Buczyna, Cerekiew, Chełm, Cikowice, Dąbrowica, Damienice, Gawłów, Gierczyce, Gorzków, Grabina, Krzyżanowice, Łapczyca, Majkowice, Moszczenica, Nieprześnia, Nieszkowice Małe, Nieszkowice Wielkie, Ostrów Szlachecki, Pogwizdów, Proszówki, Siedlec, Słomka, Stanisławice, Stradomka, Wola Nieszkowska, Zatoka and Zawada.

== Neighbouring gminas ==
Gmina Bochnia is bordered by the town of Bochnia and by the gminas of Drwinia, Rzezawa, Łapanów, Kłaj, Gdów, Nowy Wiśnicz, Trzciana
