= Zatoka, Lesser Poland Voivodeship =

Zatoka
- Village
- Location within Poland
- Coordinates: 50°2′N 20°31′E
- Country: Poland
- Voivodeship: Lesser Poland
- County: Bochnia
- Gmina: Bochnia

Zatoka [zaˈtɔka] is a village in the administrative district of Gmina Bochnia, within Bochnia County, Lesser Poland Voivodeship, in southern Poland.
