= Cerekiew, Lesser Poland Voivodeship =

Cerekiew
- Village
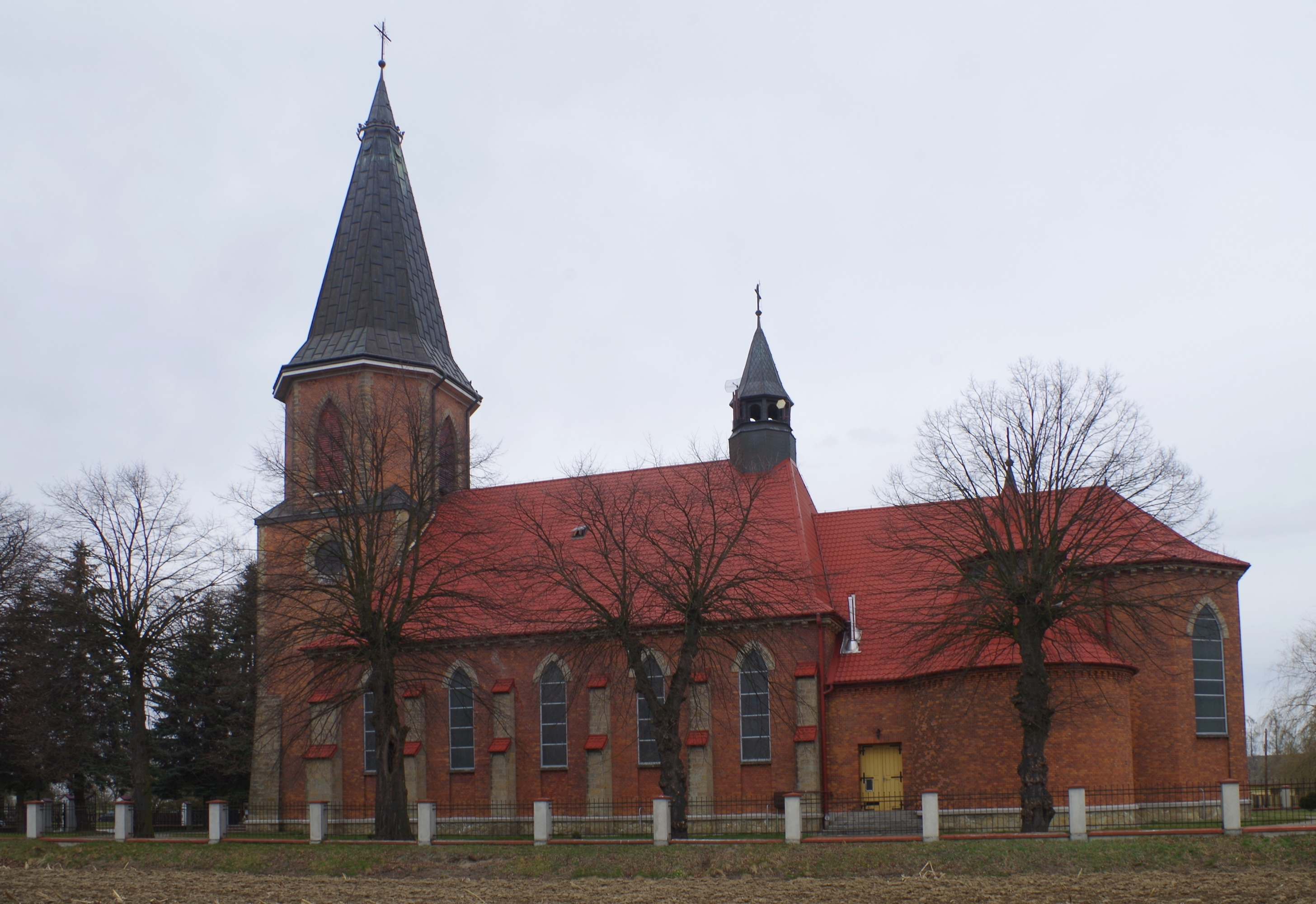
- Church in Cerekiew

- Location within Poland
- Coordinates: 50°5′N 20°30′E
- Country: Poland
- Voivodeship: Lesser Poland
- County: Bochnia
- Gmina: Bochnia
- Population: 328

Cerekiew [t͡sɛˈrɛkʲɛf] is a village in the administrative district of Gmina Bochnia, within Bochnia County, Lesser Poland Voivodeship, in southern Poland.
