= Stradomka, Lesser Poland Voivodeship =

Stradomka
- Village
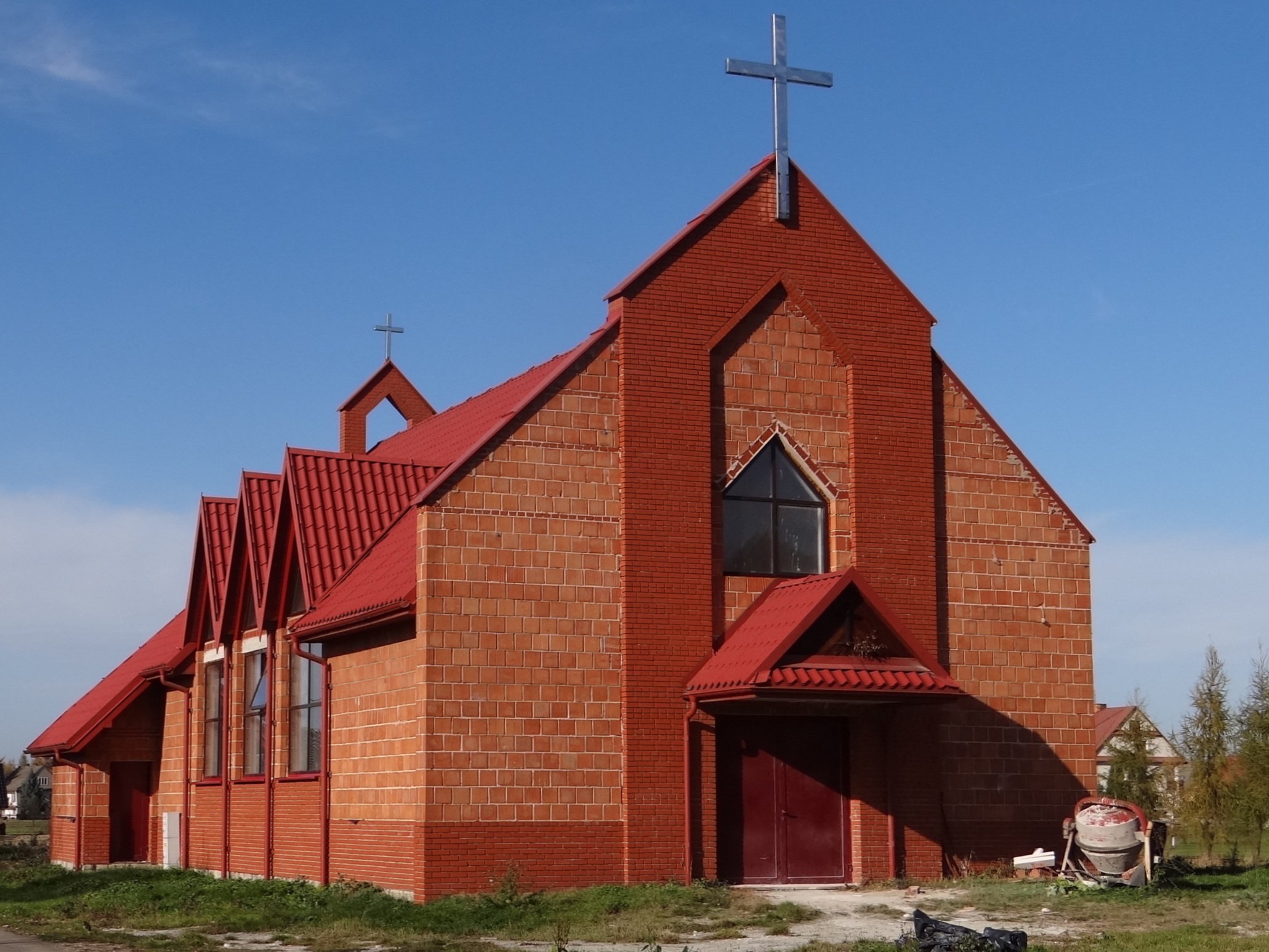
- Local Catholic church

- Location within Poland
- Coordinates: 49°56′N 20°19′E
- Country: Poland
- Voivodeship: Lesser Poland
- County: Bochnia
- Gmina: Bochnia

Stradomka [straˈdɔmka] is a village in the administrative district of Gmina Bochnia, within Bochnia County, Lesser Poland Voivodeship, in southern Poland.
