= Gorzków, Bochnia County =

Gorzków
- Village
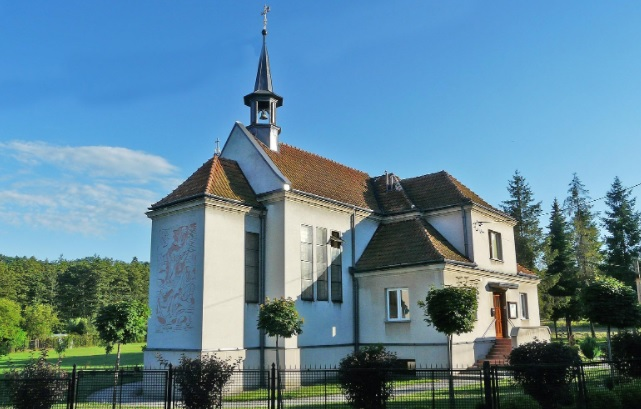
- Catholic church

- Location within Poland
- Coordinates: 49°58′27″N 20°28′53″E
- Country: Poland
- Voivodeship: Lesser Poland
- County: Bochnia
- Gmina: Bochnia
- Population: 450

Gorzków [ˈɡɔʂkuf] is a village in the administrative district of Gmina Bochnia, within Bochnia County, Lesser Poland Voivodeship, in southern Poland.
