= Baczków, Lesser Poland Voivodeship =

Baczków
- Village
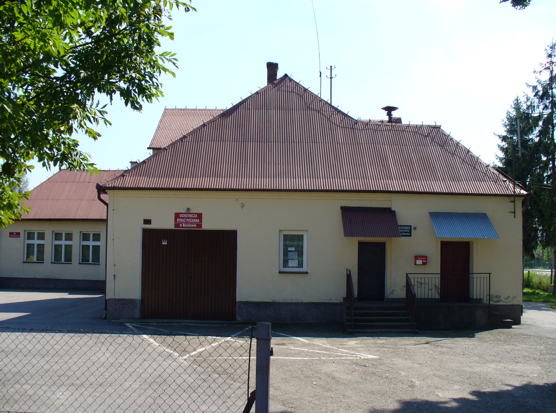
- Fire station and library building

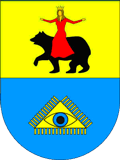
- Coat of arms

- Location within Poland
- Coordinates: 50°2′N 20°26.5′E
- Country: Poland
- Voivodeship: Lesser Poland
- County: Bochnia
- Gmina: Bochnia

Baczków [ˈbat͡ʂkuf] is a village in the administrative district of Gmina Bochnia, within Bochnia County, Lesser Poland Voivodeship, in southern Poland.
