= Stanisławice, Lesser Poland Voivodeship =

Stanisławice
- Village
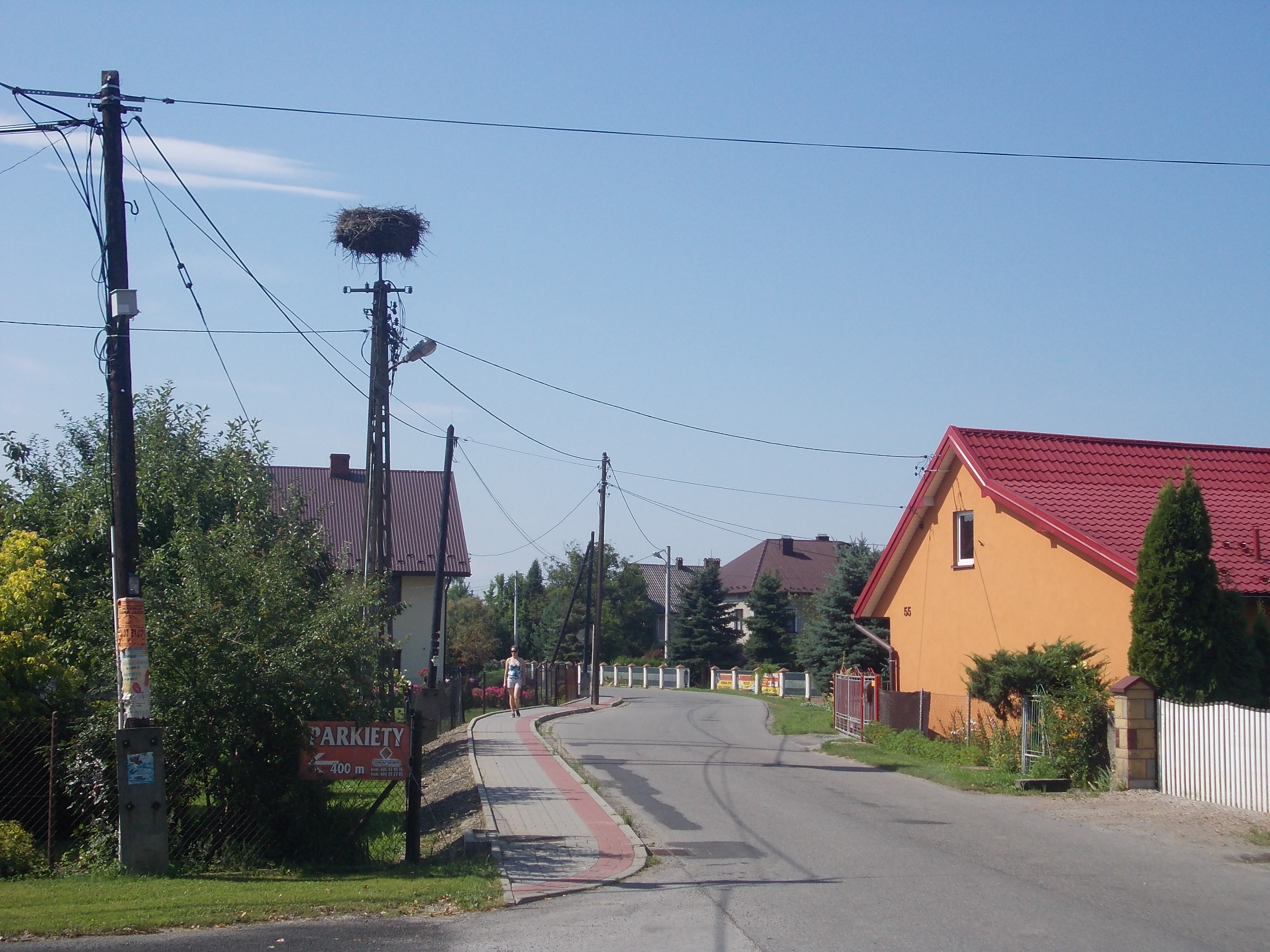

- Location within Poland
- Coordinates: 49°59′30″N 20°21′15″E
- Country: Poland
- Voivodeship: Lesser Poland
- County: Bochnia
- Gmina: Bochnia
- Population: 1,300
- Website: https://stanislawice.pl

Stanisławice [staniswaˈvit͡sɛ] is a village in the administrative district of Gmina Bochnia, within Bochnia County, Lesser Poland Voivodeship, in southern Poland.
