= Pogwizdów, Lower Silesian Voivodeship =

Pogwizdów
- Village
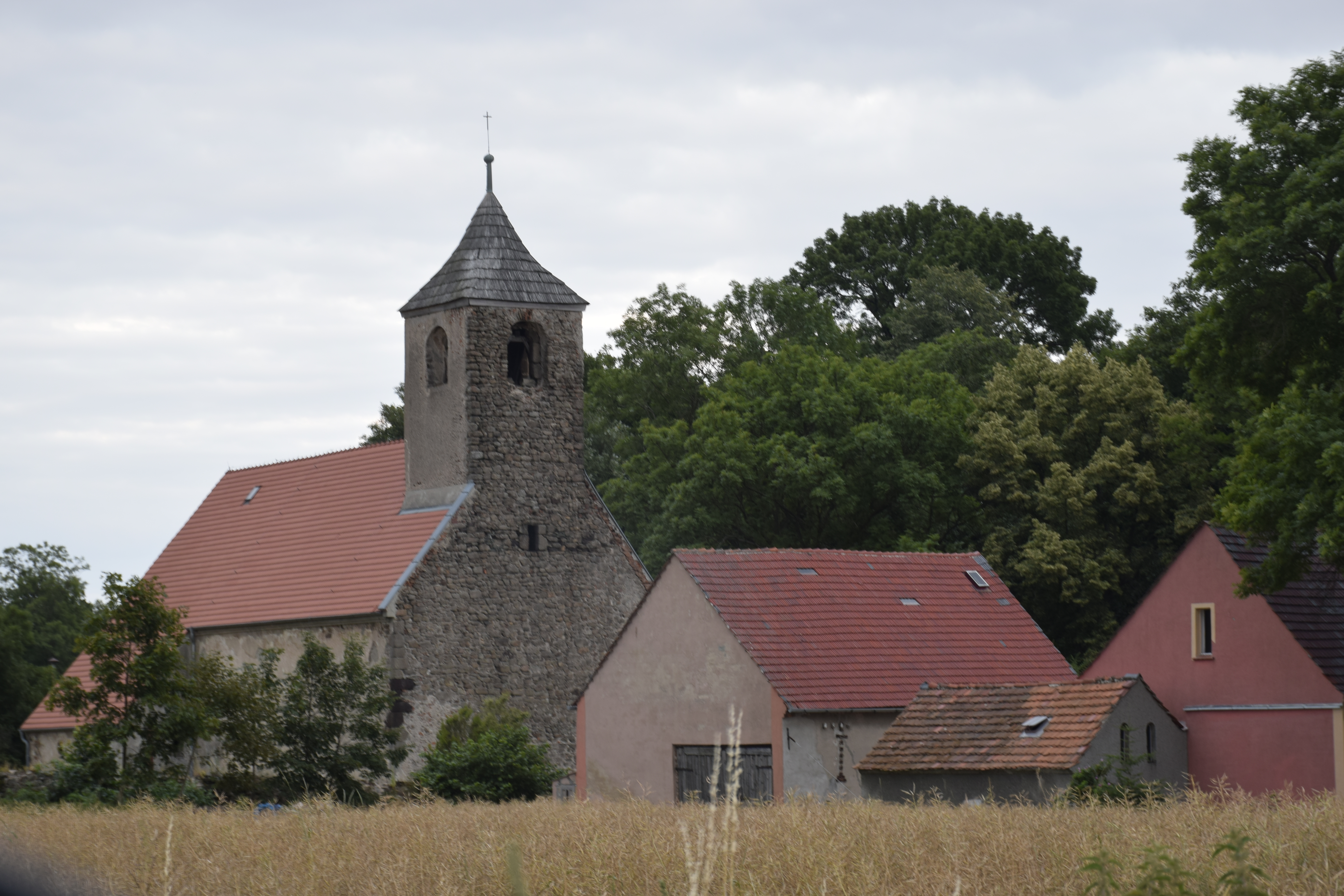
- View of Pogwizdów with the Exaltation of the Holy Cross church

- Location within Poland
- Coordinates: 50°57′53″N 16°05′34″E
- Country: Poland
- Voivodeship: Lower Silesian
- Powiat: Jawor
- Gmina: Paszowice
- First mentioned: 13th century
- Time zone: UTC+1 (CET)
  - Summer (DST): UTC+2 (CEST)
- Vehicle registration: DJA

Pogwizdów [pɔɡˈvizduf] is a village in the administrative district of Gmina Paszowice, within Jawor County, Lower Silesian Voivodeship, in south-western Poland.

== History ==
The village was first mentioned in the 13th century, when it was part of fragmented Piast-ruled Poland. The village's oldest heritage monument, the Romanesque Exaltation of the Holy Cross church, was built in the 13th century. In the 18th century the village was annexed by Prussia, and from 1871 to 1945 it also formed part of Germany. During World War II, a German forced labour subcamp of the prison in Jawor was operated in the village. After the defeat of Nazi Germany in the war in 1945, the village became again part of Poland.

== Gallery ==
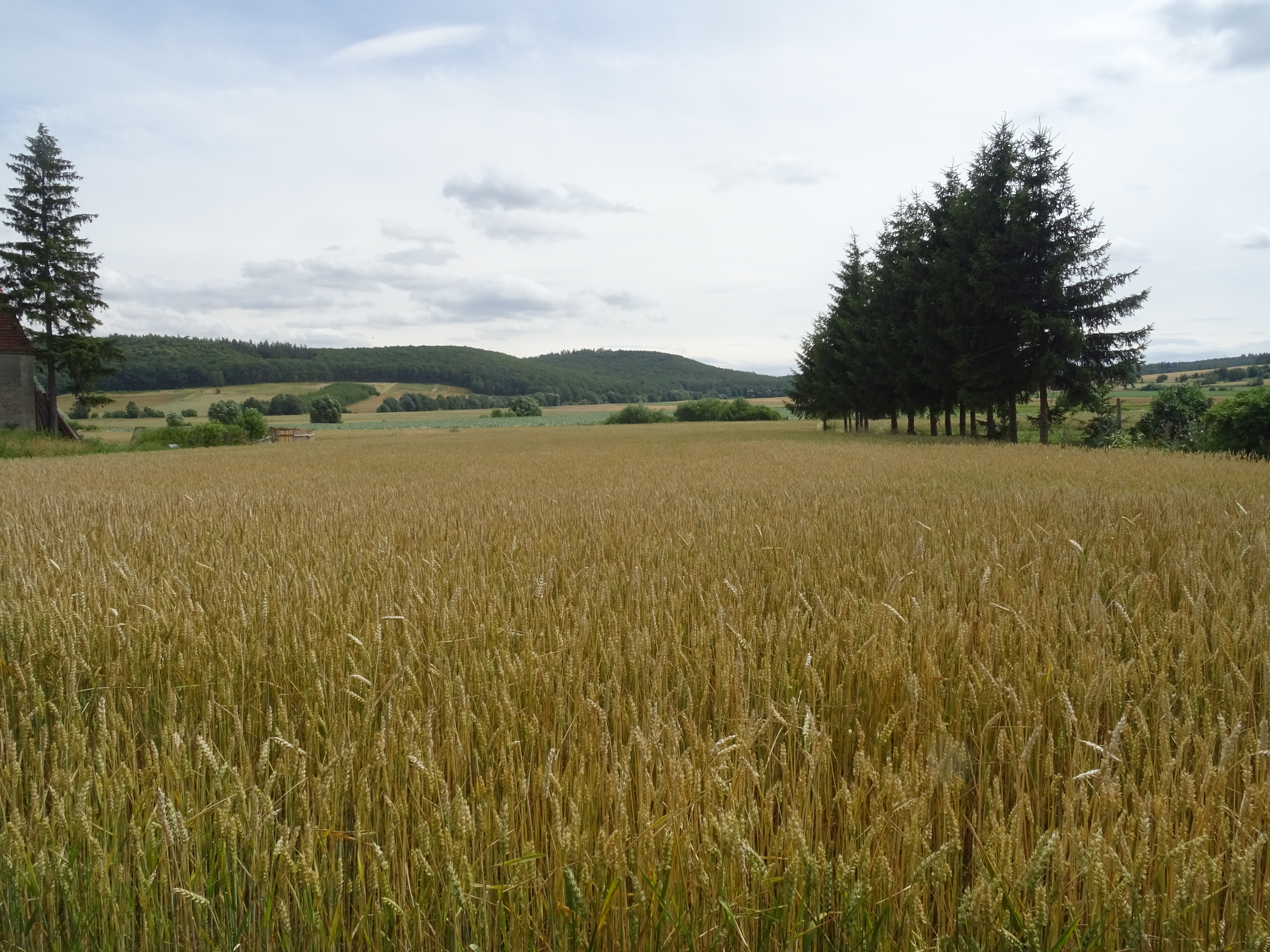
Cornfield

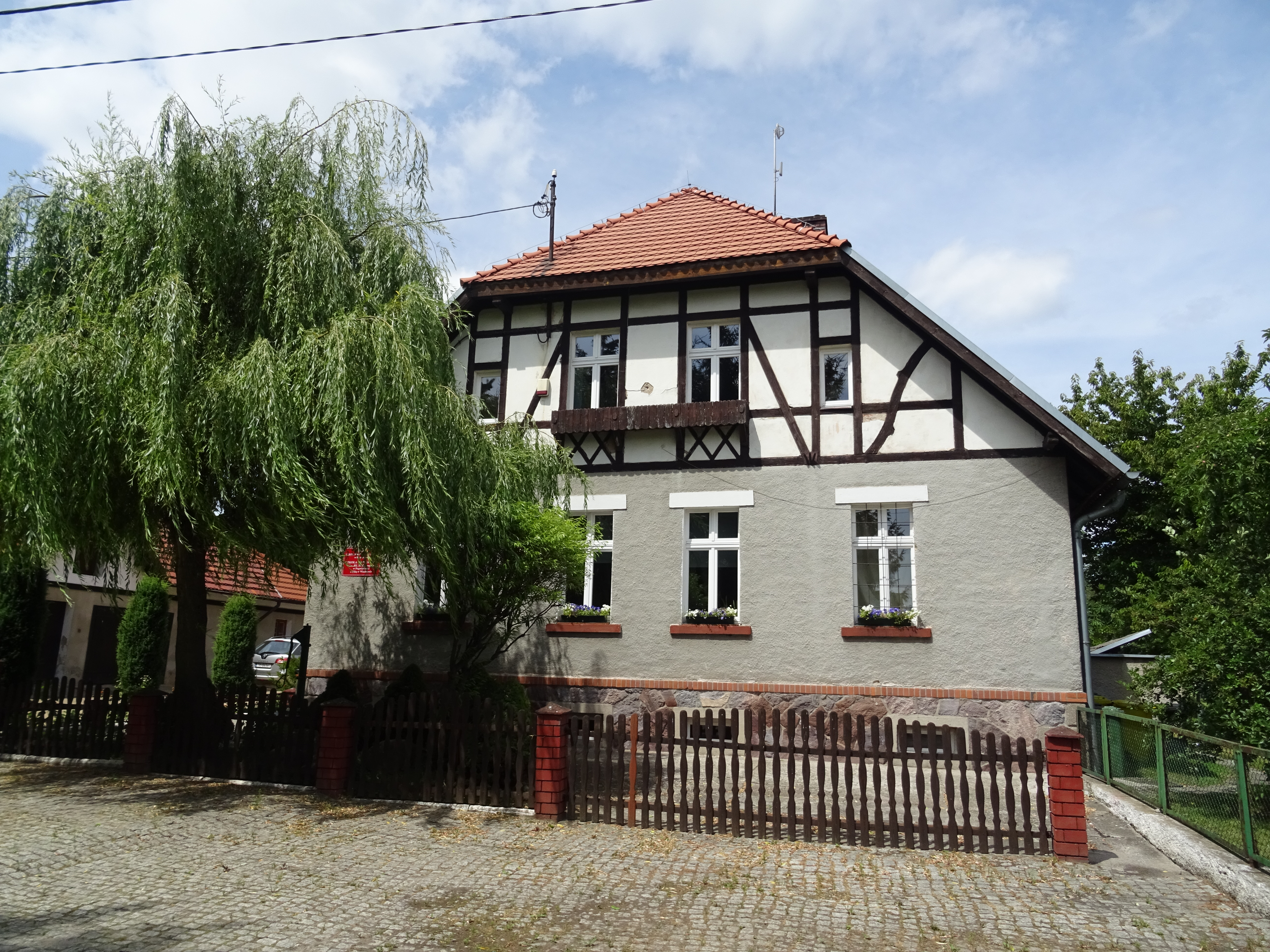
School

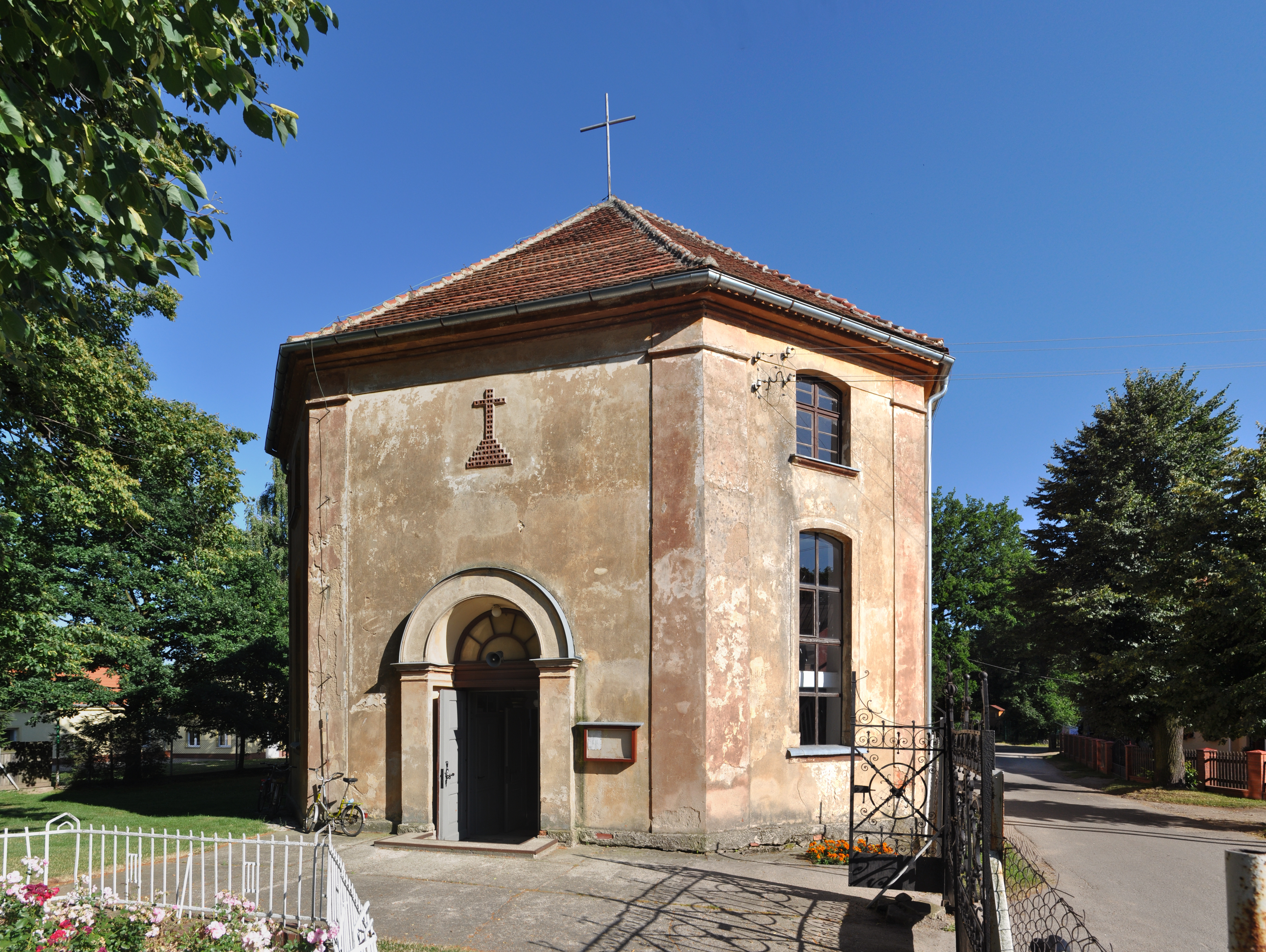
Church of the Ascension of Christ

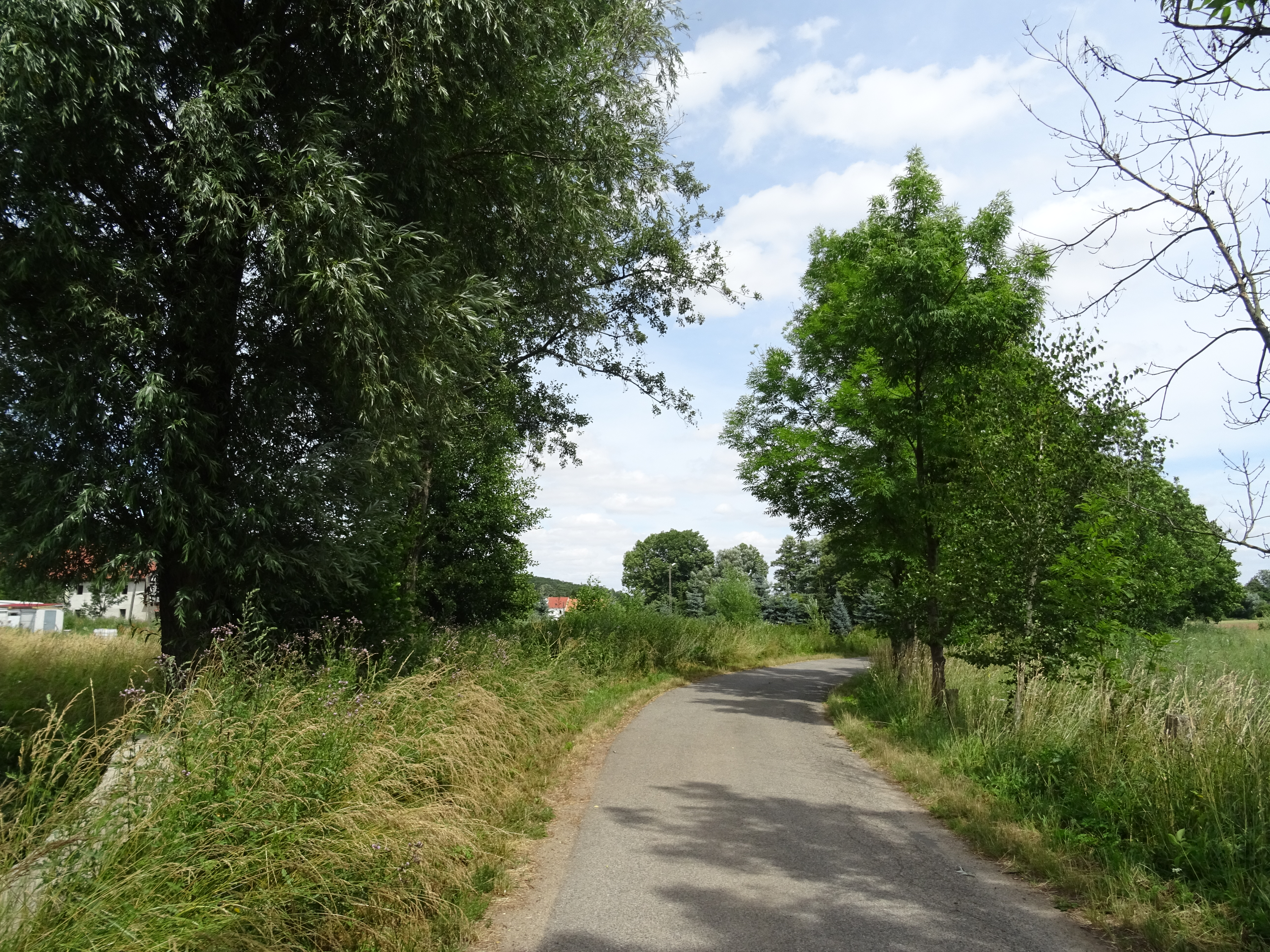
Road
