= Bochnia County =

Bochnia County Powiat bocheński
- County
- Flag Coat of arms

- Location within the voivodeship
- Coordinates (Bochnia): 49°59′N 20°26′E
- Country: Poland
- Voivodeship: Lesser Poland
- Seat: Bochnia
- Gminas: Total 9 (incl. 1 urban): Bochnia; Gmina Bochnia; Gmina Drwinia; Gmina Łapanów; Gmina Lipnica Murowana; Gmina Nowy Wiśnicz; Gmina Rzezawa; Gmina Trzciana; Gmina Żegocina

Area
  - Total: 649.28 km^{2} (250.69 sq mi)

Population (2019)
  - Total: 106,626
  - Density: 164.22/km^{2} (425.33/sq mi)
  - Urban: 32,571
  - Rural: 74,055
- Car plates: KBC
- Website: www.bochnia.starostwo.gov.pl

Bochnia County (Polish: powiat bocheński) is a unit of territorial administration and local government (powiat) in Lesser Poland Voivodeship, southern Poland. It came into being on January 1, 1999, as a result of the Polish local government reforms passed in 1998. Its administrative seat and largest town is Bochnia, which lies 37 kilometres (23 mi) east of the regional capital Kraków. The only other town in the county is Nowy Wiśnicz, lying 8 km (5 mi) south of Bochnia.

The county covers an area of 649.28 square kilometres (250.7 sq mi). As of 2019 its total population is 106,626, out of which the population of Bochnia is 29,814, that of Nowy Wiśnicz is 2,757, and the rural population is 74,055.

== Neighbouring counties ==
Bochnia County is bordered by Proszowice County to the north, Brzesko County to the east, Limanowa County to the south, and Myślenice County, Wieliczka County and Kraków County to the west.

== Administrative division ==
The county is subdivided into nine gminas (one urban, one urban-rural and seven rural). These are listed in the following table, in descending order of population.

Gmina	Type	Area (km^{2})	Population (2019)	Seat
Bochnia	urban	29.9	29,814	
Gmina Bochnia	rural	113.7	19,955	Bochnia *
Gmina Nowy Wiśnicz	urban-rural	82.5	14,085	Nowy Wiśnicz
Gmina Rzezawa	rural	85.5	11,297	Rzezawa
Gmina Łapanów	rural	71.2	8,151	Łapanów
Gmina Drwinia	rural	108.8	6,521	Drwinia
Gmina Lipnica Murowana	rural	60.6	5,649	Lipnica Murowana
Gmina Trzciana	rural	44.1	5,605	Trzciana
Gmina Żegocina	rural	35.2	5,549	Żegocina
* seat not part of the gmina
