= Bzowski family with Ostoja coat of arms =

Family coat of arms

== Bzowski Coat of Arms Ostoja ==
Polish medieval CoA Ostoja

Polish CoA Nowina

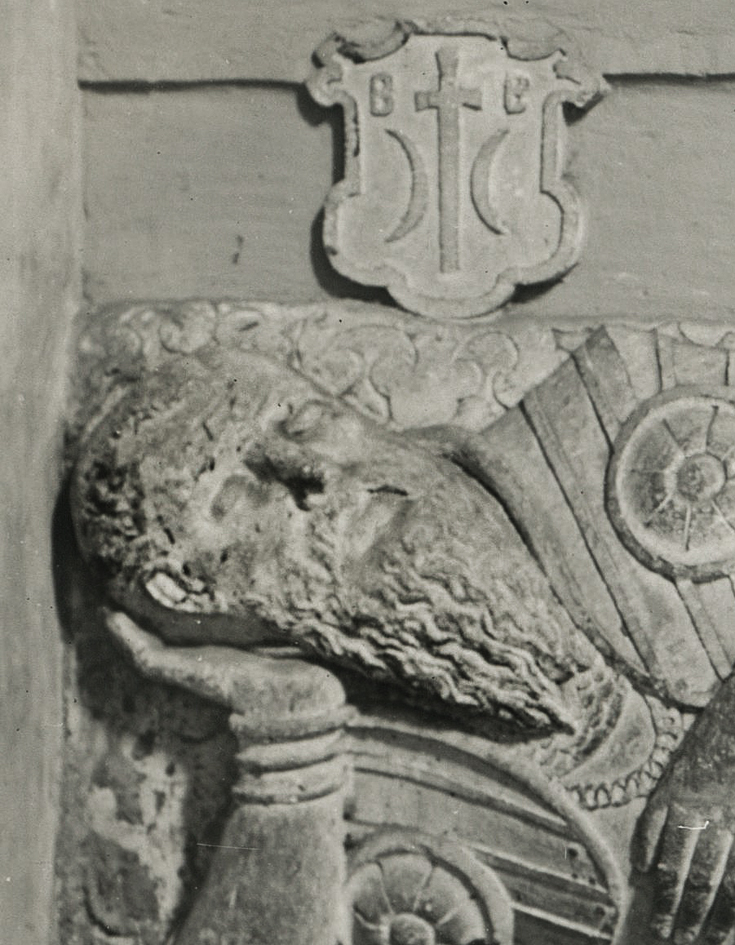
Baltazar Bzowski, Jawor's eldership, fragment of a tombstone in the Cathedral of the Assumption of the Blessed Virgin Mary in Lviv

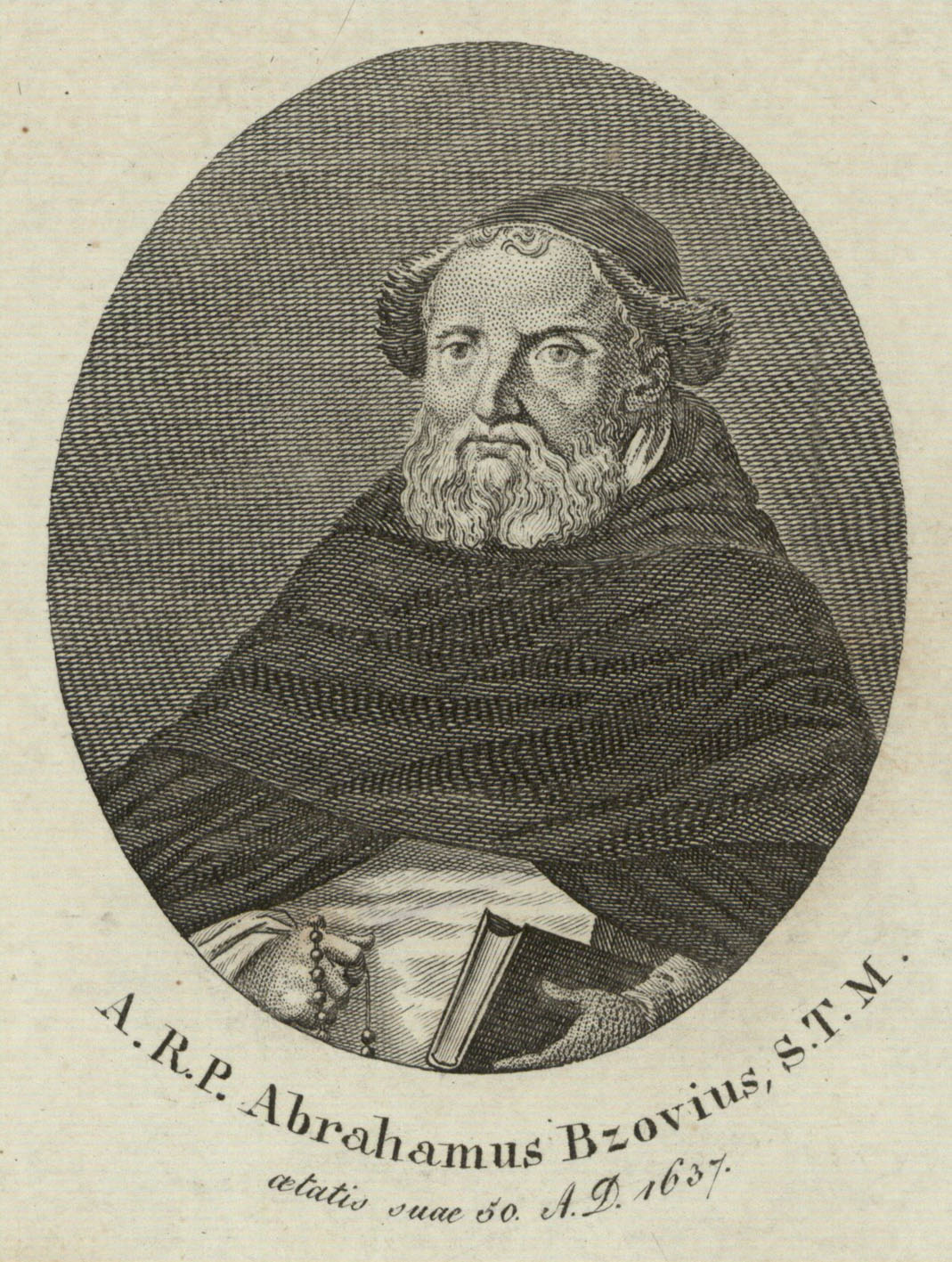
Portrait of a Dominican Abraham Bzowski, a Church historian

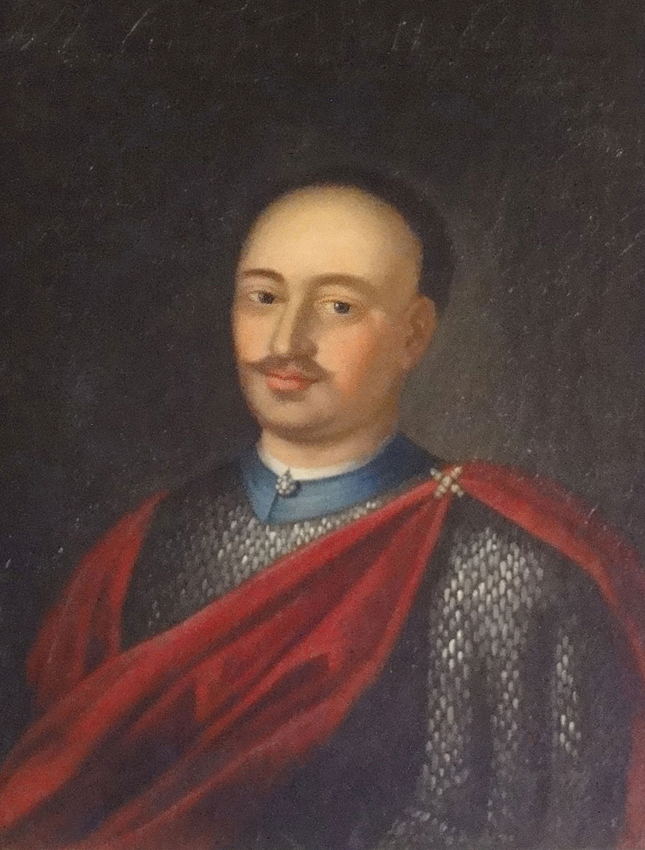
Portrait of Józef Felicjan Janota Bzowski

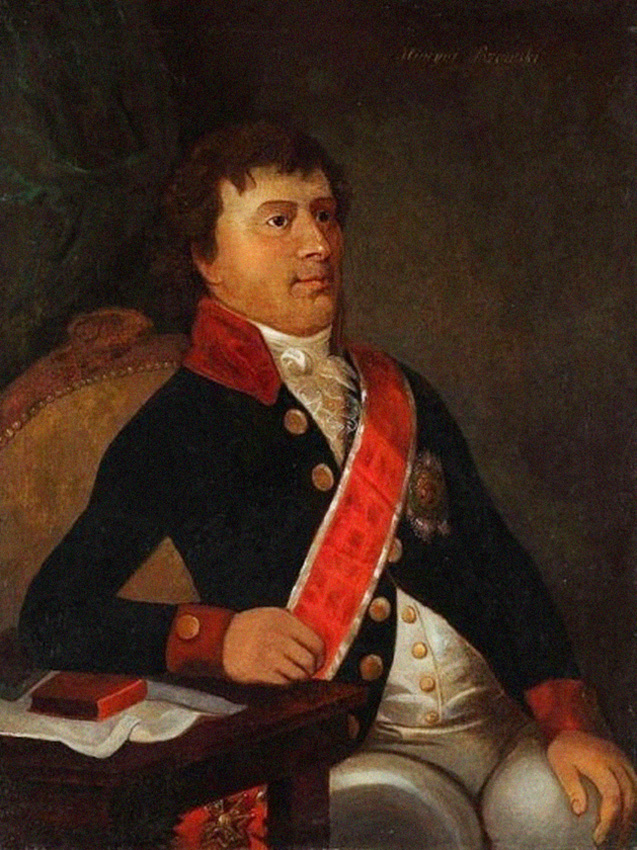
Portrait of Hyacinth Janota Bzowski

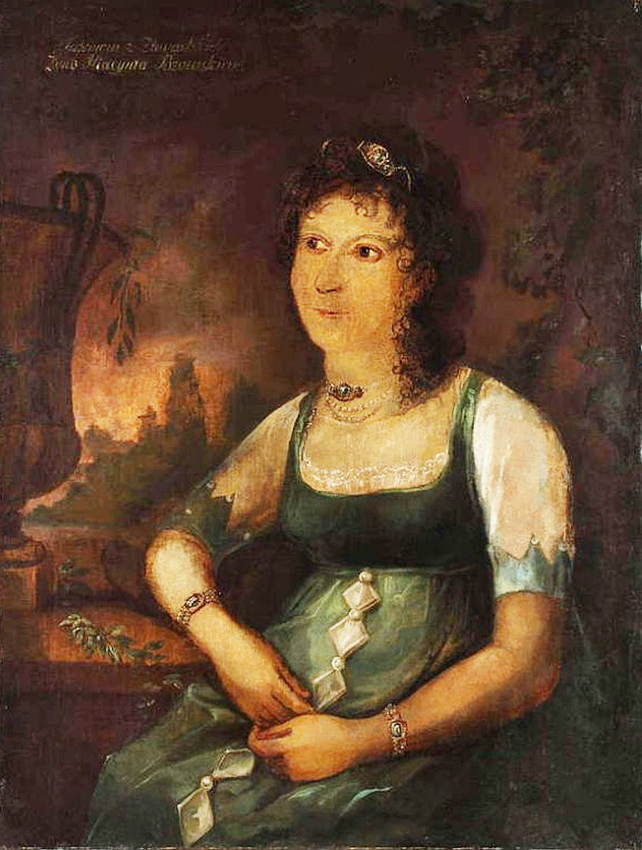
Portrait of Salomea Zawadzka, wife of Hiacynt Janota Bzowski

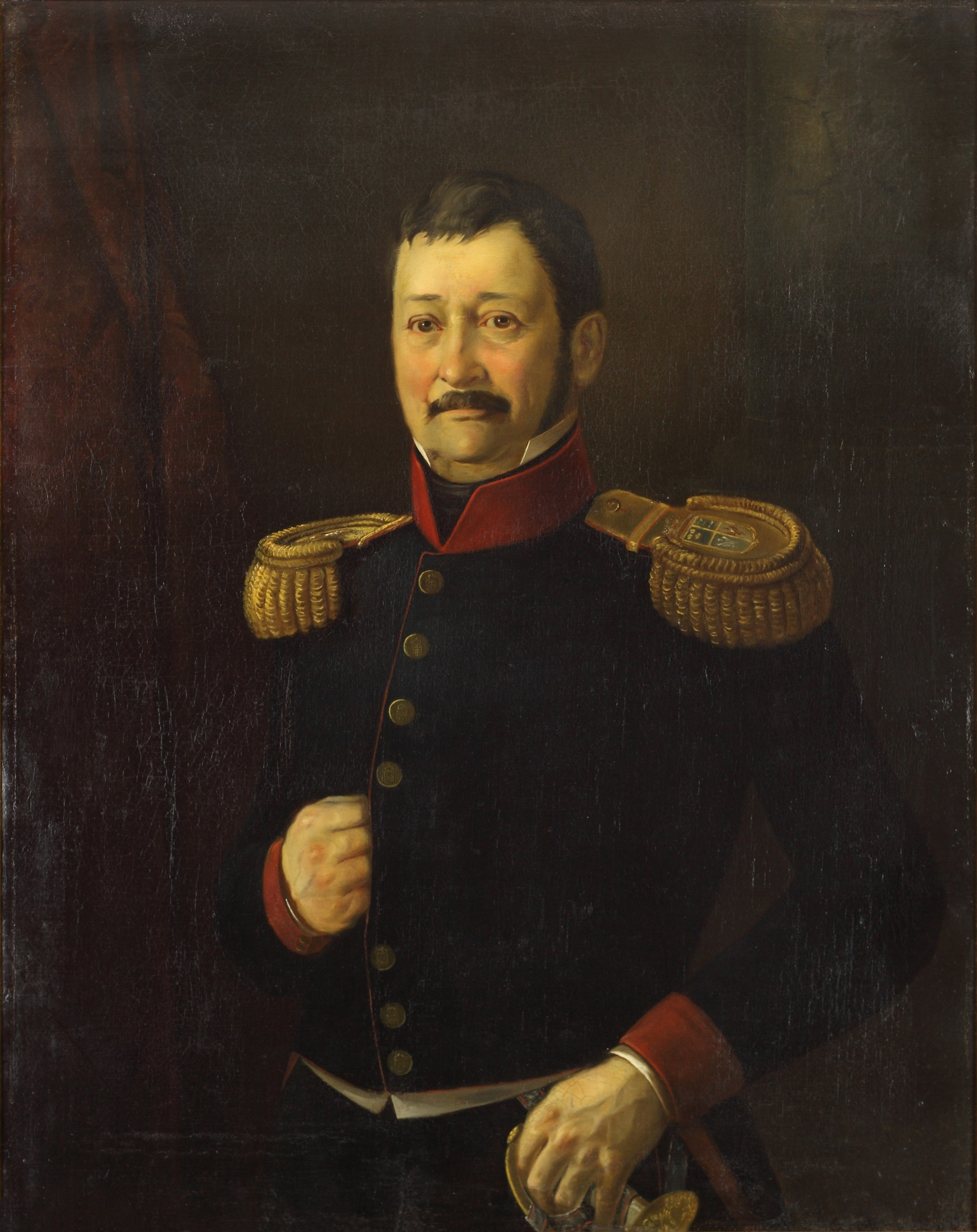
Portrait of Kazimierz Janota Bzowski

The Bzowski family (born Janota Bzowski) - a Polish noble family with the Ostoja coat of arms, belonging to the heraldic Clan Ostoja (Moscics), originating from Bzów in the former region of Krakow, Lelowski district. Bzów was a noble village in which, apart from the representatives of Ostoja, the knights of other coats of arms - Cielątkowa, Nowina, Prus, Pilawa, Przeginia and Zadora also inherited.

== Family surname ==
The surname of the Bzowski family of the Ostoja coat of arms is the nickname Janota derived from the name of Jan. The first found in the Bzowski family of the Ostoja CoA was Maciej Janota from Bzów, who appeared in 1464. Maybe Maciej Janota was identical with Maciej Janota, who appeared in 1432, was Maciej from Bzów, the son of Jan, who was suing Jerzy, called Liga, peasants from Żukowice for part of the field in Bzów. According to Seweryn, Count Uruski, at the beginning of the 15th century, lived Jan of Bzów called Janota, who had sons: Jan, Maciej and Mokołaj. From his nickname, the Ostojowie Bzowski family were to take the nickname Janota combined with the surname.

== The oldest source certificates concerning the family ==
Listed below are selected source certificates concerning the Bzowski family, the Ostoja CoA up to the mid-16th century.

- The oldest mention of the village of Bzów comes from 1349, when King Casimir the Great confirmed the division of the estate between the brothers Miczek and Marcin Panki, the heirs of Bzów and Ochonin (today Ochojno). Miczko received Bzów and Łukanowice and Marcin Ochonin.
- The oldest record concerning a representative of the Bzowski family, Ostoja CoA concerns Marek of Bzów, who in 1388 bought from his brother Stanisław for 16 fines a house, a garden and fields in Bzów, which once belonged to their mother. In 1398 he commanded his nobility and belonging to the Ostoje family (he was reprimanded in the nobility by Jaszek of Tązów).
- In 1464, Maciej Janota from Bzów, who that year had a case with Piotr Wojszyk from Bzów, appears in the sources.
- In the years 1470-1480 the brothers Masz and Jakub from Bzów, Ostoja coat of arms and Jan alias Janota and Maciej, Ostoja from Bzów are mentioned. Długosz mentions them in Liber beneficiorum dioecesis Cracoviensis as heirs of Bzów.
- In 1471, Apolonia, wife of Jan Janota, together with her children: Mikołaj, Stanisław, Jadwiga and Anna, sued Imram and Piotr of Ogrodzieniec.
- In 1482, Janota from Bzów took a trial against Jan, Gotard and Stanisław from Bzów.
- Adam Boniecki mentioned Andrzej Janota from Bzów, who lived in the second half of the 15th century. According to Boniecki, in 1483 Jadwiga, the daughter of Jan Janota from Bzów, was the wife of Stanisław Dulowski from Karlino.
- In 1489, brothers Stanisław and Gotard from Bzów gave way to Piotr of Bzów and Bystrzyca, a garden in the middle of Bzów near Janota.
- In 1493, John called Janotha from Bzów had a deadline to swear against Stanisław from Bzów. The case concerned a fence in which Stanisław did not knock down three spans.
- In 1508, the dispute about tithing between the parson in Kromołów and Janota from Bzów and several other heirs in Bzów was settled in favor of the parish priest.
- In 1535, there was Jakub Janota from Bzów, against whom Grzegorz Kopertko from Bzów protested that Jakub did not make a certain entry in the files. The same Jakub Janota had a son, Jakub Janota (junior), who in 1556 sued Walenty Woysza, the heir of a part of Bzów, for wounding. That year he was sued by the aforementioned Walenty Woysza for 30 fines for an armed attack and wounding. Jakub Janota (junior) married Katarzyna, daughter of Jan Rowieński. Jakub Janota (senior), apart from son Jakub (junior), also had a daughter Małgorzata, wife of Maciej Zagórowski and several sons: Paweł, married to Krystyna Woyszykówna from Bzów, Jan, Maciej and Wojciech, husband of Dorota Kmicianka.

== The estates belonging to the family ==
Listed below are the most important lands belonging to the Janoty Bzowski of the Ostoja CoA and later of the Nowina CoA.

Bzów, Tązów (now part of Karlina), Droginia, Gruszów, Karniowice, Sutków, Radwan, Sufczyn, Będkowice, Nieczajna i Rosiejów.

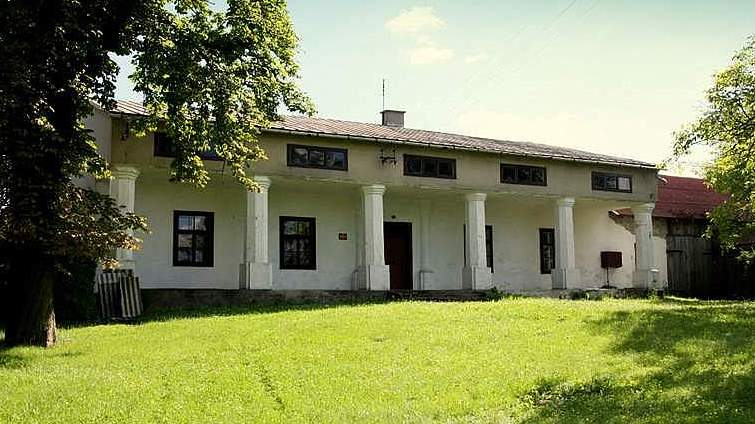
Manor house in Bzów

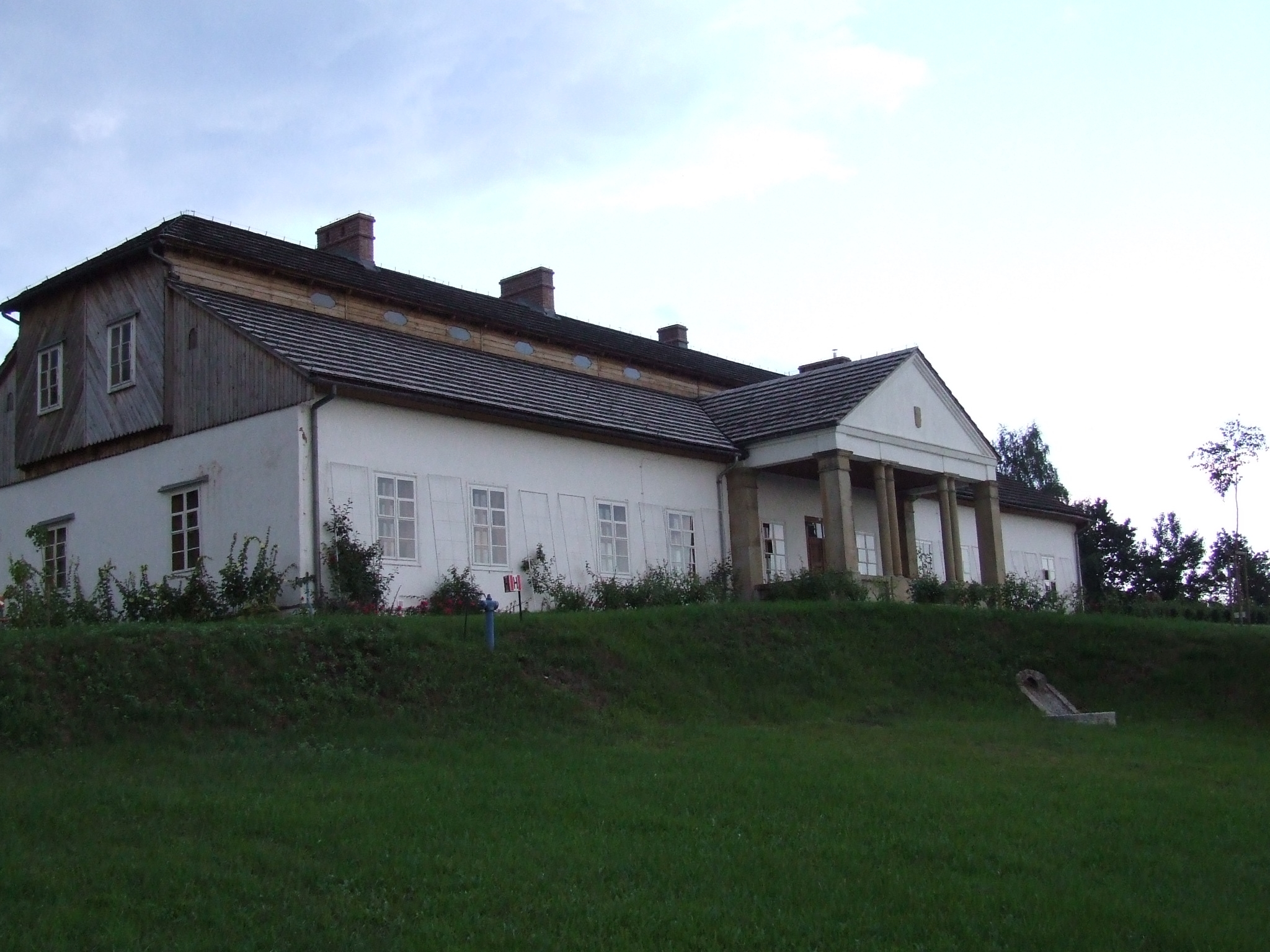
Manor Bzowski from Droginia in the open-air museum in Wygiełzów

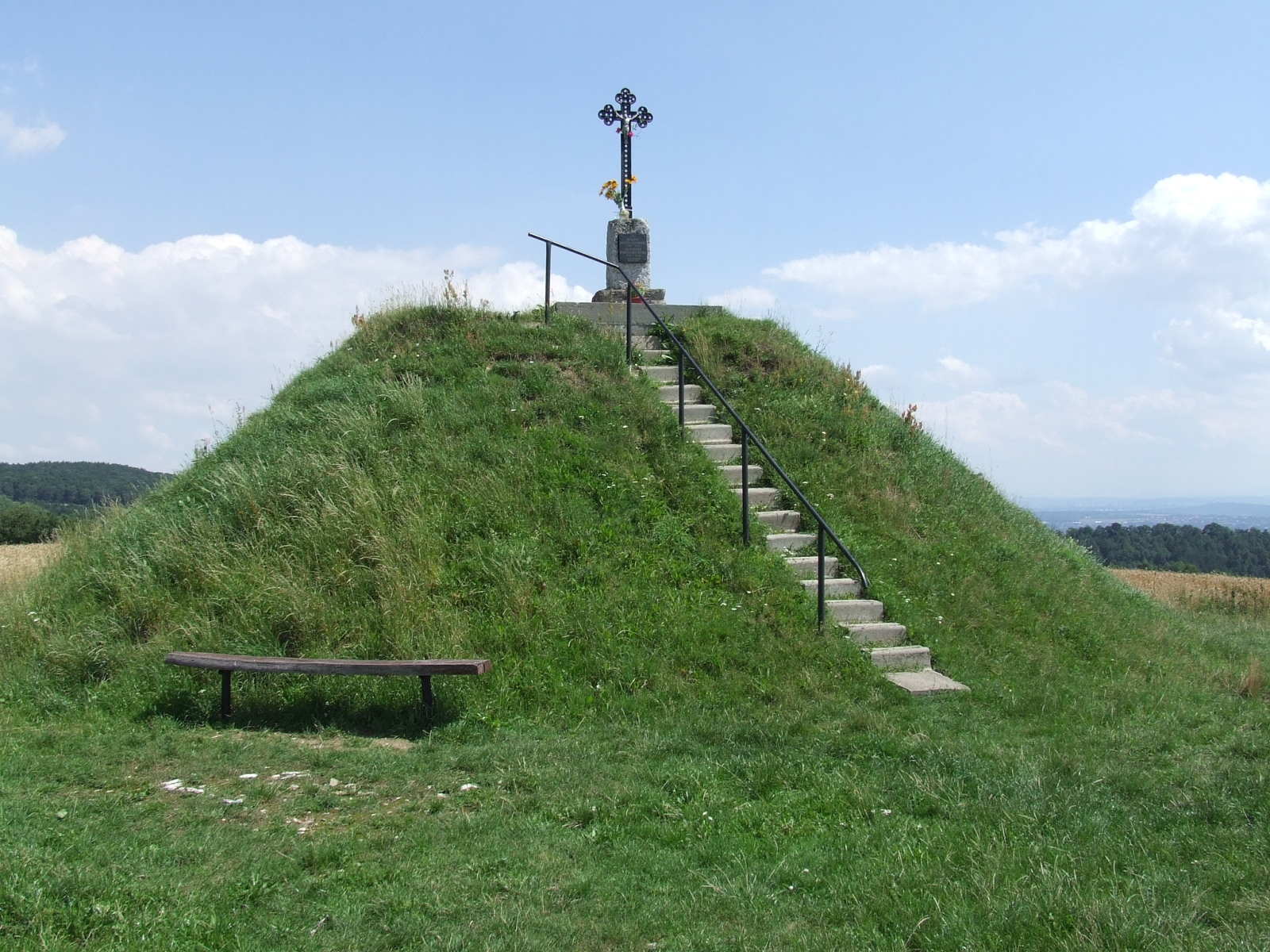
The Bzowski Mound in Będkowice

== Family representatives ==
- Marek of Bzów (died after 1405) - heir of land estates in Bzów and Tązów (now part of Karlino).
- Baltazar Bzowski (1514-1574) - the owner of land estates in Bzów, Jawor's elders.
- Abraham Bzowski (born Stanisław Bzowski from Proszowice) (1567-1637) - a Dominican, representative of the Counter-Reformation movement, church historian, hagiographer and preacher.
- Aleksander Janota Bzowski (died 1704) - steward of Nowogrudok.
- Józef Felicjan Janota Bzowski (1704-1770) - the town regent of Sandek, the steward of Owruch, the burgrave of Kraków, the owner of the landed estates: Gruszów, Karniowice, Sutków, Radwan, Sufczyn, Będkowice, Nieczajna and Rosiejów in the province. Krakowskie and Berezówka, Politanka and Pilinówka in the province. Podolski. Son of Aleksander Janota Bzowski, a Nowogrodzka carpenter, and Marcela Gawrońska, Świnka coat of arms. After his father's death, from his infancy he was brought up in his mother's family, having no close relatives who lived after the sword. For unknown reasons, perhaps as a result of a mistake, he was the first of the Janoty Bzowski to start using the Nowina coat of arms instead of the family Ostoja. Since then, successive generations of Janoty Bzowski use the Nowina coat of arms to this day.
- Hiacent (Jacek) Janota Bzowski, Nowina coat of arms (1750-1808) - burgrave of Kraków, Member of Parliament, inspector of the treasury of the Grand Duchy of Lithuania, civil and military commissioner. He was the son of Józef Felicjan and Teofila née Jordan. Kasper Niesiecki mentions it in "Polish Herbarz" as Bzowski's coat of arms Ostoja.
- Kazimierz Janota-Bzowski, Nowina coat of arms (1792-1862) - captain of the army of the Duchy of Warsaw, adjutant of Prince Józef Poniatowski, participant in the Battle of Leipzig, a Galician landowner. He owned numerous lands, namely: Lipnica Dolna with the village council, Lipnica Górna, Królówka, Droginia and others.
- Władysław Bzowski (born Władysław Roman Erazm Kazimierz Janota Bzowski), Nowina coat of arms (1885-1945]) - lieutenant-colonel in the cavalry of the Polish Army.

== See also ==
- Ostoja CoA
- Clan Ostoj (Moscics)

== Bibliography ==
- T. Jurek (red.), Słownik historyczno-geograficzny ziem polskich w średniowieczu, Instytut Historii Polskiej Akademii Nauk, 2010-2019, Kraków, część I, s. 310-313.
- K. Niesiecki, Herbarz polski, wyd. J.N. Bobrowicz, Lipsk 1839-1845, t. II, s. 389-390.
- A. Boniecki, Herbarz polski, Warszawa 1899, t. II, s. 300-307.
- S. Uruski, Rodzina. Herbarz szlachty polskiej, Warszawa 1905, t. II, s. 121-124.
- J. Janota Bzowski (red.), Łącznik Rodzinny: organ Związku Rodowego Janotów Bzowskich h. Nowina, Warszawa 1937-2012, zeszyty: I-IV, VI.
- B. Ulanowski (red.), Najdawniejsze księgi sądowe krakowskie. Antiquissimi libri iudiciales terrae Cracoviensis, Kraków 1884-1886.
- Starodawne prawa polskiego pomniki z ksiąg rękopiśmiennych dotąd nieużytych główniej zaś z ksiąg dawnych sądowych ziemskich i grodzkich ziemi krakowskiej, wyd. A. Z. Helcel, Kraków 1870.
- A. Przeździecki (oprac.), Jana Długosza kanonika krakowskiego dzieła wszystkie. T. VIII, Liber beneficiorum dioecesis cracoviensis nunc primum e codice autographo editus, Kraków 1864, t. II, s. 211.
- K. Potkański, Zagrodowa szlachta i włodycze rycerstwo, Kraków 1888, s. 45.
