= Wiśnicz Castle =

Nowy Wiśnicz Castle
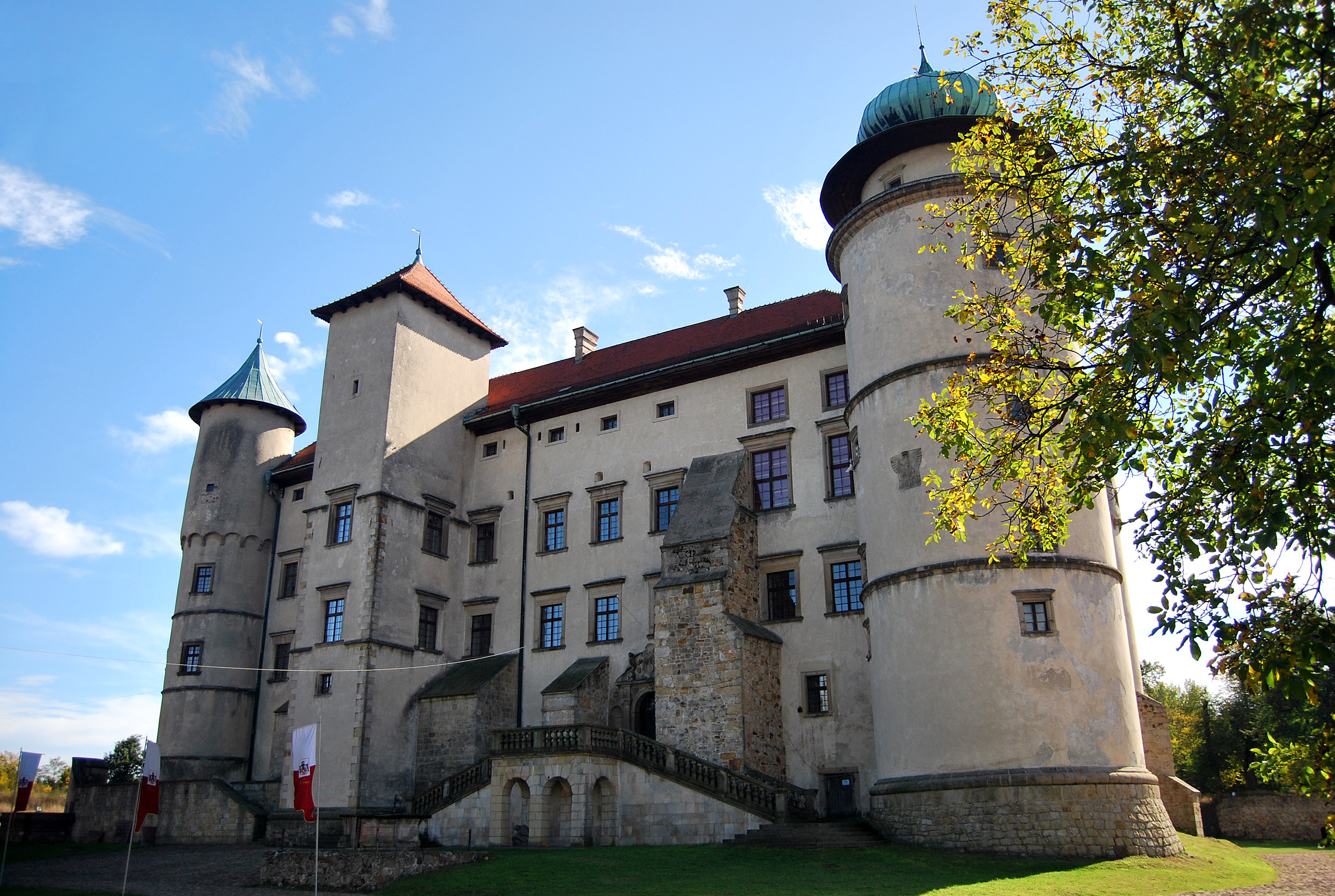
- Nowy Wiśnicz Castle

- Location of Nowy Wiśnicz Castle in Poland
- 49°54′56″N 20°27′53″E
- Location: Stary Wiśnicz, Lesser Poland Voivodeship; Poland

History
- Built: 1397

Site notes
- Architectural style: Baroque

Nowy Wiśnicz Castle – a castle located on a forested hill by the River Leksandrówka in the village of Stary Wiśnicz, Lesser Poland Voivodeship; in Poland. The castle was raised by Jan Kmita in the second half of the fourteenth century. The castle was built in the Baroque architectural style with Renaissance elements. The castle was built on the plan of the quadrilateral with the inner courtyard. The castle has four towers, with one in each corner. The castle is surrounded by bastion fortifications and the main gate from the early 17th century.

== History ==
The castle has an irregular shape. In the 1590s and 1610s, it had a four-wing structure, three towers and fortifications surrounding the castle with two gates. After the year 1516, Piotr Kmita expanded the castle. After his death in 1553, the castle came into ownership of the Barzów in 1566, which ceded ownership rights of the castle to the Stadnickis. In 1593 Sebastian Lubomirski bought the castle. In between the years of 1615 to 1621, Sebastian's son, Stanisław Lubomirski, undertook the expansion of the castle. The architect Maciej Trapola drew up the project of the Baroque reconstruction and bastion fortifications. During the Deluge the Swedes looted and destroyed the castle. After Sweden was defeated by the Polish–Lithuanian Commonwealth, the castle was restored to the Lubomirski family, which carried out restoration works which have not been completed.

After the first half of the eighteenth century, the castle became the property of the Sanguszko, Potocki, and Zamoyski noble families, but after the Third Partition of Poland, the castle started falling into decline, and in 1831 the castle was destroyed by a fire and left abandoned. In the year of 1901, the castle was bought by Professor Maurycy Straszewski of the Lubomirski Ancestral Federation (Zjednoczenie Rodowe Lubomirskich) which had commenced the renovation the castle. From 1928, Adolf Szyszko-Bohusz supervised renovation, however further renovation was stopped due to the outbreak of World War II. After World War II, the castle was seized by the state, and from the year of 1949, renovation was conducted by Alfred Majewski, which was to restore the castle to its former structure. The history of the castle is enlivened by many legends (the legend of the Queen Bona, the legend of the "flyers", the legend of the stone "mushroom"). Many well-known artists (Marcin Bielski, Klemens Janicki, Juliusz Kossak, Jan Matejko, Stanisław Orzechowski, Stanisław Wyspiański) visited the castle in centuries past.

== Legend ==
The Flyers' Legend (Polish: legenda o lotnikach) is the most well-known legend associated with the castle. It is connected with the construction of the castle during which a number of Turkish or Tatar captives from the Battle of Chocim participated. The legend has it that they attempted to escape from captivity by jumping from the castle hill using self-constructed wings. However, their efforts failed and they fell down not far from the castle. The places of their falls where marked by columns, which have been preserved until today. The first column from 1646 is located nearby the Nowy Wiśnicz High School, the second one dating from 1654 stands in the village of Kopaliny, the third one was erected in 1747 in Łomna while the fourth one from 1762 is in Bochnia.

== Gallery ==
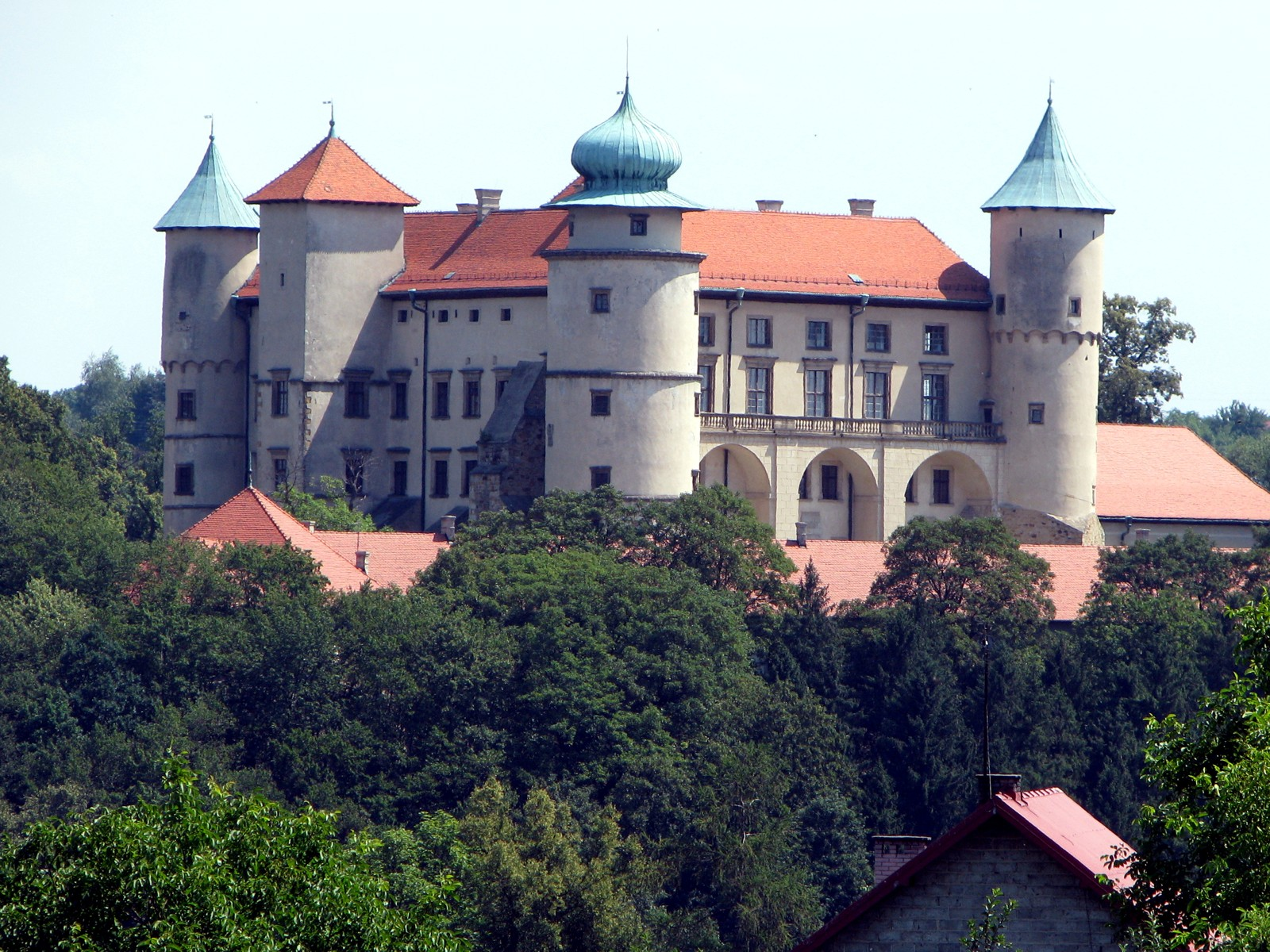
General view

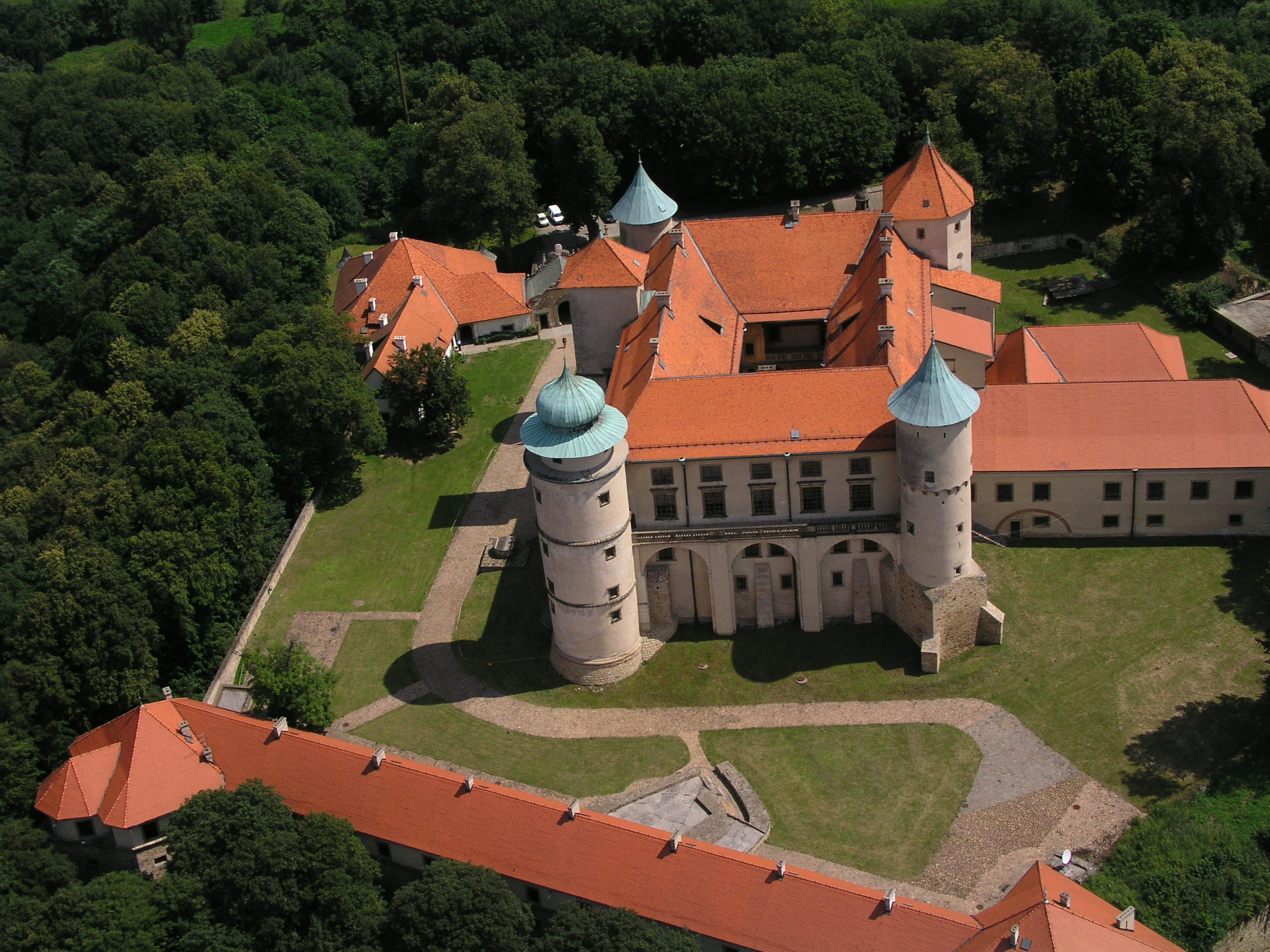
Aerial view

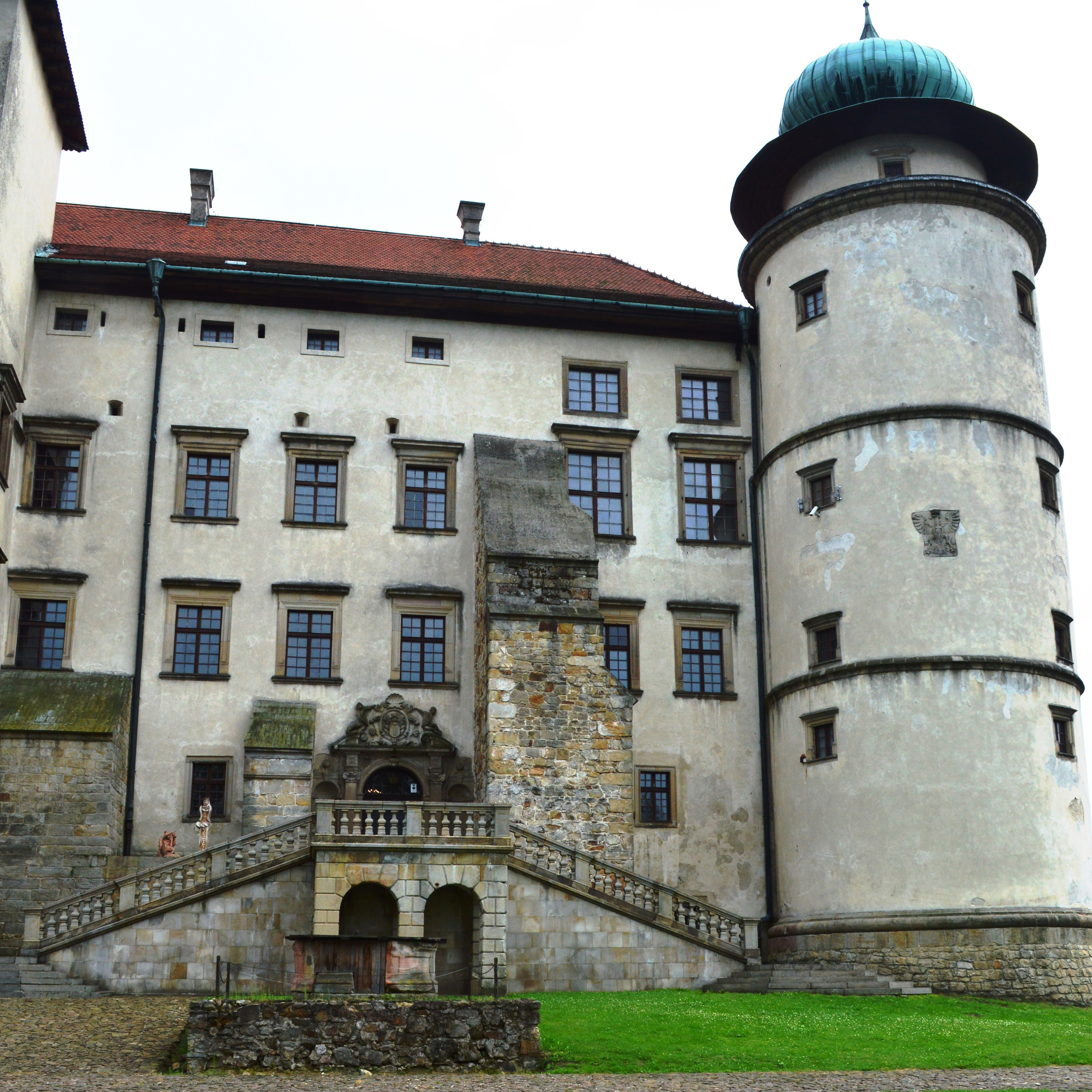
Castle tower

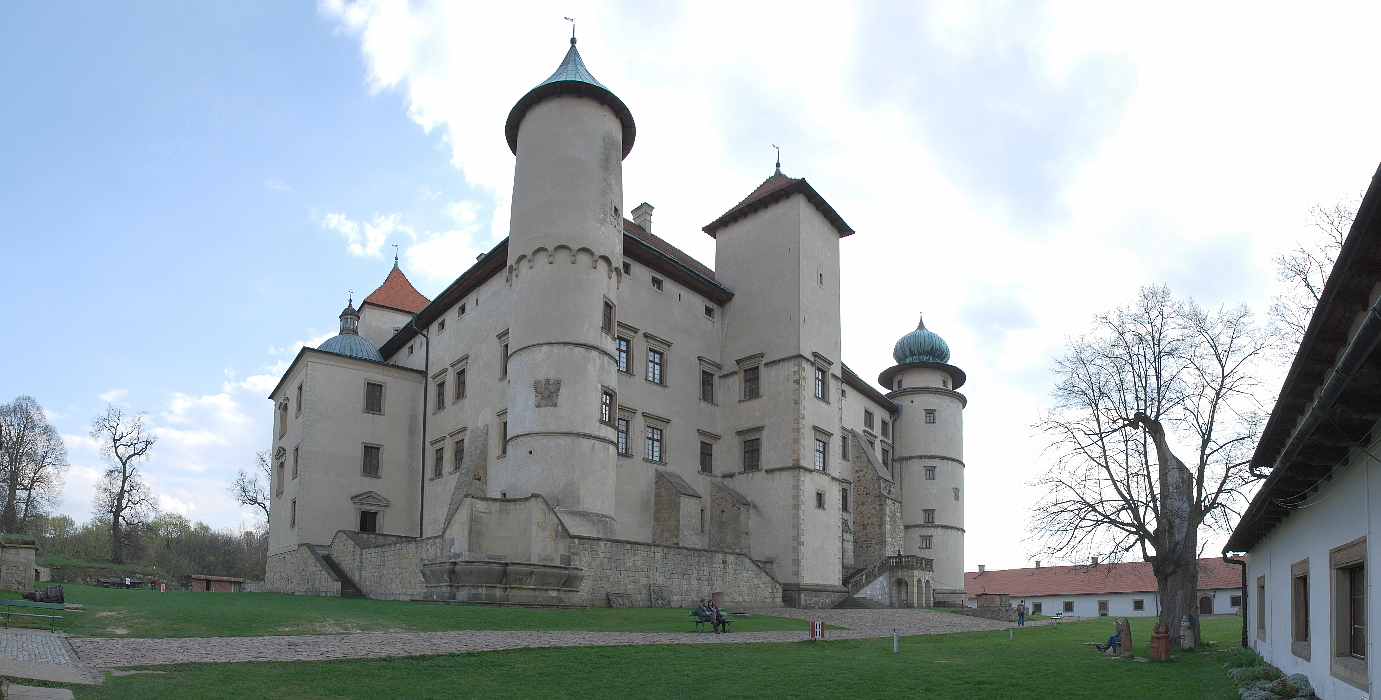
The castle and outbuildings

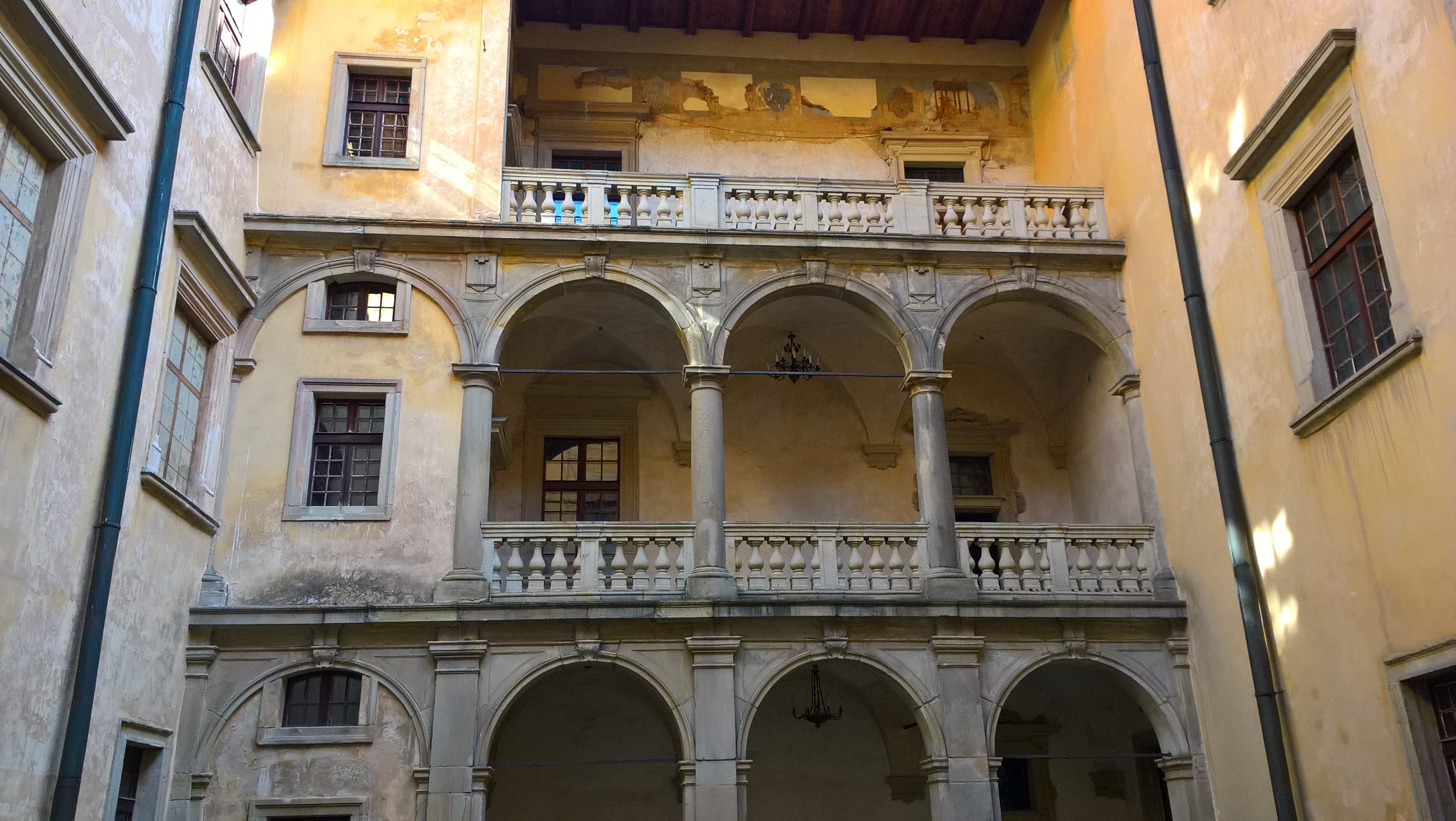
Inner courtyard

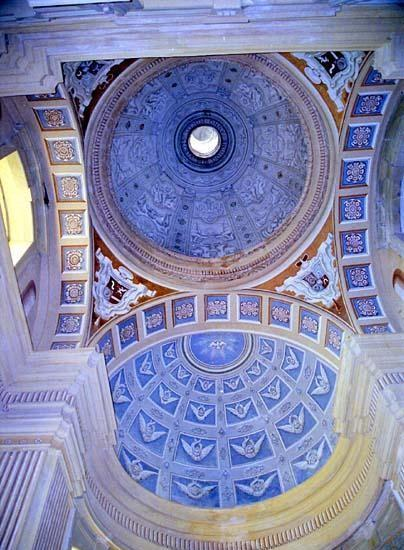
Castle chapel

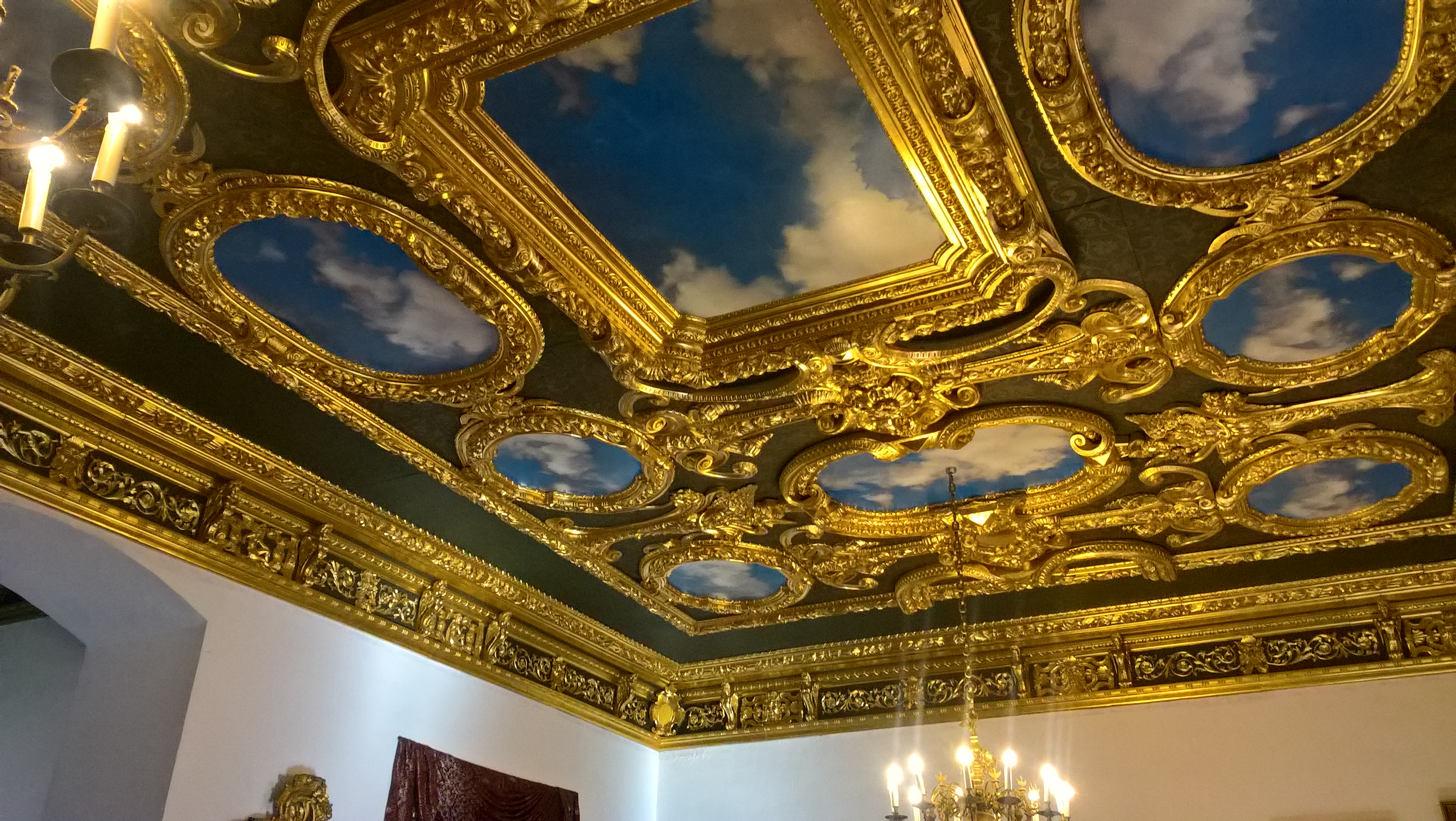
Interior

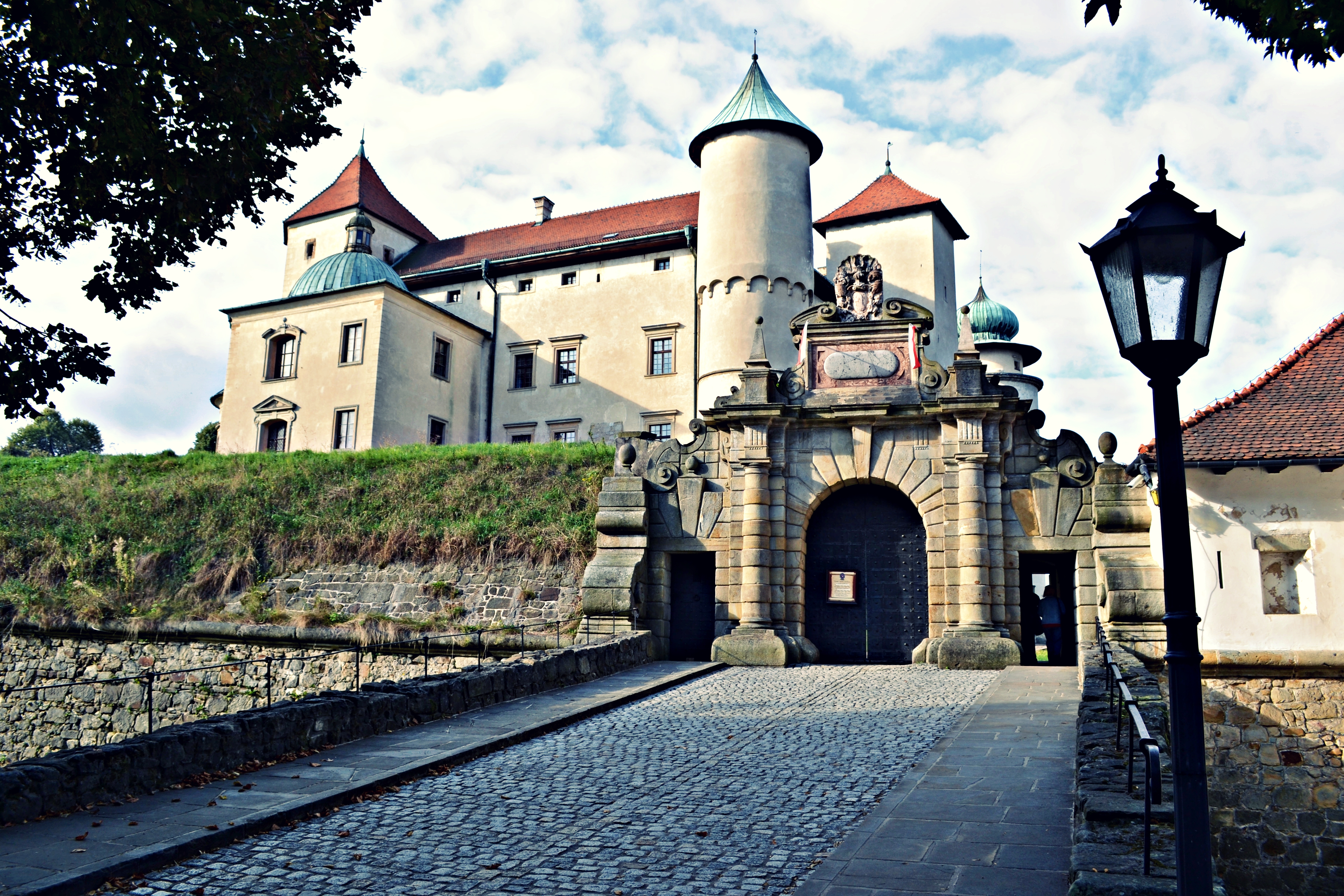
Gate to the castle

== See also ==
- Castles in Poland

== Bibliography ==
- Marek Żukow-Karczewski, Bastionowy zamek Kmitów i Lubomirskich w Wiśniczu Nowym / The castle of Kmita and Lubomirski families at Wiśnicz Nowy, "Aura" 2, 1991, p. 18-20. (in Polish and English)
