= Kobyle =

Kobyle may refer to the following places:

- Kobyle, Lesser Poland Voivodeship (south Poland)
- Kobyle, Lublin Voivodeship (east Poland)
- Kobyle, Subcarpathian Voivodeship (south-east Poland)
- Kobyle, Pomeranian Voivodeship (north Poland)
