= Kazimierz Brodziński =

Polish poet (1791–1835)

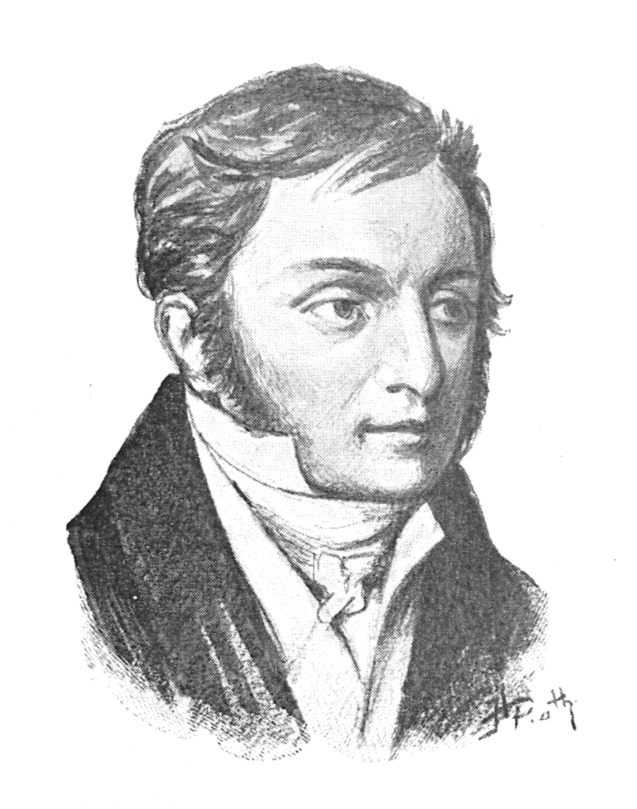
- Born: 8 March 1791; Królówka, Galicia, Habsburg monarchy (now Poland)
- Died: 10 October 1835 (aged 44); Dresden, Kingdom of Saxony (now Germany)
- Occupation: poet
- Writing career
- Period: Sentimentalism; Romanticism
- Notable work: Wiesław

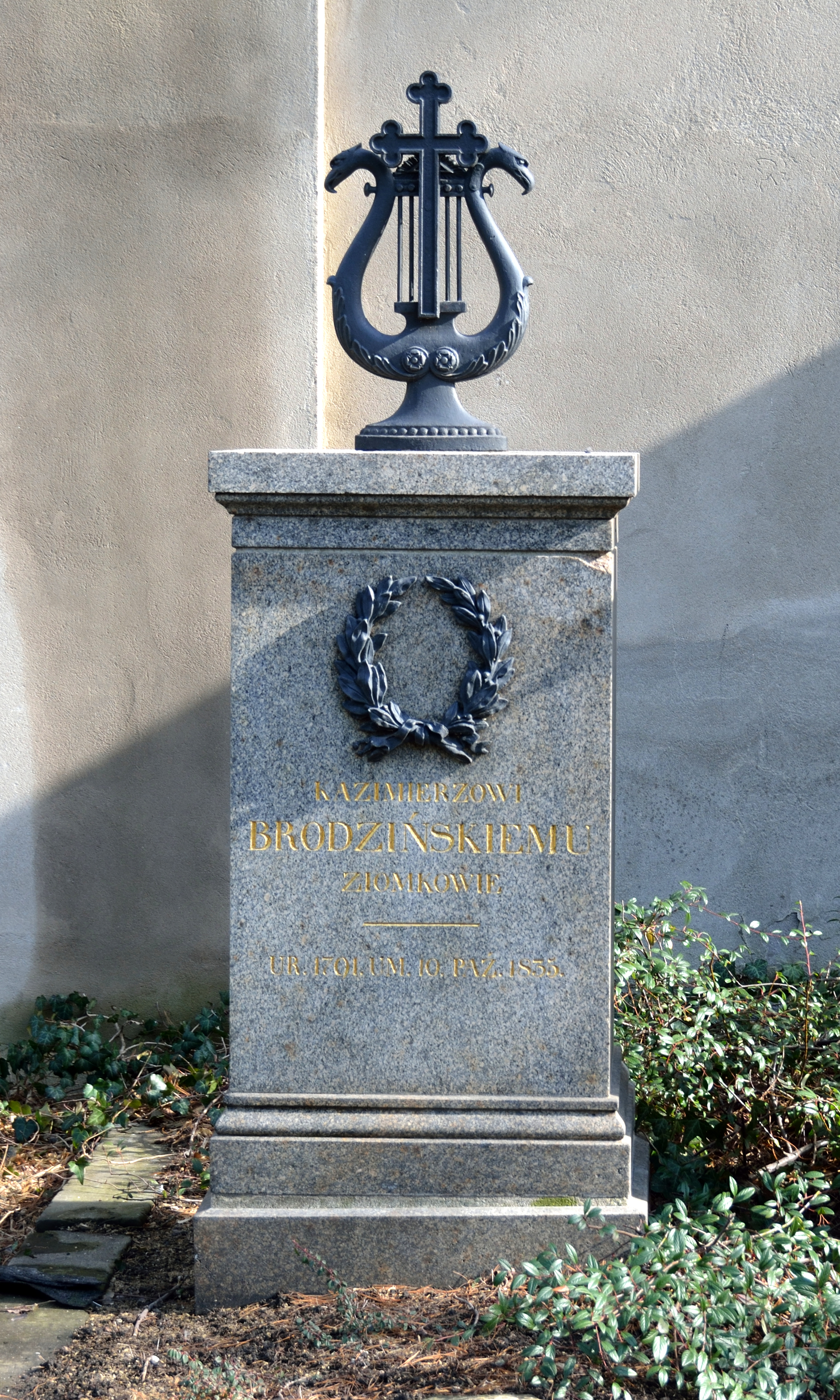
His tombstone at the Old Catholic Cemetery, Dresden

Kazimierz Brodziński (8 March 1791 in Królówka – 10 October 1835 in Dresden) was an important Polish Romantic poet.

== Life ==
He was born in Królówka near Bochnia. He came from the low nobility. He was a student at schools in Tarnów, where he also graduated from the grammar school. He served in the army of the Duchy of Warsaw. He took part in the campaign of 1812, during which he was promoted to the rank of lieutenant. During the Battle of the Nations at Leipzig, he was wounded and taken prisoner by the Prussians. Having returned from captivity in 1814, he settled in Warsaw, where he worked as a clerk. He joined the freemasons, advanced to the fifth degree of initiation; in 1819 he became the secretary of the Great East. From 1818, he was a teacher of Polish literature and of style in schools of various degrees. He also co-operated with Pamiętnik Warszawski, initially as a member of the editorial staff and later as co-editor. In 1823 he became a member of the Society of the Friends of the Sciences. Having received his doctor's degree in philosophy, he was appointed Professor at Warsaw University. He travelled to Prague, Germany, Italy, Switzerland and France. These journeys, made in order to improve his health, became an opportunity to make the acquaintance of Czech researchers into Slavic studies and Czech and Slovak folklore: Josef Jungmann, Václav Hanka and Ján Kollár. During the November Uprising, he was an editor of insurgent newspapers: Kurier Polski and Nowa Polska. Appointed a general inspector of schools by the insurgent authorities, he worked upon the reorganisation of education. After the collapse of the uprising he was dismissed from his posts. He stayed in Kraków for some time. In 1834 he returned to Warsaw, where he edited Jutrzenka and Magazyn Powszechny. In May 1835 he left for treatment to Carlsbad. On his way back he died in Dresden on 10 October 1835.

== Work ==
Brodziński's knowledge of the German language, obtained at school, led to his very early interest in German literature. He read S. Gessner's pastorals, the works of Schiller and Goethe. Brodziński was, above all, a writer of elegies and pastorals. In his pastorals he aimed at giving a modern form to this ancient genre. He searched for inspiration in Old Polish pastorals, in Reklewski's poetry, in the theoretical essays of Herder, Jean Paul and Schiller. He included his thoughts on pastoral in his aesthetic essays: O klasyczności i romantyczności tudzież o duchu poezji polskiej (1818) and O idylli pod względem moralnym (1823).

The pastoral Wiesław gained him universal approval. Its first version appeared in the volumes 16 and 18 of Pamiętnik Warszawski from 1820. It was a pastoral picture spun around the love story of Wiesław and Halina. Yet it was not about the vicissitudes of the lovers. In his pastoral, Brodziński describes the world of harmony between virtuous people and nature. The source of virtue was work on the land, a close relationship with the earth. The poet emphasised the originality of the world in Wiesław by reaching for folklore. Adam Mickiewicz, in the Epilogue of Pan Tadeusz, mentions the popularity of Brodziński's work among contemporary readers. Wiesław was translated into Bulgarian, Czech, German and Russian.

Brodziński wrote the libretto for Karol Kurpiński's 1820 opera Kalmora.
