= Muchówka, Lesser Poland Voivodeship =

Muchówka
- Village
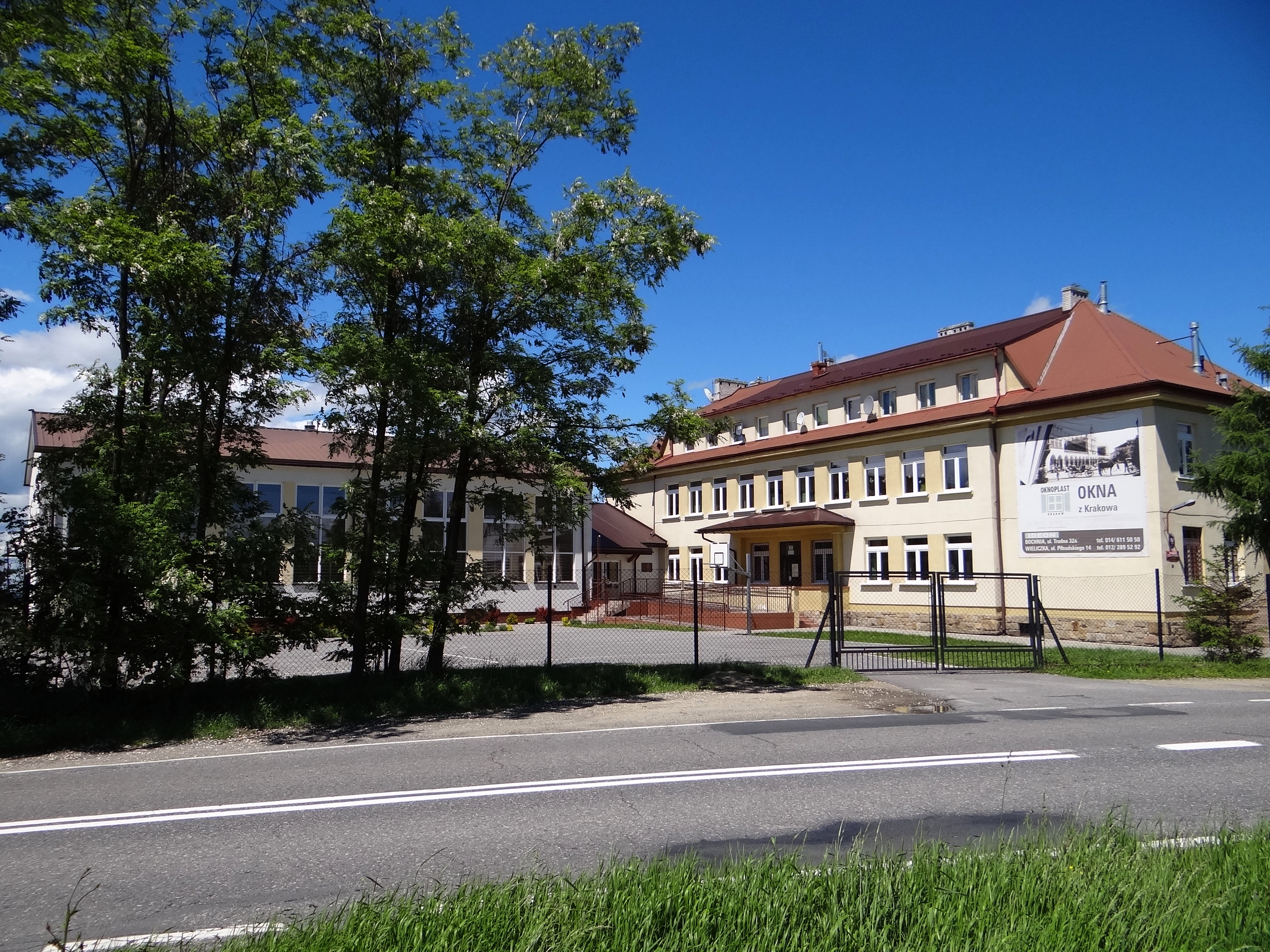
- School

- Location within Poland
- Coordinates: 49°51′N 20°27′E
- Country: Poland
- Voivodeship: Lesser Poland
- County: Bochnia
- Gmina: Nowy Wiśnicz
- Elevation: 380 m (1,250 ft)
- Population: 1,000

Muchówka [muˈxufka] is a village in the administrative district of Gmina Nowy Wiśnicz, within Bochnia County, Lesser Poland Voivodeship, in southern Poland.
