= Leksandrowa =

- Village
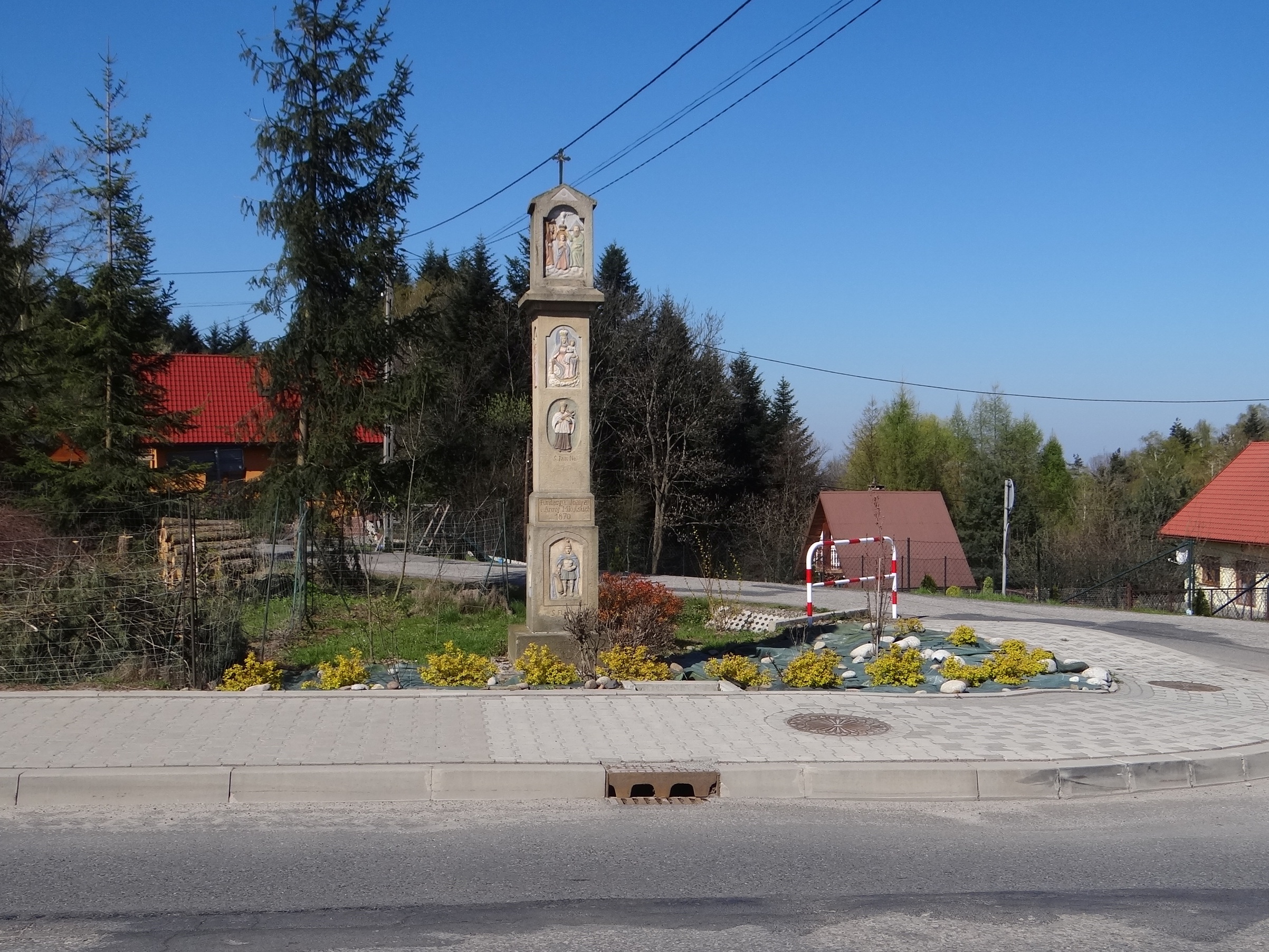
- Wayside cross

- Location within Poland
- Coordinates: 49°54′N 20°28′E
- Country: Poland
- Voivodeship: Lesser Poland
- County: Bochnia
- Gmina: Nowy Wiśnicz

Leksandrowa [lɛksanˈdrɔva] is a village in the administrative district of Gmina Nowy Wiśnicz, within Bochnia County, Lesser Poland Voivodeship, in southern Poland.
