= Olchawa =

- Village
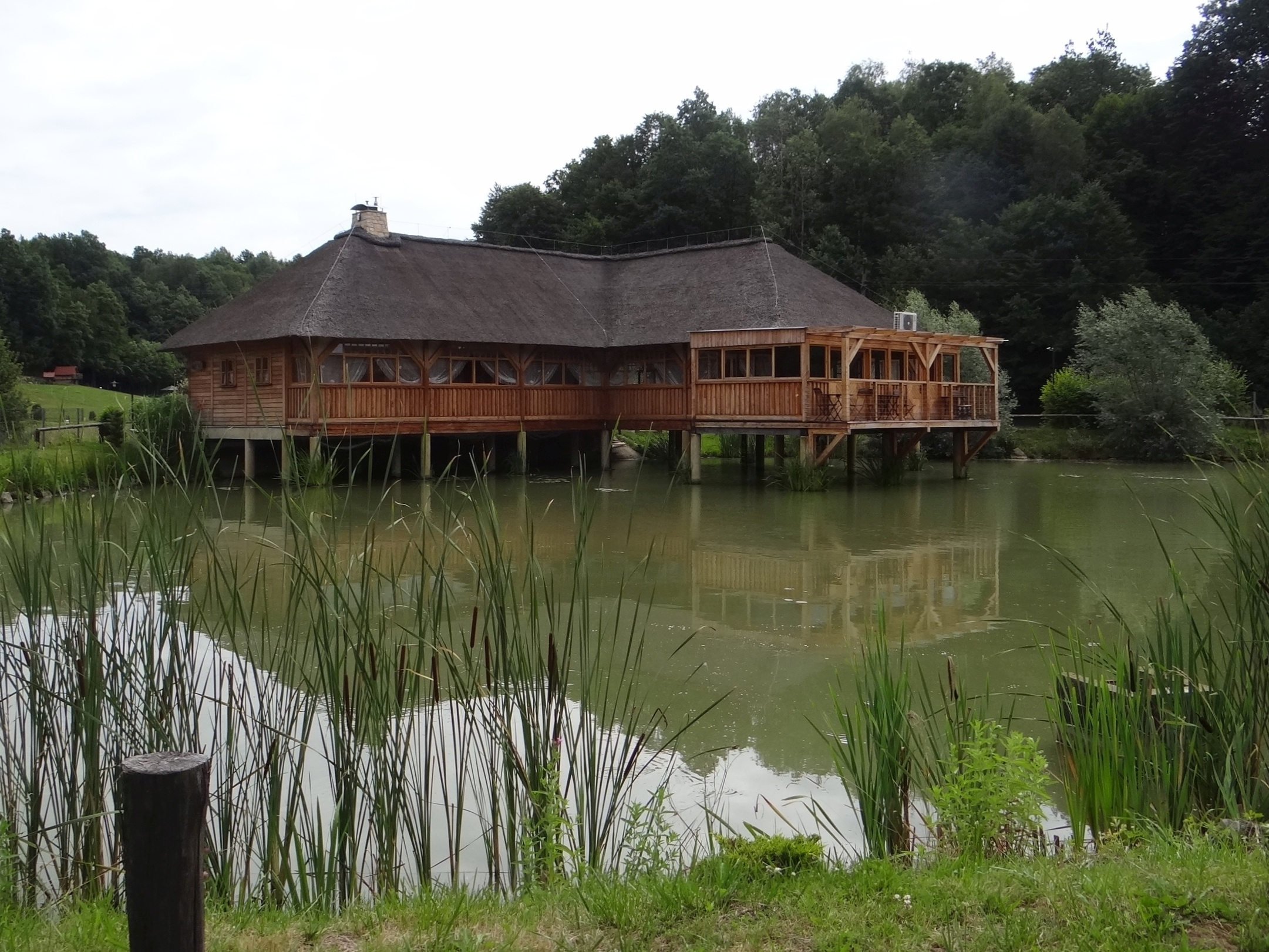
- House by the pond in Olchawa

- Location within Poland
- Coordinates: 49°55′01″N 20°26′12″E
- Country: Poland
- Voivodeship: Lesser Poland
- County: Bochnia
- Gmina: Nowy Wiśnicz

Olchawa [ɔlˈxava] is a village in the administrative district of Gmina Nowy Wiśnicz, within Bochnia County, Lesser Poland Voivodeship, in southern Poland.
