= Połom Duży =

- Village
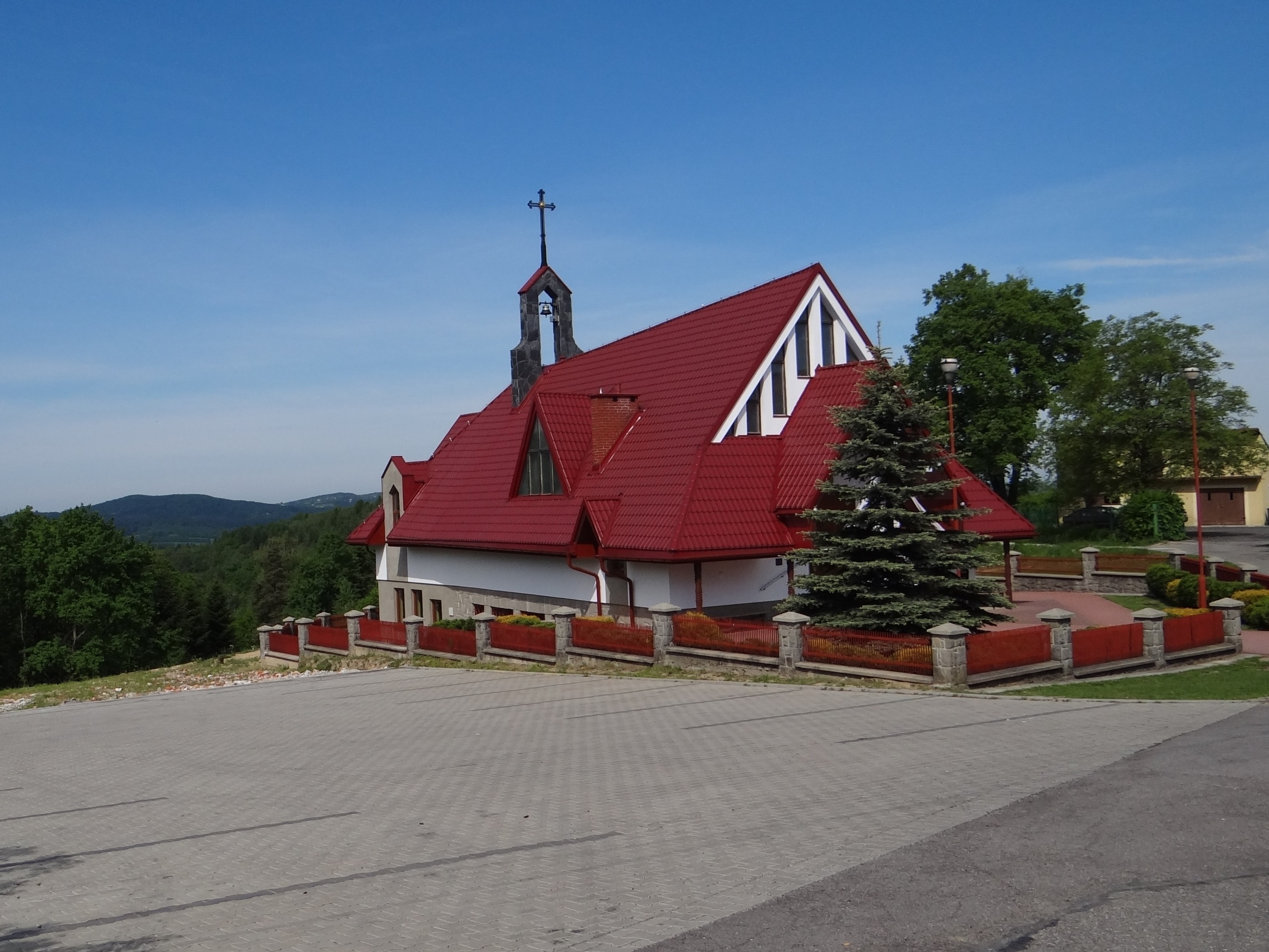
- Catholic church

- Location within Poland
- Coordinates: 49°53′N 20°28′E
- Country: Poland
- Voivodeship: Lesser Poland
- County: Bochnia
- Gmina: Nowy Wiśnicz

Połom Duży [ˈpɔwɔm ˈduʐɨ] is a village in the administrative district of Gmina Nowy Wiśnicz, within Bochnia County, Lesser Poland Voivodeship, in southern Poland.
