= Kalmora =

Kalmora, or The Paternal Right of the Americans (Polish: Kalmora, czyli prawo ojcowskie Amerykanów) is a Polish-language opera (melodrama) in 2 acts by Karol Kurpiński. The libretto was written by Kazimierz Brodziński. Its first performance took place on 10 March 1820.

The complete score of the overture was published by Breitkopf & Härtel in Leipzig in 1825 or 1826 as Kurpiński's Opus 14. The complete score of the whole opera (or at least some parts) is located in the library of the Warsaw Music Society Stanisław Moniuszko.
