= Chronów, Lesser Poland Voivodeship =

Chronów
- Village
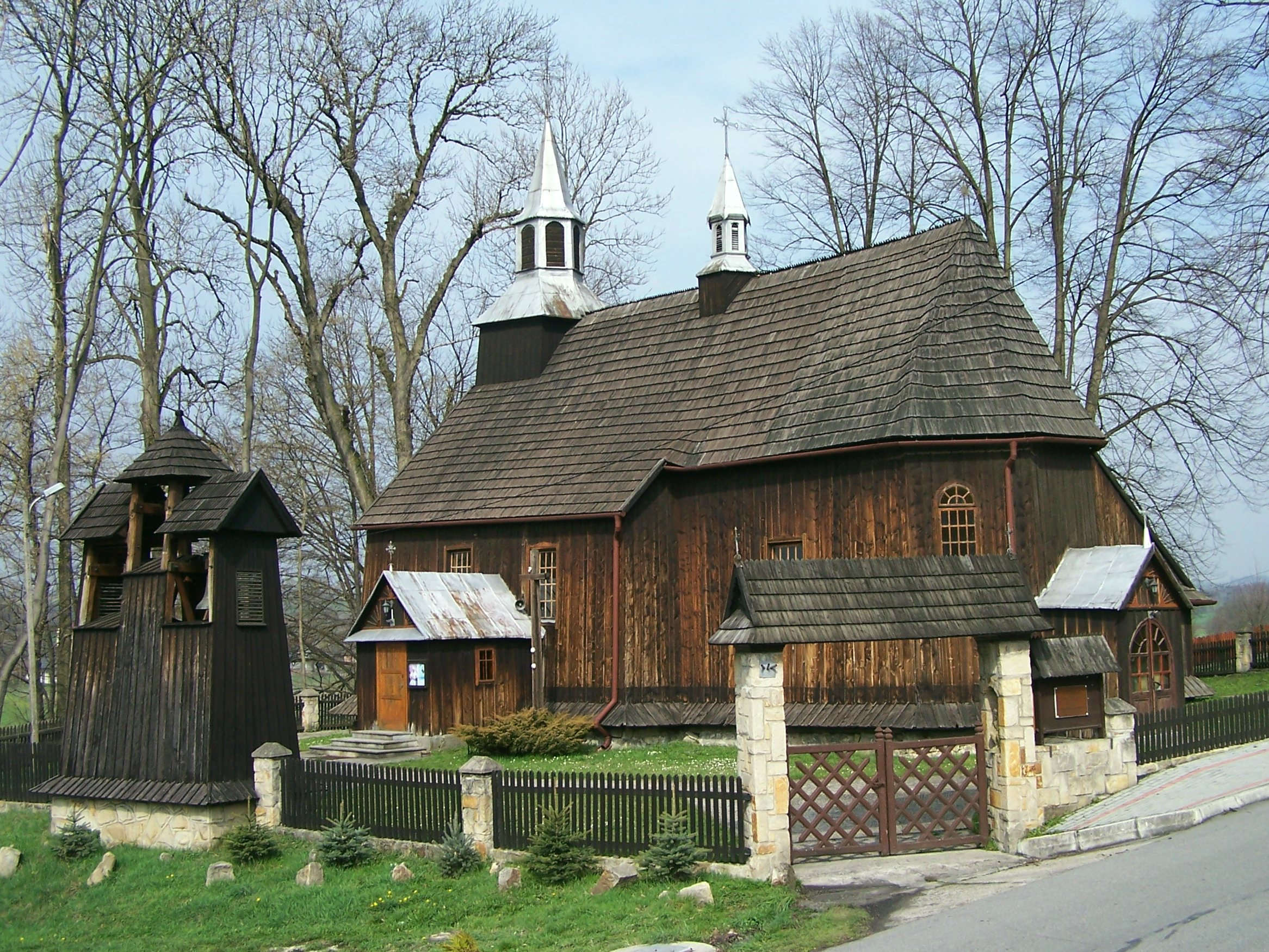
- Church of the Holy Spirit

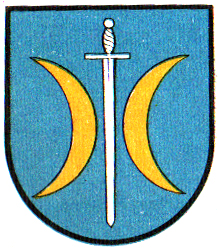
- Coat of arms

- Location within Poland
- Coordinates: 49°55′N 20°33′E
- Country: Poland
- Voivodeship: Lesser Poland
- County: Bochnia
- Gmina: Nowy Wiśnicz

Chronów [ˈxrɔnuf] is a village in the administrative district of Gmina Nowy Wiśnicz, within Bochnia County, Lesser Poland Voivodeship, in southern Poland.
