= Wiśnicz Mały =

- Village
- Location within Poland
- Coordinates: 49°57′N 20°29′E
- Country: Poland
- Voivodeship: Lesser Poland
- County: Bochnia
- Gmina: Nowy Wiśnicz

Wiśnicz Mały (Polish pronunciation: [ˈviɕnit͡ʂ ˈmawɨ]) is a village in the administrative district of Gmina Nowy Wiśnicz, within Bochnia County, Lesser Poland Voivodeship, in southern Poland.
