= Gmina Lipnica Murowana =

Gmina Lipnica Murowana Lipnica Murowana Commune
- Gmina
- Coat of arms
- Interactive map of Gmina Lipnica Murowana
- Coordinates (Lipnica Murowana): 49°51′28″N 20°31′45″E
- Country: Poland
- Voivodeship: Lesser Poland
- County: Bochnia
- Seat: Lipnica Murowana

Area
  - Total: 60.62 km^{2} (23.41 sq mi)

Population (2006)
  - Total: 5,480
  - Density: 90.4/km^{2} (234/sq mi)
- Website: https://www.lipniczanin.pl/

Gmina Lipnica Murowana is a rural gmina (administrative district) in Bochnia County, Lesser Poland Voivodeship, in southern Poland. Its seat is the village of Lipnica Murowana, which lies approximately 16 kilometres (10 mi) south-east of Bochnia and 48 km (30 mi) south-east of the regional capital Kraków.

The gmina covers an area of 60.62 square kilometres (23.4 sq mi), and as of 2006 its total population is 5,480.

The gmina contains part of the protected area called Wiśnicz-Lipnica Landscape Park.

== Villages ==
Gmina Lipnica Murowana contains the villages and settlements of Borówna, Lipnica Dolna, Lipnica Górna, Lipnica Murowana and Rajbrot.

== Neighbouring gminas ==
Gmina Lipnica Murowana is bordered by the gminas of Czchów, Gnojnik, Iwkowa, Laskowa, Nowy Wiśnicz and Żegocina.
