= Wiśnicz-Lipnica Landscape Park =

Protected area in Poland

Coordinates: 49.8864°N 20.4778°E

- Wiśnicko-Lipnicki Park Krajobrazowy
- IUCN category V (protected landscape/seascape)
- Interactive map of Wiśnicz-Lipnica Landscape Park
- Location: Lesser Poland Voivodeship
- Area: 143.11 km^{2} (55.26 sq mi)
- Established: 1997

Wiśnicz-Lipnica Landscape Park (Wiśnicko-Lipnicki Park Krajobrazowy) is a protected area (Landscape Park) in southern Poland, established in 1997, covering an area of 143.11 square kilometres (55.26 sq mi).

The Park lies within Lesser Poland Voivodeship, in Bochnia County (Gmina Lipnica Murowana, Gmina Nowy Wiśnicz).

Within the Landscape Park are three nature reserves.

== Plants and fungi ==
The vascular flora of the Wiśnicko-Lipnicki Landscape Park has 671 species, while the bryophyte flora has 122 species. Of the more interesting species, the following are found: green hellebore, stemless thistle, cruciferous gentian, periwinkle gentian, golden lily, white coltsfoot, wolfsbane, broad-leaved and spotted cuckoo, common larvae, bog gnat. On shady places in the forest one can find ostrich plume fern, giant horsetail, forest scabious, lily of the valley of the valley. A total of 51 protected species of vascular plants and 24 species of protected bryophytes were found.

A forest nature reserve of Bukowiec was established on the top of Bukowiec, where flowering specimens of common ivy can be found among the well-preserved stand of trees. The park has been shown to contain 187 different taxa of fungi. Rare species found here include: poplar caterpillars, green-blue coot, curly-leaved foldwort, pine bole, tubular scabious, and sitka bun. 136 species of lichens have also been recorded here, the most interesting of which are: rough crush, variegated ribwort, literacium proper, goldenseal.
