= Borówna =

- Village
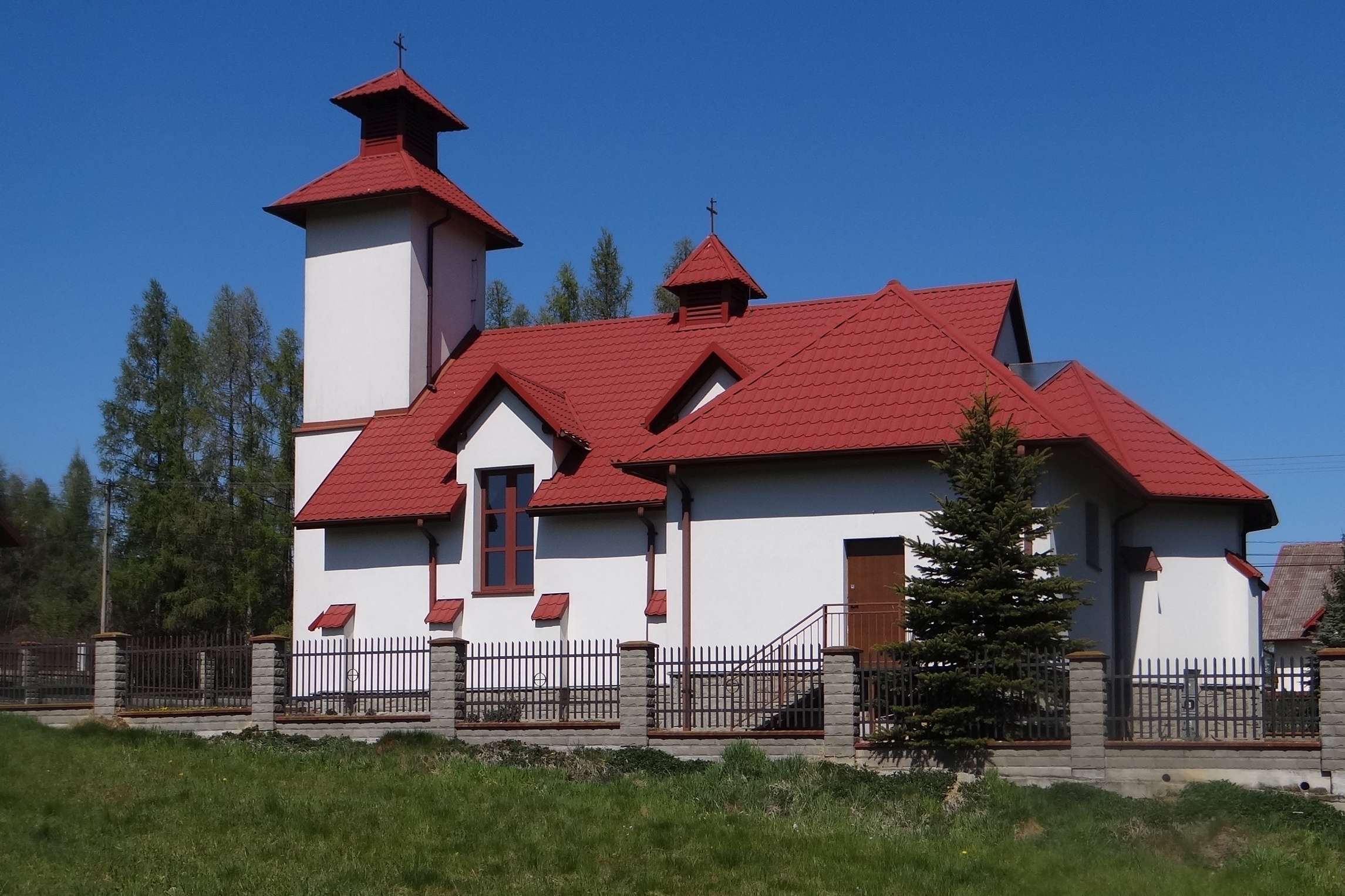
- Church in Borówna

- Location within Poland
- Coordinates: 49°53′18″N 20°30′53″E
- Country: Poland
- Voivodeship: Lesser Poland
- County: Bochnia
- Gmina: Lipnica Murowana

Borówna [bɔˈruvna] is a village in the administrative district of Gmina Lipnica Murowana, within Bochnia County, Lesser Poland Voivodeship, in southern Poland.
