= Rajbrot =

- Village
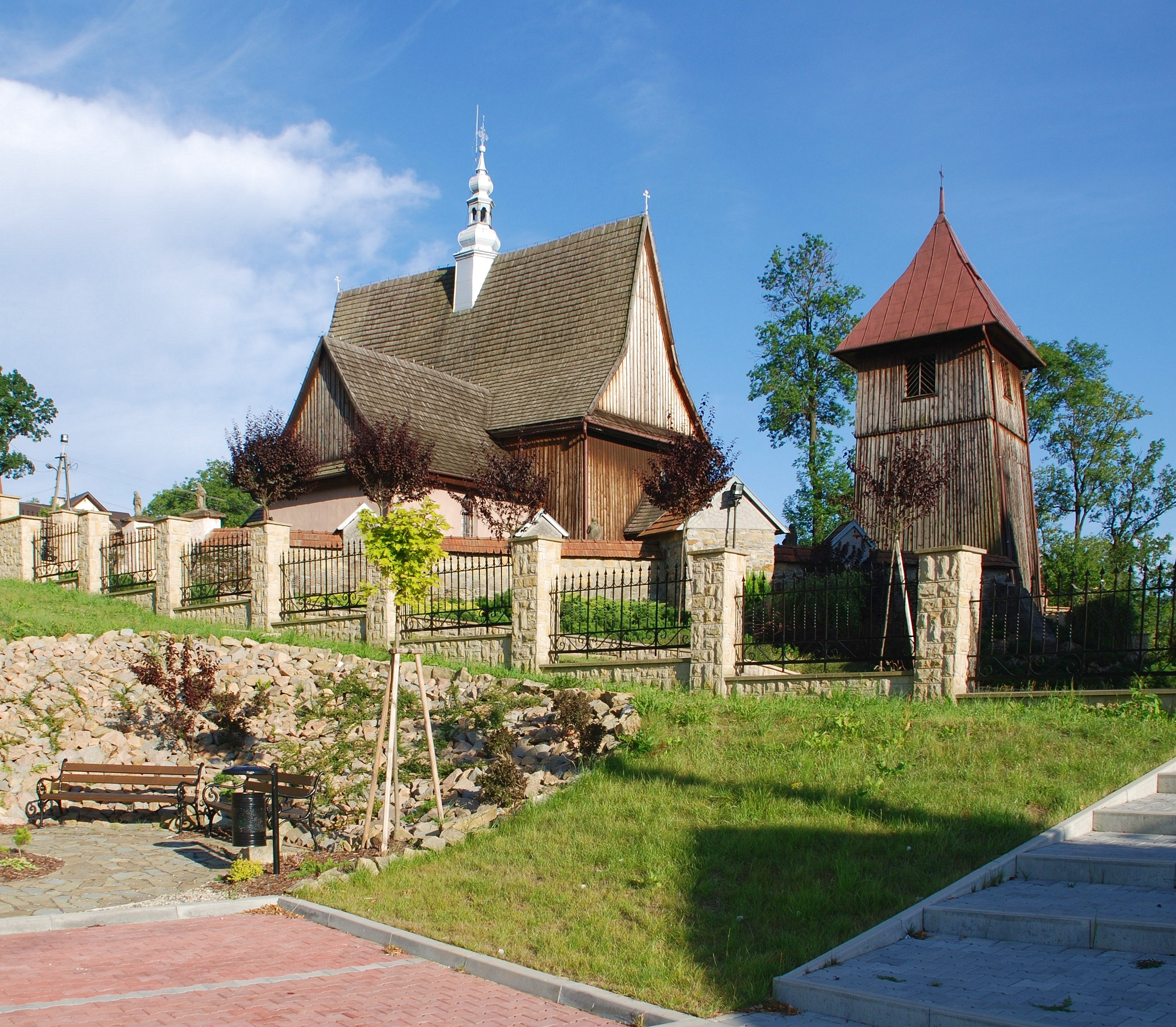
- Church of the Nativity of the Virgin Mary

- Location within Poland
- Coordinates: 49°50′N 20°29′E
- Country: Poland
- Voivodeship: Lesser Poland
- County: Bochnia
- Gmina: Lipnica Murowana

Population
  - Total: 2,320
- Website: www.rajbrot.ovh.org

Rajbrot [ˈrai̯brɔt] is a village in the administrative district of Gmina Lipnica Murowana, within Bochnia County, Lesser Poland Voivodeship, in southern Poland.
