= Maciej Trapola =

Italian architect

- Born: Italy
- Died: 1637; Nowy Wiśnicz, Poland
- Occupation: Architect
- Era: Baroque, Mannerism
- Notable work: Urban planning of Nowy Wiśnicz
- Projects: Castle of Nowy Wiśnicz, Assumption of the Blessed Virgin Mary Catholic Church, Discalced Carmelite Monastery (destroyed 1939), Town Hall in Nowy Wiśnicz (1616–1620), Parish Church in Nowy Wiśnicz (1616–1621)

Maciej Trapola (?–1637) was an Italian architect who worked as the court architect under Stanislaw Lubomirski in Poland during the Baroque era.

== Biography ==
Maciej Trapola was an Italian architect working primarily in Poland in the early 17th century. Trapola's architectural style was Baroque with characteristics of Mannerism. Most, if not all of Trapola's structures were built in the Polish town of Nowy Wisnicz for then owner Stanislaw Lubomirski. Lubomirski was a Polish general who had inherited ownership of the town from his father. During the time of Lubomirskis ownership he ordered Trapola to build several structures as well as fortifications for existing structures. Trapola is also credited with the urban planning of Nowy Wisnicz into its current grid layout. The main focal points of the grid layout are the Town Square and Town Hall.

== Legacy ==
Some of Trapola's work can still be seen in the small Polish region of Nowy Wisnicz. The Nowy Wisnicz castle continues to sit proudly atop the hill overlooking the small town and featured the fortifications that were added by Trapola around 1615–1621. Another example of Trapola's work in Nowy Wisnicz is the Assumption of the Blessed Virgin Mary Catholic Church. This church is still actively used to this day.

=== Home & studio ===
Maciej Trapola's home, from 1622 to 1637, can still be visited today in the center of Nowy Wisnicz, Poland. The building underwent extensive renovations in 1998, and a plaque was added to the outside of the building commemorating the Architect. The plaque was added by Professor Czesław Dźwigaj, and it reads "In this house from 1622 to death in 1637 lived and created Maciej Trapola an outstanding Italian architect, builder of the castle, parish church, town hall and Carmelite monastery, author of the first measurements and urban-spatial assumptions of the city of Nowy Wiśnicz."

== Works ==
- Castle of Nowy Wisnicz
- Assumption of the Blessed Virgin Mary Catholic Church
- Discalced Carmelite Monastery (destroyed 1939)
- Ruins located south of the Castle if Nowy Wisnicz
- Town Hall in Nowy Wisnicz (1616–1620)
- Parish Church in Nowy Wisnicz (1616–1621)

== Gallery ==
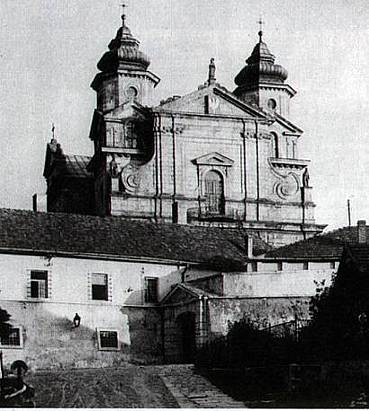
Discalced Carmelite Church, Nowy Wisnicz

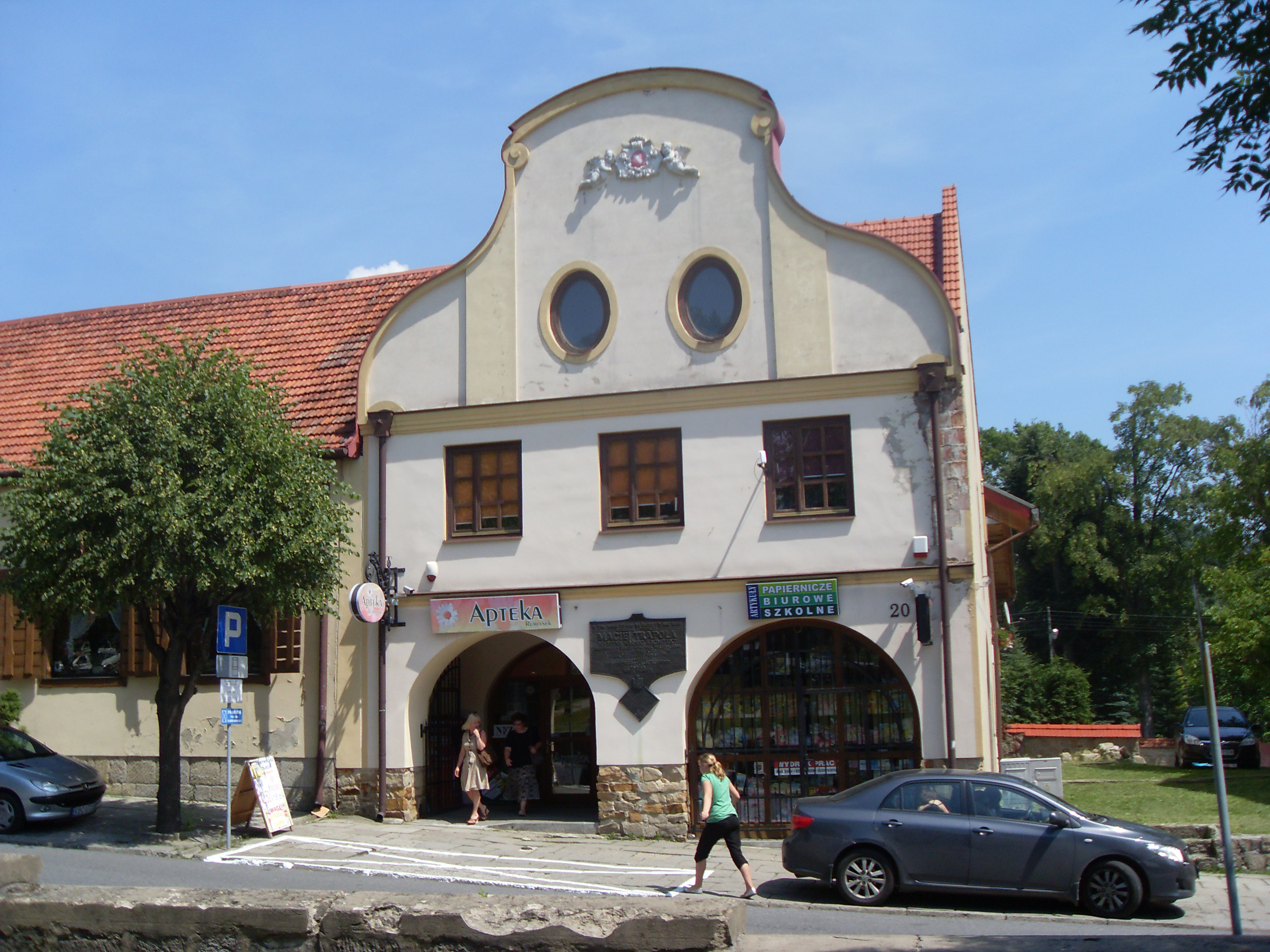
Home of Maciej Trapola during his time as Court Architect under Lubomirski

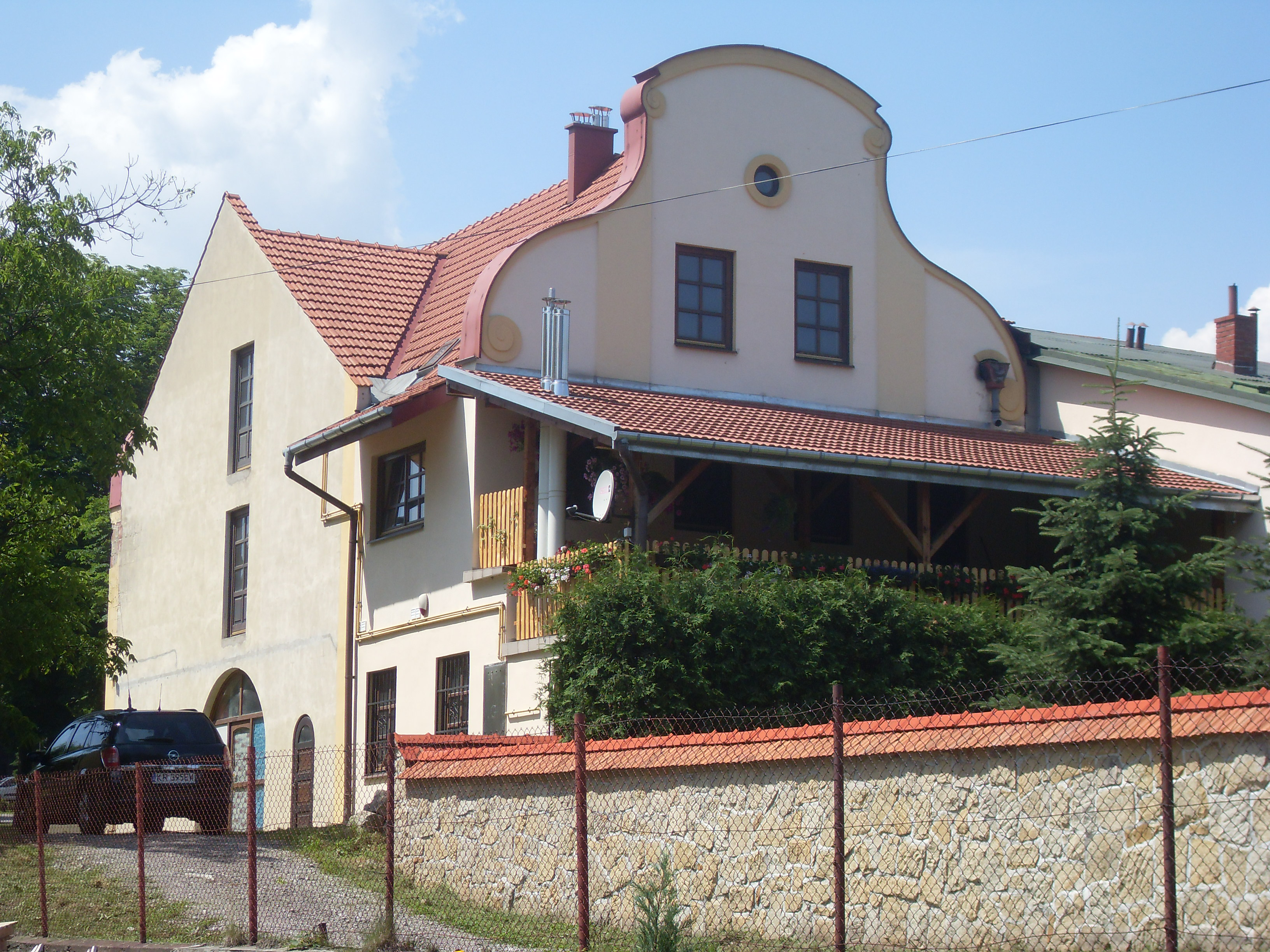
Rear view of Trapola's home

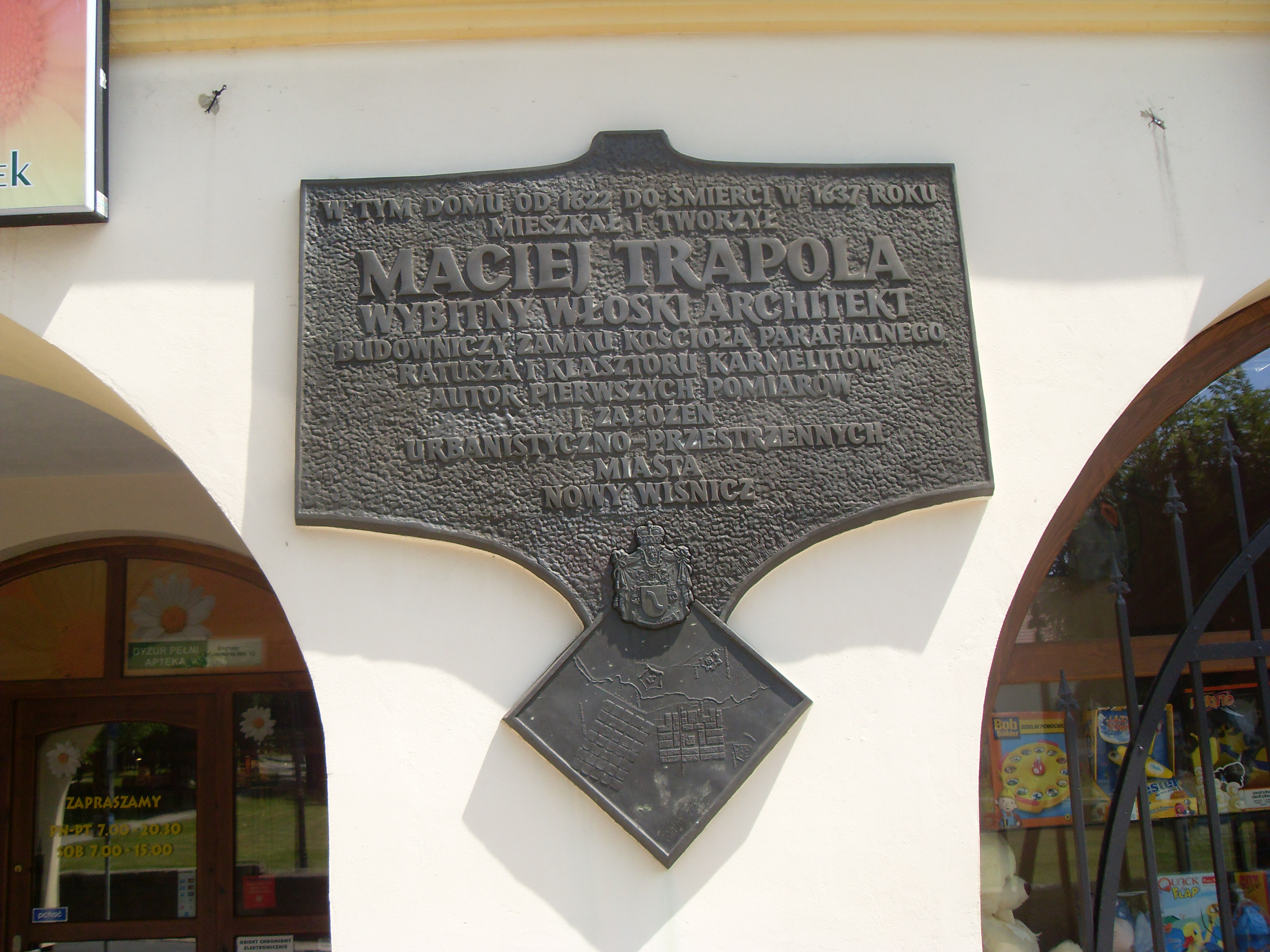
Plaque on outside of Trapola's home commemorating the architect
