= Gmina Nowy Wiśnicz =

Gmina Nowy Wiśnicz Nowy Wiśnicz Commune
- Gmina
- Coat of arms
- Interactive map of Gmina Nowy Wiśnicz
- Coordinates (Nowy Wiśnicz): 49°55′N 20°27′E
- Country: Poland
- Voivodeship: Lesser Poland
- County: Bochnia
- Seat: Nowy Wiśnicz

Area
  - Total: 82.49 km^{2} (31.85 sq mi)

Population (2006)
  - Total: 12,895
  - Density: 156.3/km^{2} (404.9/sq mi)
  - Urban: 2,716
  - Rural: 10,179
- Website: http://umwisnicz.home.pl/

Gmina Nowy Wiśnicz is an urban-rural gmina (administrative district) in Bochnia County, Lesser Poland Voivodeship, in southern Poland. Its seat is the town of Nowy Wiśnicz, which lies approximately 8 kilometres (5 mi) south of Bochnia and 40 km (25 mi) south-east of the regional capital Kraków.

The gmina covers an area of 82.49 square kilometres (31.8 sq mi), and as of 2006 its total population is 12,895 (out of which the population of Nowy Wiśnicz amounts to 2,716, and the population of the rural part of the gmina is 10,179).

The gmina contains part of the protected area called Wiśnicz-Lipnica Landscape Park.

== Villages ==
Apart from the town of Nowy Wiśnicz, Gmina Nowy Wiśnicz contains the villages and settlements of Chronów, Kobyle, Kopaliny, Królówka, Leksandrowa, Łomna, Muchówka, Olchawa, Połom Duży, Stary Wiśnicz and Wiśnicz Mały.

== Neighbouring gminas ==
Gmina Nowy Wiśnicz is bordered by the town of Bochnia and by the gminas of Bochnia, Brzesko, Gnojnik, Lipnica Murowana, Trzciana and Żegocina.
