= Łomna, Lesser Poland Voivodeship =

Łomna
- Village
- Location within Poland
- Coordinates: 49°54′N 20°30′E
- Country: Poland
- Voivodeship: Lesser Poland
- County: Bochnia
- Gmina: Nowy Wiśnicz

Łomna [ˈwɔmna] is a village in the administrative district of Gmina Nowy Wiśnicz, within Bochnia County, Lesser Poland Voivodeship, in southern Poland.
