= Kobyle, Lesser Poland Voivodeship =

Kobyle
- Village
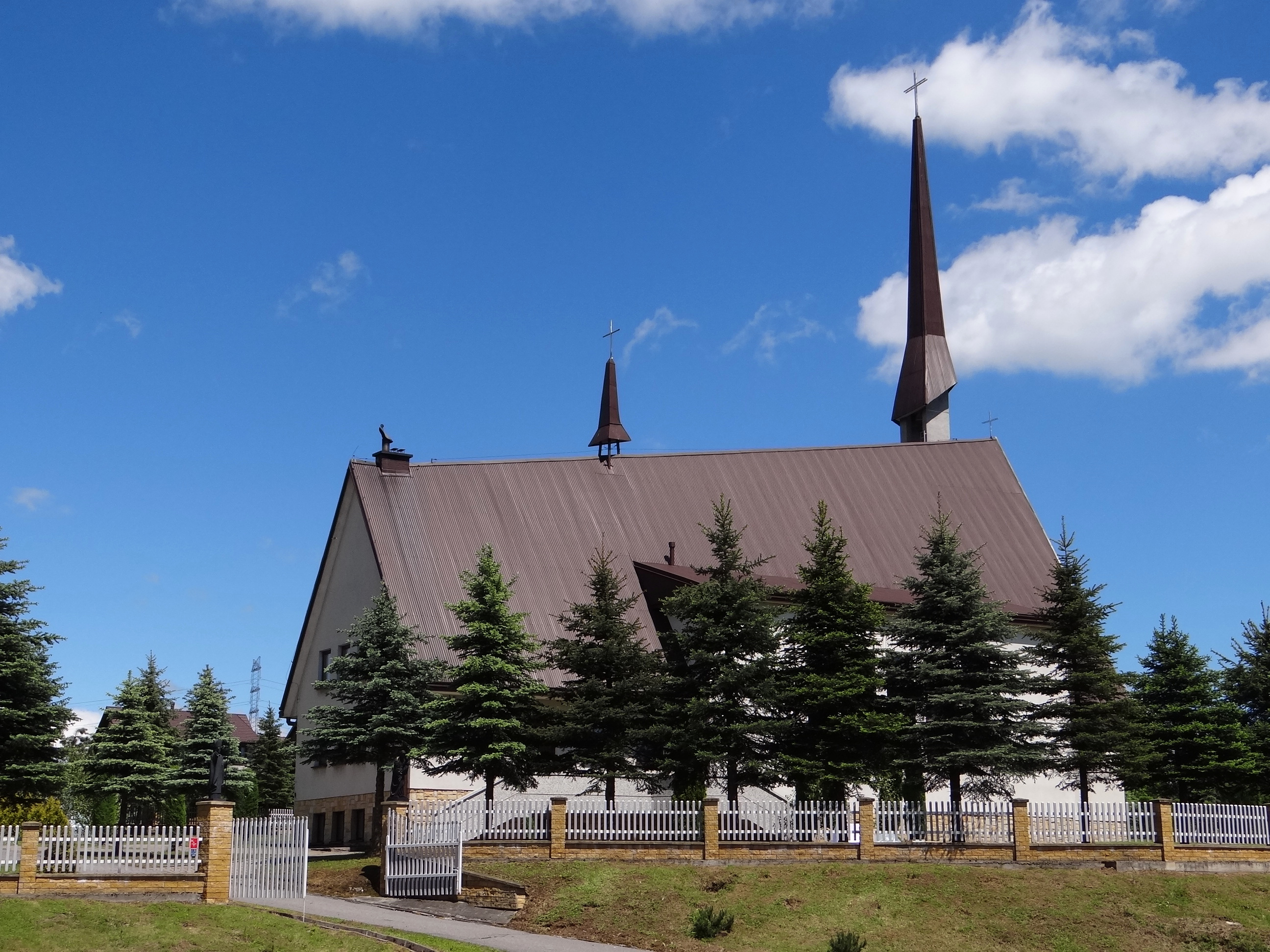
- Catholic church

- Location within Poland
- Coordinates: 49°55′N 20°31′E
- Country: Poland
- Voivodeship: Lesser Poland
- County: Bochnia
- Gmina: Nowy Wiśnicz
- Population: 1,250

Kobyle [kɔˈbɨlɛ] is a village in the administrative district of Gmina Nowy Wiśnicz, within Bochnia County, Lesser Poland Voivodeship, in southern Poland.
