= Lipnica Dolna, Lesser Poland Voivodeship =

Lipnica Dolna
- Village
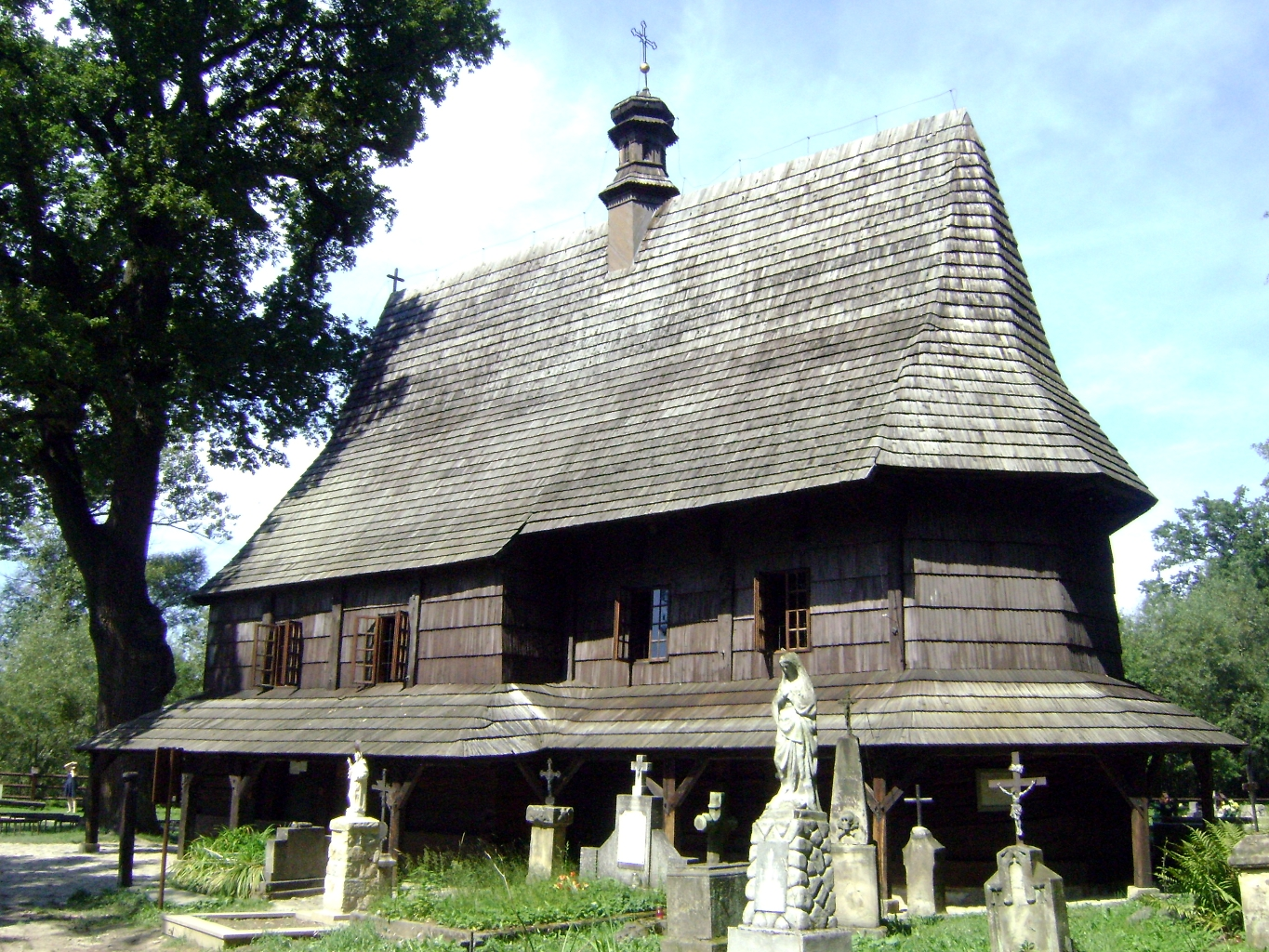
- Church of Saint Leonard

- Location within Poland
- Coordinates: 49°51′28″N 20°33′59″E
- Country: Poland
- Voivodeship: Lesser Poland
- County: Bochnia
- Gmina: Lipnica Murowana

Population
  - Total: 1,100

Lipnica Dolna (Polish pronunciation: [lipˈɲit͡sa ˈdɔlna]) is a village in the administrative district of Gmina Lipnica Murowana, within Bochnia County, Lesser Poland Voivodeship, in southern Poland.

Its main tourist attraction is the St. Leonard Church from 15th century, part of the UNESCO monument, the Wooden churches of Southern Lesser Poland.
