= Stary Wiśnicz =

- Village
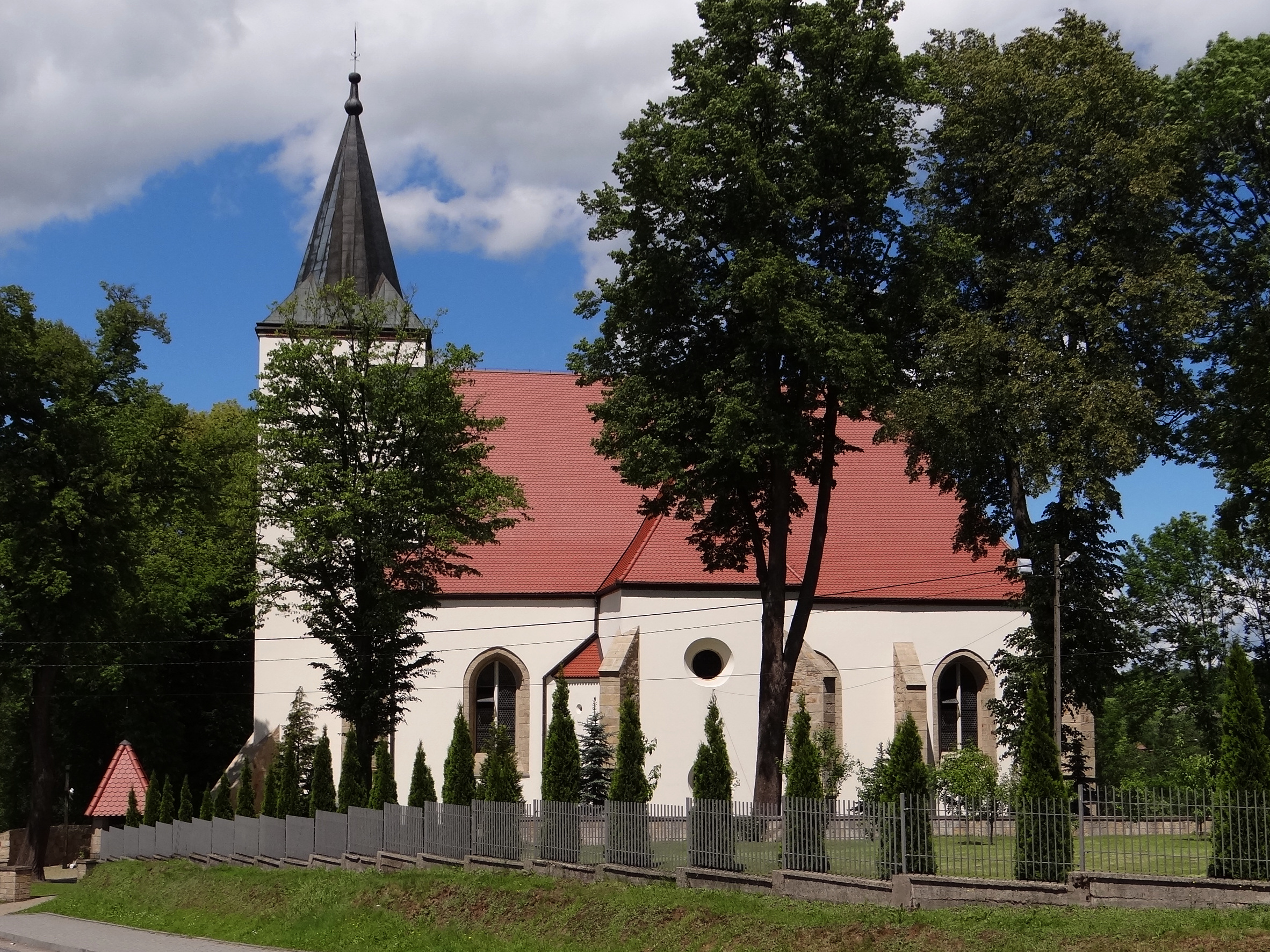
- Church of Saint Adalbert

- Location within Poland
- Coordinates: 49°55′N 20°29′E
- Country: Poland
- Voivodeship: Lesser Poland
- County: Bochnia
- Gmina: Nowy Wiśnicz

Stary Wiśnicz [ˈstarɨ ˈviɕnit͡ʂ] is a village in the administrative district of Gmina Nowy Wiśnicz, within Bochnia County, Lesser Poland Voivodeship, in southern Poland.
