= Lipnica Górna, Lesser Poland Voivodeship =

Lipnica Górna
- Village
- Location within Poland
- Coordinates: 49°52′6″N 20°29′40″E
- Country: Poland
- Voivodeship: Lesser Poland
- County: Bochnia
- Gmina: Lipnica Murowana
- Population: 1,100

Lipnica Górna (Polish pronunciation: [lipˈɲit͡sa ˈɡurna]) is a village in the administrative district of Gmina Lipnica Murowana, within Bochnia County, Lesser Poland Voivodeship, in southern Poland.
