= Droginia =

- Village
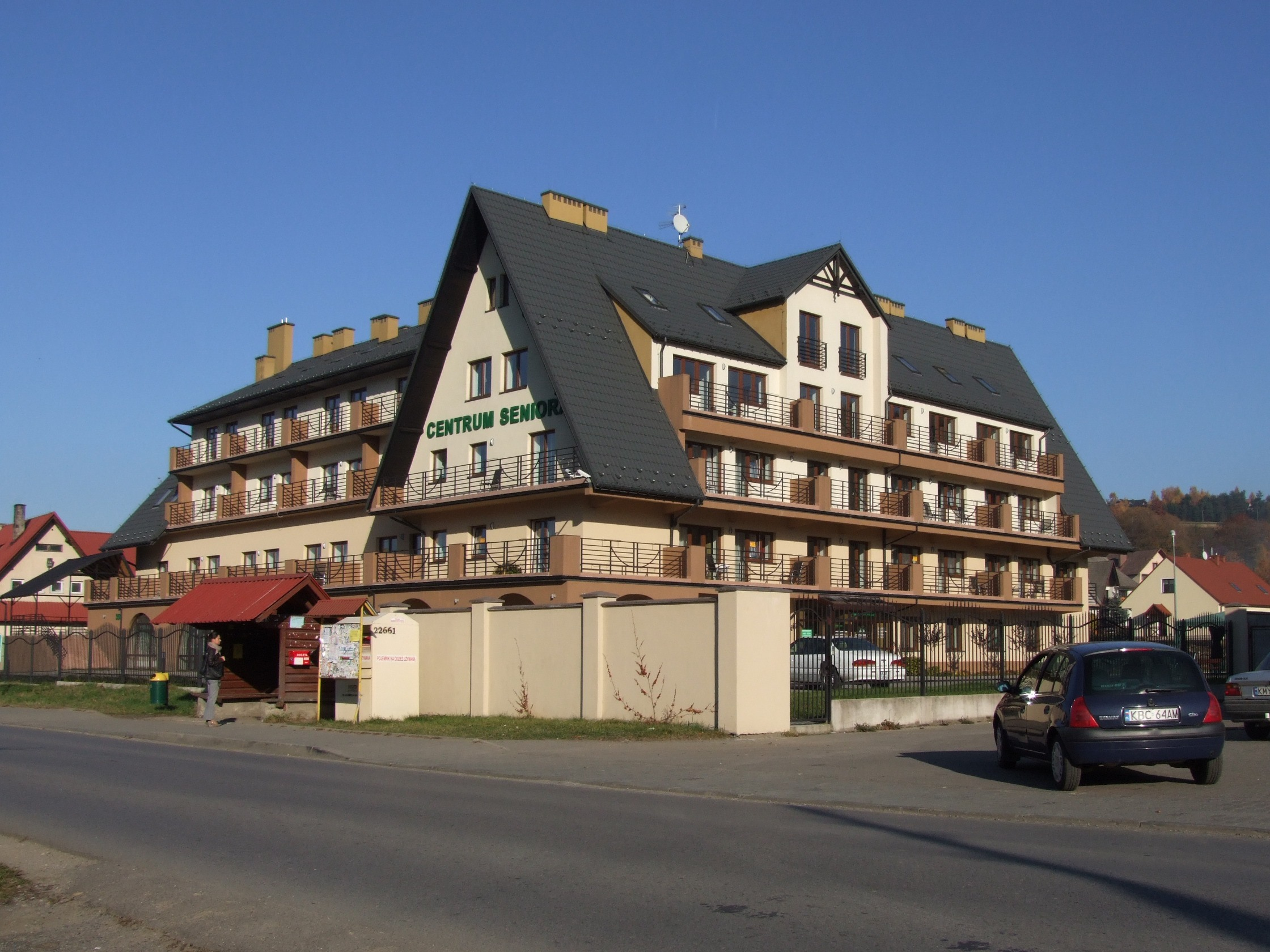

- Location within Poland
- Coordinates: 49°52′N 20°2′E
- Country: Poland
- Voivodeship: Lesser Poland
- County: Myślenice
- Gmina: Myślenice

Droginia [drɔˈɡiɲa] is a village in the administrative district of Gmina Myślenice, within Myślenice County, Lesser Poland Voivodeship, in southern Poland.
