= Kopaliny, Lesser Poland Voivodeship =

Kopaliny
- Village
- Location within Poland
- Coordinates: 49°56′N 20°27′E
- Country: Poland
- Voivodeship: Lesser Poland
- County: Bochnia
- Gmina: Nowy Wiśnicz

Kopaliny [kɔpaˈlinɨ] is a village in the administrative district of Gmina Nowy Wiśnicz, within Bochnia County, Lesser Poland Voivodeship, in southern Poland.
