= Królówka, Lesser Poland Voivodeship =

Królówka
- Village
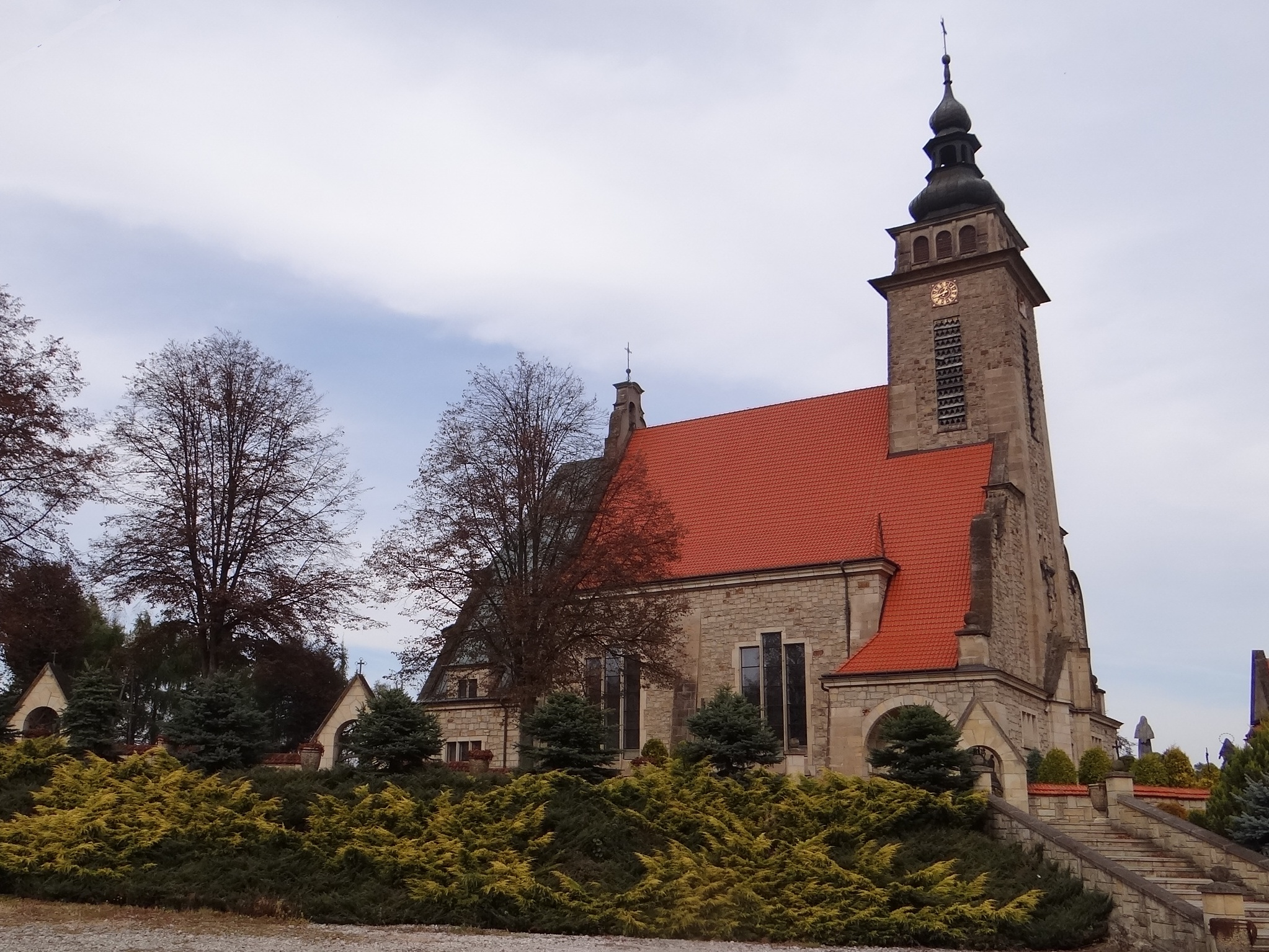
- Church of the Transfiguration of the Lord

- Location within Poland
- Coordinates: 49°53′N 20°25′E
- Country: Poland
- Voivodeship: Lesser Poland
- County: Bochnia
- Gmina: Nowy Wiśnicz

Królówka [kruˈlufka] is a village in the administrative district of Gmina Nowy Wiśnicz, within Bochnia County, Lesser Poland Voivodeship, in southern Poland.
