= Leopold Okulicki =

General of the Polish Army and Home Army member

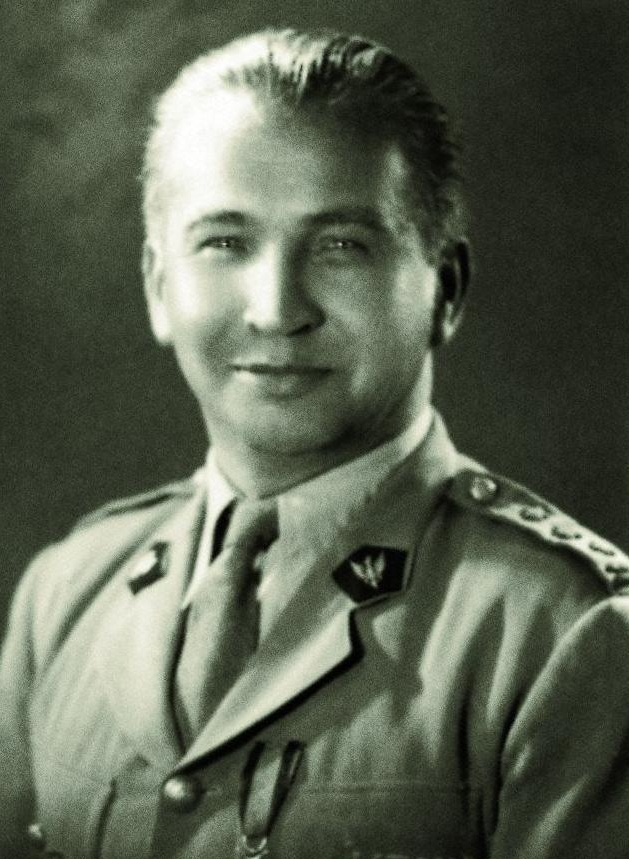
- Okulicki in 1943
- Born: 12 November 1898; Bratucice, Kingdom of Galicia and Lodomeria, Austria-Hungary
- Died: 24 December 1946 (aged 48); Moscow, Russian SFSR, Soviet Union
- Military career
- Nicknames: Kobra, Niedźwiadek
- Awards: Order of Virtuti Militari (Gold Cross); Order of Virtuti Militari (Silver Cross); Cross of Valour (4 times); Cross of Merit with Swords (Gold); Commander of the Legion of Merit (USA)

General Leopold Okulicki (noms de guerre Kobra, Niedźwiadek; 1898 – 1946) was a Polish Army Brigadier General and the last commander of the anti-Nazi underground Home Army during World War II and the German occupation of Poland (1939–1945).

After the war, he was arrested by the Soviet NKVD and died at Butyrka prison in Moscow.

== Life ==
Okulicki was born in November 1898 in Bratucice, Bochnia County in Austro-Hungarian Galicia – modern-day Poland. He was born on November 12, 1898 into the family of farmers Błażej and Anna née Korcyl.

In 1910 he enrolled at a local gymnasium (secondary school), and after 1913 was a member of the Związek Strzelecki (Riflemen's Association). The following year, aged 16, after finishing basic military training, he passed his NCO exams.

After the outbreak of World War I, in October 1915, he left school and volunteered for the Polish Legions, where he served with distinction in the 3rd Legions Infantry Regiment.

He remained in the Polish Army and fought in various units during World War I and the subsequent Polish–Bolshevik War (1919–1921). Okulicki was decorated with the highest Polish military order, the Virtuti Militari.

During the interwar period he remained in the army and in 1925 graduated from the prestigious Warsaw Military Academy. Afterward Okulicki took a post in the Grodno local corps headquarters.

Until the late 1930s, he taught at the Infantry Training Centre in Rembertów, and became commanding officer of Polish 13th Infantry Division.

=== Nazi occupation ===
In 1939, Okulicki was made commander of one of the departments of the Polish Commander-in-Chief's Headquarters.

At the outbreak of World War II and the defense of Poland against Nazi Germany in 1939, Okulicki was in Warsaw. After Edward Rydz-Śmigły evacuated his staff from Warsaw, Okulicki remained in the Polish capital and served in various posts during the Siege of Warsaw.

After the capitulation of the Polish troops defending the capital, Okulicki evaded capture by the Germans and joined Służba Zwycięstwu Polski (en.Service for Poland's Victory), one of the first underground resistance organizations formed in Nazi and Soviet-occupied Poland. This organization later changed its name to the Union of Armed Struggle and then to the Home Army.

In January 1940, he moved to Łódź, where he assumed the post of commander of the local area of that organization. After a brief stint at Headquarters, he was transferred to Soviet-occupied Lwów and became head of that area. General Stefan Rowecki, the commander-in-chief of the ZWZ, appointed Okulicki as the commander of the Soviet occupation in Area No. 2 - Białystok and Area No. 3 - Lwów, with the difficult and dangerous task of eliminating the organizational breakdown in the Lwów Area and putting the affairs of the ZWZ in order throughout the entire occupation.

=== Soviet period ===
Arrested by the NKVD in January 1941, Okulicki was imprisoned and tortured in various Soviet prisons.

Released after the Sikorski-Mayski Agreement of 1941, he joined the Polish Army recreated in the USSR, where he assumed the post of chief of staff.

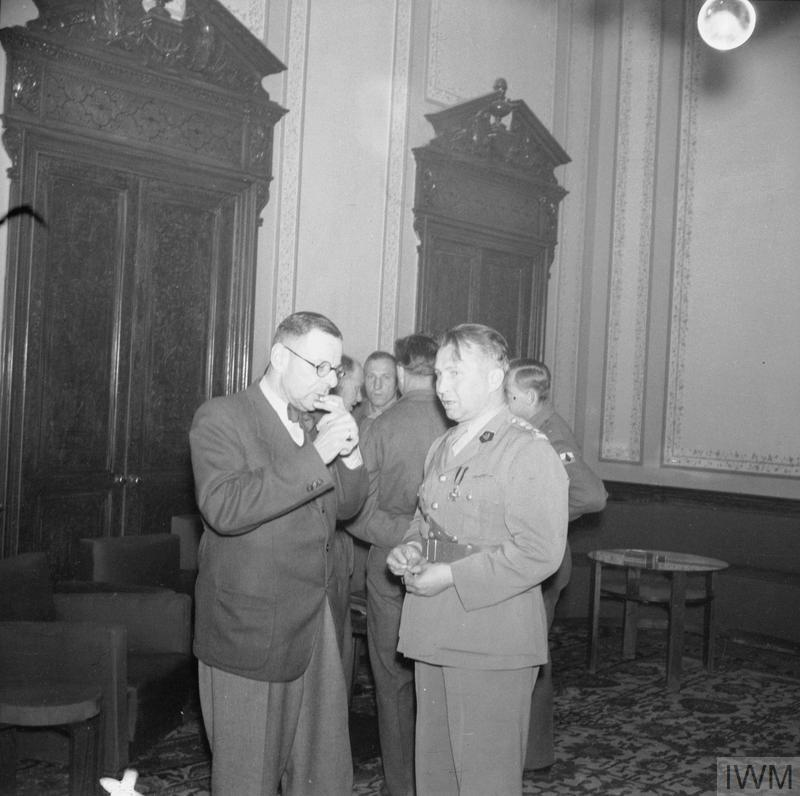
AT right: Col. Okulicki, commanding 7th Infantry Division in Persia

After a brief period commanding the Polish 7th Infantry Division, he was moved to London for training in the Cichociemni training camp and transported to occupied Poland. In July 1944, during Operation Tempest, he became the commander of the 2nd Echelon of the Home Army. General Bór-Komorowski, anticipating his own arrest by the Soviets after the Warsaw Uprising, named him his deputy and successor.

Okulicki fought in the Uprising, among other posts as chief of staff of the Home Army. After the capitulation of the Uprising, he managed to evade capture by the Germans and moved to Kraków, from where he started to reorganize the Home Army. On 3 October 1944, he became commander of the entire Home Army.

On 3 January 1945 he met in the "Zacisze estate" near Odrowąż, Radomsko County near Radomsko with the British special SOE Mission Freston. Capt D.T. Bill Hudson wrote on 3 January 1945: "we met the Commander of the Home Army and our friend, Colonel Rudkowski [...]. There were also several other people whose names and functions we did not have time to learn. The commander of the Home Army seemed to us a decisive, sincere and clear-minded man. His demeanor was calm and friendly. He knew many personalities from the London SOE office and stated that he commanded the 7th Infantry Division in the army of General Anders. We didn't know his name."

In order to protect Polish soldiers against the NKVD and more general Stalinist repression, Okulicki, in consultation with the government delegate and on the basis of the government instruction from London of November 14, 1944, providing for the dissolution of the Home Army in the areas occupied by the USSR, issued an order on 19 January 1945 dissolving the Home Army and releasing soldiers from their oath. He feared that the existence of Allied forces in Poland would only lead to the Soviets murdering or arresting more people.

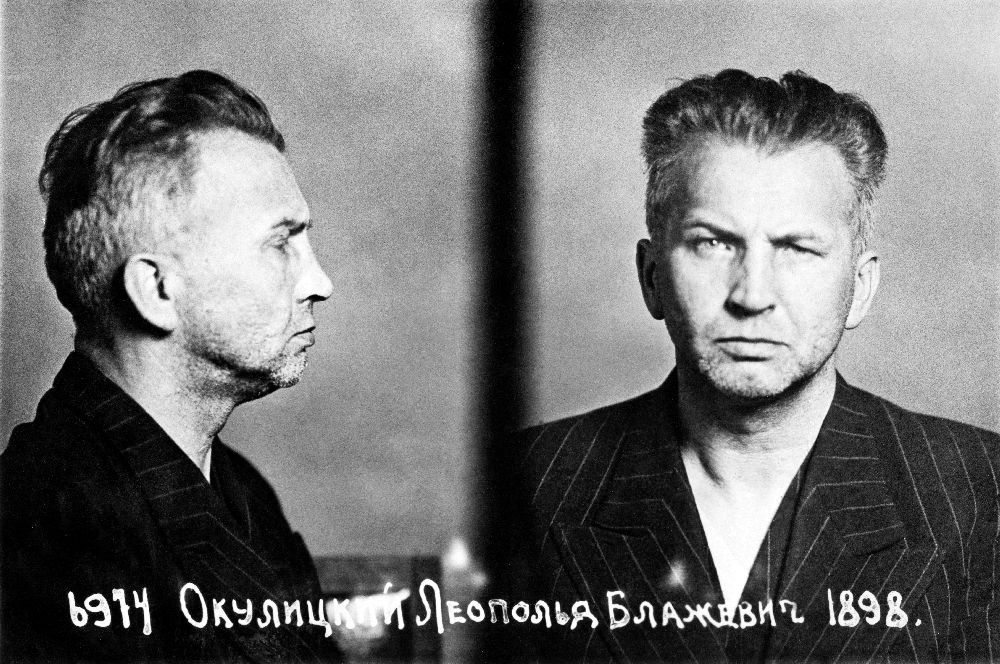
Okulicki after 1945 arrest by NKVD

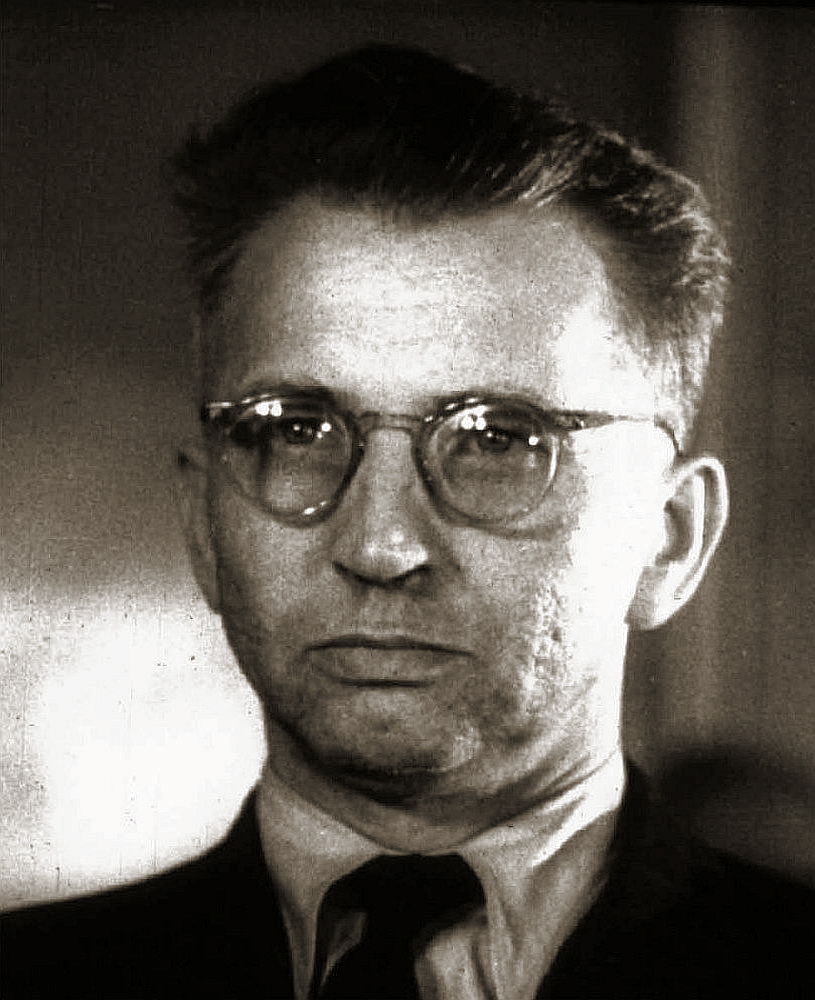
Okulicki during Trial of the Sixteen

In February 1945, Okulicki and his commanders were summoned by the NKVD to a meeting in Warsaw. They were arrested and then flown to Moscow. Okulicki was charged with "preparing an armed uprising against the Soviet Union in league with the Germans."

Okulicki was sentenced to 10 years' imprisonment in the staged Trial of the Sixteen. Under international law, this was a completely illegal verdict. He independently defended Poland in the courtroom against Soviet accusations. "He left the courtroom with his head held high," noted an Englishman present at the trial. Okulicki died 24 December 1946 at Butyrka prison. A cenotaph commemorating his death was built in the Powązki Military Cemetery, Warsaw.

== Decorations ==
- Order of the White Eagle, posthumously on 11 November 1995
- Order Virtuti Militari Golden Cross
- Order Virtuti Militari Silver Cross
- Cross of Independence
- Cross of Valour, 4 times
- Cross of Merit with Swords Golden Cross
- Legion of Merit, posthumously (USA)

Military offices
Preceded by Tadeusz Bór-Komorowski	Commander of the Home Army; 1944–1945	Succeeded by None – AK dissolved
