= Mission Freston =

Code-name of a British Special Operations Executive (SOE) military mission in Poland

Mission Freston was the code-name of the British Special Operations Executive (SOE) military mission under the command of Col. Capt D.T. Bill Hudson., to German-occupied Poland (1939–1945) during World War II. The soldiers taking part in it were parachuted on 26/27 December 1944, about 30 km south-east of Częstochowa, near the town of Żarki.

During World War II in February 1944, the Polish government-in-exile began efforts to obtain a British mission in German-occupied Poland. Seeing the reluctant attitude of Anthony Eden and the British Foreign Office, the head of SOE, Gen. Colin Gubbins, and the head of the Polish section of SOE, Lt. Col. Harold B. Perkins, decided to start their own preparations. Approval for the mission was probably obtained from Winston Churchill's office.

Members of the mission parachuted on the night of 26/27 December 1944 to the receiving station "Ogórek" ("Cucumber"), about 30 km south-east of Częstochowa, in Bystrzanowice near Żarki (location: N 50°41'00" E 19°31' 40"). It was the fourth flight of this team, in the previous ones ( 21/22 October, 18/19 November, 25/26 December) the task could not be completed. Fifteen canisters and three parcels were also dropped, along with jumpers, in six raids on the receiving facility from 21.02 to 21.21.

The Freston Mission included the following soldiers: commander Col. Capt D.T. Bill Hudson from SOE, Deputy Commander Maj. Peter Sooly-Flood from MI-6, Maj. Peter Kemp (writer), Senior Sgt. Donald Galbraith of the Royal Signal Corps. Among the members of the mission was also the Cichociemni (the "Silent Unseen") Capt. Antoni Pospieszalski pseudonym "Łuk" ("Bow"), going by his wife's last name as Capt. Anthony Currie, liaison officer, translator and radio operator, instructor at the Cichociemni training center in Audley End House.

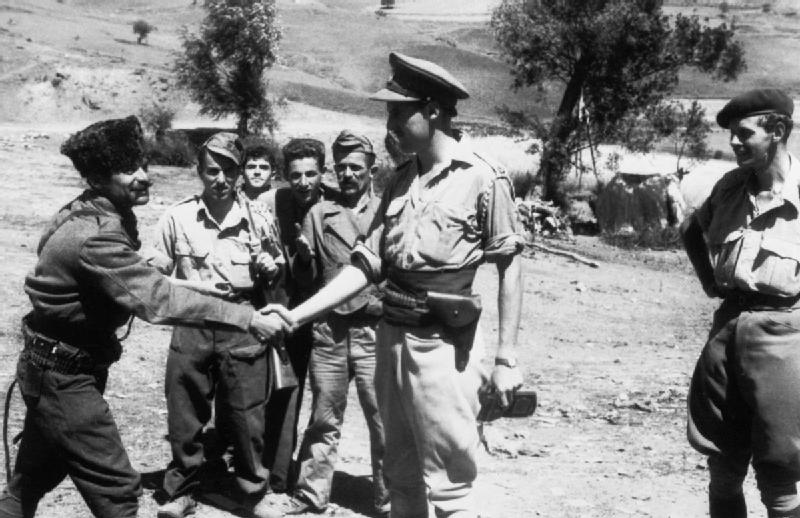
To the right, Peter Kemp (writer), August 1943 during the first SOE mission to Albania.

The mission's task, delayed by at least half a year, after Warsaw Uprising, was to play a liaison role between the Home Army Headquarters and the Soviet command. 50 Home Army soldiers were assigned to protect the British mission. After landing, the British were picked up by the management of the Home Army Częstochowa district, including head of the metastasis department in the Częstochowa Home Army Inspectorate, lieutenant Franciszek Makuch pseudonym "Roman", commander of the Home Army sub-circuit, Lieutenant Jan Dzitkowski pseudonym "Drużba". The 3rd company of the 2nd battalion of the 27th Infantry Regiment of the Home Army under the command of Lieutenant Stanisław Wencel pseudonym "Twardy" was assigned to the first cover of the mission. On 29 December, in the Home Army district in Radomsko, the mission was taken over by Lieutenant Szymon Zaremba, pseudonym "Jerzy". In the protection of the mission assisted 2nd Lieutenant Józef Kotecki pseudonym "Warta".

In defense of the British military mission "Freston", in the fight against the Germans possessing tanks and armored vehicles, a Polish Home Army soldier from a security company died – a Master Corporal pseudonym "Newada" (en. "Nevada"). This soldier operated a hand machine gun.

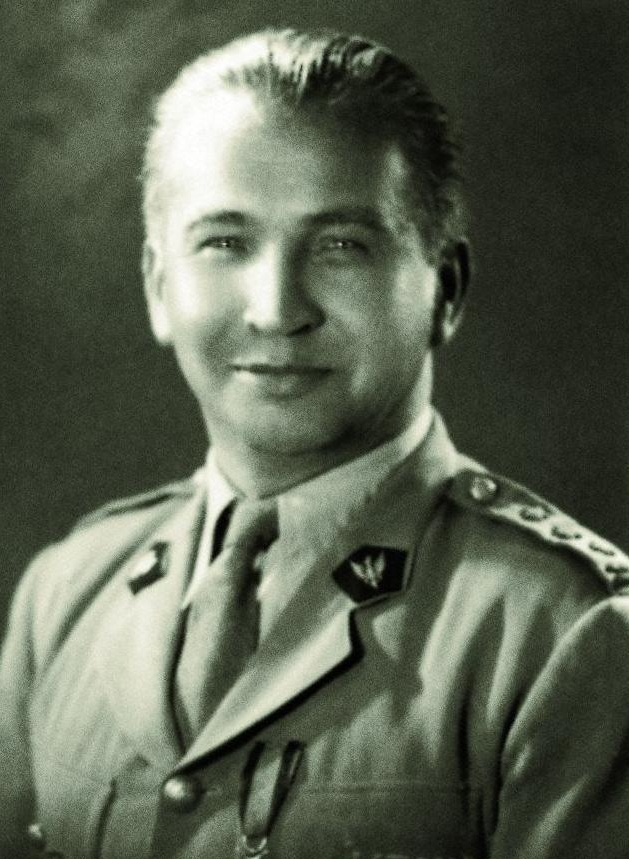
Commander of the Home Army, General Leopold Okulicki.

On 3 January 1945, the commander of the Home Army, General Leopold Okulicki, met in the "Zacisze estate" near Odrowąż, Radomsko County near Radomsko with the British special mission "Freston". Capt D.T. Bill Hudson wrote on 3 January 1945: "[...] we met the Commander of the Home Army and our friend, Colonel Rudkowski [...]. There were also several other people whose names and functions we did not have time to learn. The commander of the Home Army seemed to us a decisive, sincere and clear-minded man. His demeanor was calm and friendly. He knew many personalities from the London SOE office and stated that he commanded the 7th Infantry Division in the army of General Anders. We didn't know his name." The group of five was joined by Lieutenant Szymon Zaremba on the order of General Okulicki as a liaison officer responsible for the stay of the members of the mission in Poland.

After the occupation of these areas by the Red Army, the British revealed themselves, were arrested by the Soviet NKVD., transported to a Soviet prison in Częstochowa, and then to Moscow in the USSR, and released only after the Yalta Conference

In 1996, Queen Elizabeth II met with the veterans of the "Freston" Mission Protection Company in Warsaw in Poland to thank them for their heroism.
