= Peter Kemp (writer) =

English soldier and writer (1915–1993)

Peter Kemp M.C., D.S.O.
- Kemp in the Spanish Legion, 1930s.
- Born: Peter Mant MacIntyre Kemp; 19 August 1915; Bombay, India
- Died: 30 October 1993 (aged 78); London, England
- Alma mater: University of Cambridge
- Military career
- Allegiance: Nationalist; United Kingdom
- Branch: Spanish Army; Special Operations Executive
- Service years: 1936–1938 (Spanish Army); 1941–1946 (British Army)
- Units: Requetés; Spanish Legion
- Conflicts: Spanish Civil War; World War II; War in Vietnam

Peter Mant MacIntyre Kemp (19 August 1915 – 30 October 1993) was an English soldier and writer. He became notable for his participation in the Spanish Civil War on the side of Franco's forces and, during World War II, as a member of the Special Operations Executive (SOE).

== Early life ==
The son of Sir Norman Kemp, a judge in British India, Kemp was educated at Wellington College. He studied classics and law at Trinity College, Cambridge, where he was secretary of the Cambridge University Conservative Association.

== Spanish Civil War ==
As a staunch conservative and monarchist, Kemp was alarmed by the rise of communism in Spain, and was motivated to join in the fight against them after hearing about the atrocities committed in Republican held areas of the country. In November 1936, shortly after the end of the Siege of Alcazar, he broke off from reading for the bar exam and travelled to Spain where he joined the Carlist Requetés militia under the Nationalists and later the Spanish Legion. He was given journalistic cover for entry into Spain by Collin Brooks, then editor of the Sunday Dispatch, "to collect news and transmit articles for the Sunday Dispatch from the Spanish Fronts of War". He later transferred to the Spanish Legion, where unusually for a non-Spaniard, he commanded a platoon. He took part in the Battle of Belchite. Kemp was often badgered by his Spanish comrades about whether he was a Freemason because of his Protestant background. On one occasion, his unit captured a Belfast man who had deserted from the Republican side. Kemp attempted to intervene on the man's behalf but was ordered to supervise his execution.

Wounded several times, he continued fighting until he suffered a shattered jaw and badly damaged hands in the summer of 1938, the result of a mortar bomb, and was repatriated to England. Just before he left Spain, he had a rare informal private meeting with Francisco Franco.

== World War II ==
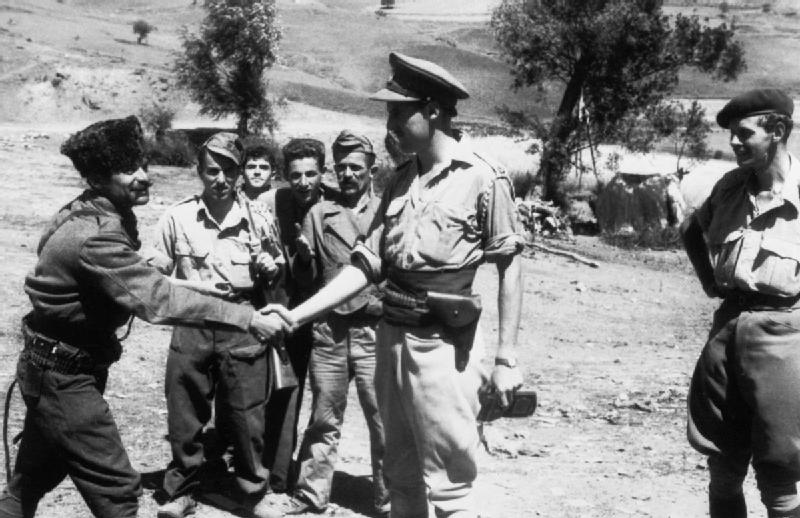
Xhelal Staravecke shaking hands with Major David Smiley at Shtylla, August 1943 during the first SOE mission to Albania. To the right, Peter Kemp

Having barely recovered from his jaw injury, Kemp had a chance meeting with Sir Douglas Dodds-Parker, the head of MIR, a small department of the War Office and a precursor to the Special Operations Executive. Becoming one of the earliest pupils at the Combined Operations Training School, he sailed in the hold of HMS Fidelity to Gibraltar and took part in a mission to pursue a German U-boat. A British destroyer fired at the submarine carrying Kemp by mistake and the mission was abandoned. With further parachute and commando training, he went on several cross-channel raids, as a member of the Small Scale raiding Force (SSRF) into Occupied France and one mission 'Operation Dryad' an official record is cited by (along with later life) was on 2–3 September 1942, where the seven man German garrison of Casquets lighthouse, off Alderney, were taken prisoner. Additional details from Gus March-Phillipps' official report of Operation Dryad and Peter Kemp's own recollections of his accidental wounding during Dryad from "No Colours or Crest" are available in Post 7. Another SSRF raid, Operation Fahrenheit led by him, was to capture German servicemen for interrogation by attacking a signals station at Pointe de Plouezec on the north Brittany coast. On the night of the 11/12 November 1942, the mission was not a success.

He was then posted to Albania, where he spent 10 months in clandestine operations. It was here that Kemp met future leader of Albania Enver Hoxha while working with the communist National Liberation Front. Kemp was frustrated by the inaction and what he saw as dishonest nature of the communist partisans. On one occasion, brigade-commander Mehmet Shehu, leading 800 partisans, had refused to attack 20 German soldiers out of fear of suffering too many casualties. It wasn't until after the war that Kemp learned that Shehu was preserving his troops as much as he could for a future war against non communists. Kemp regarded Shehu as a "gunman and a thug" and the LANÇ as a collection of dishonest murderers who were more concerned with attacking rival partisan groups than the Germans.

In August 1944, Kemp was informed that his next mission would be in Poland assisting the Polish Home Army in the Warsaw Uprising. The mission was put on hold due to pushback from Stalin who wanted neither the British nor Americans to support the Poles. SOE eventually decided to go ahead with a mission working with the Polish resistance, but by this time, the Warsaw Uprising had already been suppressed. Under the command of Bill Hudson, Kemp and other SOE agents dropped into south eastern Poland, near Częstochowa, with the goal of assisting the Home Army in an advisory role. It was the Mission Freston in German-occupied Poland (1939–1945). On New Years Day, the farm the SOE was using as an HQ was attacked by Germans, and Kemp and the other SOE agents barely escaped while the resistance fighters held back German half tracks to cover their retreat. After the Red Army had taken all of Poland, Hudson had received orders from London to turn themselves over to the Soviets. Expecting to be welcomed as friends and allies, Hudson, Kemp, and the rest of the SOE were instead imprisoned by the NKVD. During this imprisonment, they were regularly questioned and interrogated. Kemp believes they did this due to the ongoing Yalta Conference to see what the future of British-Soviet relations would be like before releasing SOE agents. Released after three weeks in prison, Kemp spent two further months in Moscow awaiting an exit visa before finally being turned back over to the British Army.

For his next mission, he was posted to Siam in the summer of 1945, where he helped safeguard French refugees from Indochina. He then ran guns to the French across the border in Laos in order to fight Viet Minh insurrectionists.

His final SOE mission was to Bali, for four months (December 1945-March 1946), then part of the Dutch East Indies, occupied by Japanese forces until March 1946, he was tasked to discover the Japanese intentions and facilitate their surrender.

Tuberculosis forced his retirement from the British Army once the war had ended.

== Later life ==
After the war, Kemp sold insurance policies and turned to writing. As a correspondent for The Tablet he travelled to Hungary to report on the 1956 Hungarian Revolution and helped some students escape to Austria. He was present in the Belgian Congo during the troubles that led to independence as Zaire, and he also covered revolutions in Central and South America. He was the foreign correspondent for The Spectator in Rhodesia and reported from there in December 1979.

His first memoir, Mine Were of Trouble, described his experiences in the Spanish Civil War. Later, No Colours or Crest described his wartime experiences in Albania and Poland as a Special Operations Executive agent and Alms for Oblivion described his postwar experiences in Bali and Lombok.

Before his death, he produced an autobiography in 1990, The Thorns of Memory.

== Books ==
- Mine Were of Trouble (1957)
- No Colours or Crest (1958)
- Alms for Oblivion (1962)
- The three memoirs have now been published together as Ten Years of War (2020), Passage Classics
- The Thorns of Memory (1990)
- Kemp also collaborated with David Smiley, a fellow member of SOE, on Arabian Assignment (1975)
