= Jodłówka =

Jodłówka may refer to the following places:

- Jodłówka, Lesser Poland Voivodeship (south Poland)
- Jodłówka, Podlaskie Voivodeship (north-east Poland)
- Jodłówka, Subcarpathian Voivodeship (south-east Poland)
