= Bill Hudson (British Army officer) =

WW2 SOE agent

- Hudson in uniform
- Born: Duane Tyrell Hudson; 11 August 1910; Bromley, Kent, England
- Died: 1 November 1995 (aged 85); Durban, South Africa
- Spouse: Ada Proskurnikova
- Military career
- Allegiance: United Kingdom
- Branch: Secret Intelligence Service; Special Operations Executive
- Service years: 1939–1945
- Rank: Colonel
- Nickname: Marko (nom de guerre)
- Conflicts: Yugoslavia in World War II
- Awards: Distinguished Service Order; Officer of the Order of the British Empire
- Memorials: Swimming complex at St. Andrew's College
- Other work: Mining Engineer

Colonel Duane Tyrell "Bill" Hudson, DSO, OBE (11 August 1910 – 1 November 1995) was a British Special Operations Executive officer who worked as a liaison officer with the Yugoslav Partisans and Chetniks in occupied Yugoslavia during World War II.

== Early life ==
Duane Tyrell Hudson was born on 11 August 1910 in Bromley, Kent, of South African parents. He attended St. Andrew's College in Grahamstown, South Africa, then the Royal School of Mines of the Imperial College London. He was a noted athlete, excelling in boxing, rugby, swimming, riding, skiing, and wrestling. Hudson was described as a "handsome, swashbuckling man" who was said to have been one of the inspirations for James Bond.

Having worked as a mining engineer in South Africa, in 1935 Hudson travelled to Yugoslavia where he was involved in mining and did some prospecting. The following year he married a White Russian ballerina, Ada Proskurnikova, living in Yugoslavia. She refused to live near the mine Hudson managed, and they soon divorced. By 1938, Hudson had become fluent in the Serbo-Croatian language. Hudson's mining activities included work as a consultant mining engineer in Belgrade, and as manager of an antimony mine in Zajača in the Mačva region, where he was working when World War II broke out.

== World War II ==
In the autumn of 1939, Hudson was recruited into Section D of the British Secret Intelligence Service (SIS), the section responsible for conducting political covert actions and paramilitary operations in time of war, and was based in Zagreb. During this period, one of Hudsons' SIS colleagues was murdered, and pro-German Croats planted a bomb beneath his office which nearly killed him. He established a sabotage organisation to attack Axis ships in Yugoslav Adriatic ports using limpet mines. Section D was absorbed into the new Special Operations Executive in mid-1940, and SOE headquarters for special operations in the Balkans was established in Cairo. In February 1941, Hudson personally sank an Italian ship. After the Axis invasion of Yugoslavia in April 1941, Hudson was extracted from the country.

=== Montenegro ===
On 13 September, Hudson and a small group of Yugoslav military personnel left Cairo by air for Malta on the first leg of a new SOE mission, codenamed "Bullseye". Three days later, they boarded the British submarine HMS Triumph, which landed the party on the coast of the Italian-occupied territory of Montenegro near Petrovac on the evening of 20 September. They were accompanied as far as the shore by Captain Julian Amery. Having left Cairo with little notice, they were forced to supplement their equipment from the submarine's stores. The party consisted of Hudson (using the nom de guerre "Marko"), former Royal Yugoslav Army Major Zaharije Ostojić, and two former members of the Royal Yugoslav Air Force, Major Mirko Lalatović and Sergeant Veljko Dragićević, who was a radio operator. All three Yugoslav crew members (Ostojić, Lalatović and Dragićević) were Montenegrins. The original intent had been for the party to consist only of Yugoslavs, and Hudson had only been ordered to accompany them 12 hours before they departed. Hudson's instructions were rather vague; he was expected to "contact, investigate, and report on all groups offering resistance to the enemy, regardless of race, creed or political persuasion". In addition, he was ordered to "discover who is fighting the enemy" and to "coordinate all elements of the resistance". The British did not know much about what was happening inside Yugoslavia in the summer of 1941 other than what they had learned from Ultra intelligence, which showed that German and Italian commanders in Yugoslavia were radioing messages back to Berlin and Rome complaining about attacks from "terrorists" and "bandits", which proved that some sort of resistance was going on.

The party was picked up by guerilla units near the coast, and by 26 September they were with a band of communist-led rebels led by Arso Jovanović and Milovan Đilas, one of many communist-led groups in Montenegro. These groups, along with nationalist-led Chetnik groups, were the scattered remnants of the forces that had rebelled against the Italians in July. The Italians had deployed Albanian irregulars to put down the rebellion in Montenegro, and the atrocities committed by the Albanians had generated a local backlash against the Communists who were blamed for recklessly starting an uprising that had no hope of success. The revolt had been suppressed within six weeks, and divisions had begun to appear between those rebels led by communists and those led by the Chetniks. Clashes had begun to occur, and Hudson assessed that the communist-led groups were stronger. Initially based at the village of Radovče, about 16 kilometres (10 mi) north of the Italian headquarters at Podgorica, Hudson radioed Malta recommending that assistance be provided to the communist-led rebels in Montenegro. Hudson reported that the "Montenegrin Freedom Force" had about 5,000 men under arms, and that the Communist Partisans were better disciplined and more committed to fighting than the Chetniks.

On 10 September, the British in Malta picked up a radio message indicating that a Colonel Mihailović was leading a guerilla force located in western Serbia. Unbeknownst to Hudson, the Yugoslav members of his party were already aware of this, and they had been ordered by the Yugoslav government-in-exile to travel to Mihailović's headquarters as soon as possible. On 9 October Hudson was made aware of Mihailović's existence by his British contacts, and he was also ordered to journey to western Serbia, as Mihailović did not have radio codes to encrypt his messages. Hudson and Ostojić departed for Serbia around 13 October, accompanied by Jovanović, Đilas and another senior Partisan, Mitar Bakić. The leaders of the Montenegrin Partisans needed to visit their own supreme headquarters in Užice in western Serbia to receive directions on how to handle relations with the nationalists. The party left its two radios behind with Lalatović and Dragićević, although one had already burnt out and the other was heavy and obsolete. Hudson apparently had not been trained in the operation of the radios.

=== Serbia ===
==== At Tito's headquarters ====
Hudson, Ostojić and the Partisan leaders travelled through Partisan-held liberated territory in Montenegro and the Sandžak to the valley of the West Morava river valley in the German-occupied territory of Serbia, during which Hudson further developed a favourable opinion of the Partisan organisation. The party arrived at Užice, the centre of the so-called Užice Republic around 25 October. Hudson met Josip Broz Tito, who was introduced to him by his pseudonym "Tito". He offered Tito the necessary technical information to communicate with SOE Cairo, if Tito could provide a radio. He advocated that Tito take up his offer, if only so that Tito could make his own case for material support. He told Tito that he also intended to visit Mihailović. Tito received Hudson cordially, but was noncommittal. At this point, relations between Tito and Mihailović were finely poised but the likelihood of ongoing cooperation was low. Tito did not share information about Partisan dispositions with Hudson, and Hudson emphasised that British interests were best served by a unified Yugoslav resistance. Tito, for his part, indicated to Hudson that he wanted to avoid conflict with Mihailović, but considered that all former Yugoslav officers had been compromised by its disastrous showing during the invasion. Tito told Hudson that if Mihailović would not cooperate with him, he expected that the Chetnik leader would not interfere with Partisan operations against the Germans. Hudson witnessed the Partisans fighting the Germans around Krupanj, then returned to Užice. In the meantime, Ostojić had visited Mihailović and returned with a message from the Chetnik leader that Hudson should travel on to Mihailović's headquarters as soon as possible. Having left his wireless sets behind in Montenegro, Hudson had no contact with SOE Cairo during his stay in Užice.

==== At Mihailović's headquarters ====
Hudson left Užice on or around 25 October, and arrived at Mihailović's headquarters at the village of Brajići on the foothills of Ravna Gora on that day. Immediately upon his arrival, Hudson was upbraided by Mihailović for having been with the "communist rabble", and when Hudson advised the Chetnik leader that he would be visiting Tito from time to time, Mihailović threatened to break of relations with the British if that occurred. Less than two days after Hudson's arrival at Ravna Gora, Tito and Mihailović met to make one last effort at forming a joint command, but despite Tito's request that Hudson be present during the negotiations, Mihailović insisted it was not necessary. Despite a provisional agreement, the two leaders were at cross-purposes; Tito would not place himself or his forces under Mihailović's control, and would not conform with Mihailović's urging that he cease attacks on the Germans. By this time, Mihailović knew from Ostojić that he had official recognition from the Yugoslav government-in-exile, who had also promised British recognition and support. The situation in western Serbia was one of incipient civil war. Despite some jointly-held towns and joint operations by Partisans and Chetniks, an atmosphere of creeping distrust predominated between the two camps. Hudson himself still had no access to a wireless. Lalatović and Dragičević had arrived in Užice after Hudson's departure, but Lalatović had travelled on to Ravna Gora without Dragičević and the remaining working transmitter because Dragičević refused to accompany him. Dragičević joined the Partisans and became an important Partisan wireless operator.

Hudson was able to use Mihailović's radio, but from 2 November, Mihailović, confident of British support, began instigating clashes with Partisan bands, which Hudson was powerless to prevent. After the air delivery of some funds for Mihailović, Hudson sent a message to Cairo recommending that British support to Mihailović be conditional upon his co-operation with the Partisans. When the British government accepted Hudson's recommendation, Mihailović considered Hudson's actions to be sabotage, and their working relationship broke down. Tito, for his part, was unaware of Hudson's initial attempts to mediate, and that the airdrop of funds was undertaken against his advice. This meant that Tito also distrusted Hudson. In mid to late November, Hudson managed to get involved in three meetings between Chetniks and Partisans aimed at establishing a truce and a joint operational headquarters. The Partisans maintained that they would do so, but would not accept Mihailović assuming overall command. The Yugoslav government-in-exile even put pressure on Mihailović to work with the Partisans.

=== The Failure of the Mission ===
Hudson's attempts to persuade the Partisans and Chetniks to work together to fight against the enemy completely failed and soon the two groups were fighting each other. For months, Hudson found himself on his own, living a hardscrabble existence, evading the German and Italian forces who were occupying Yugoslavia, and fruitlessly attempting to end the civil war between the Partisans and the Chetniks.

=== Poland ===
In the last months of World War II, Hudson headed a SOE mission Mission Freston in German-occupied Poland (1939–1945) that was meant to liaison with the Home Army. The parachute drop into Poland was made on 26–27 December 1944. On 3 January 1945 Bill Hudson and his British SOE special Mission Freston met at the "Zacisze estate" near Odrowąż, Radomsko County near Radomsko with the commander of the Polish Home Army, General Leopold Okulicki. Bill Hudson had a long conversation in Poland with the commander of the Home Army, General Leopold Okulicki. Capt D.T. Bill Hudson wrote on 3 January 1945: "We met the Commander of the Home Army and our friend, Colonel Rudkowski [...]. There were also several other people whose names and functions we did not have time to learn. The commander of the Home Army seemed to us a decisive, sincere and clear-minded man. His demeanor was calm and friendly. He knew many personalities from the London SOE office and stated that he commanded the 7th Infantry Division in the army of General Władysław Anders. We didn't know his name." After the Soviet offensive began in 1945, he received instructions from London that all members of the British mission were to surrender to the nearest Soviet command. The entire mission was arrested on Stalin's orders. They were imprisoned in a Soviet prison in occupied Częstochowa. They were released only on 12 February 1945, after the end of the Yalta Conference. Hudson's work was cut short when he was arrested by the NKVD, and he was imprisoned for a short time in the Lubyanka. Afterwards, he was returned to Britain. Hudson and his soldiers returned to Great Britain via Moscow, Odessa and the Middle East.

=== Missing funds ===
One of Hudson's tasks was to distribute British funds in order to pay for anti-Nazi fighters. He was given more than £80,000 in sovereigns and diamonds, worth over £1.75m in today's currency, which he partially buried in peasant villages. He later confessed that after the war, parts of the treasure were buried, with the aim of retrieving it on his own account when the war ended.

Afterwards, while he was working for the army in Romania, documents show that Hudson recruited Stephen Zollner, a Hungarian Jew buying timber for the British government around eastern Europe, to retrieve the treasure. Zollner managed to acquire three parts of the buried treasure, and sent them to Hudson in a diplomatic bag. The Yugoslav authorities caught him, however, and Zollner confessed everything.

== Later life ==
Hudson later moved to South Africa, where he died on 1 November 1995.

The swimming complex at St. Andrew's College was named in his honour when, upon his death, he left the school a considerable amount of money for new pool facilities.

Upon his death, the D.T Hudson Trust was created as a charitable trust. Amongst other activities, the trust sponsors schools in South Africa and takes a view to uniting the churches of the region in this pursuit.

== In popular culture ==
Hudson spoke six foreign languages and had a reputation as a ladies' man. According to The Sunday Times, Ian Fleming used Hudson as a model for his character James Bond, although it has also been suggested that the character was modelled on his brother, Peter Fleming.

== See also ==
- Operation Mihailović
