= Dąbrówka, Bochnia County =

Dąbrówka
- Village
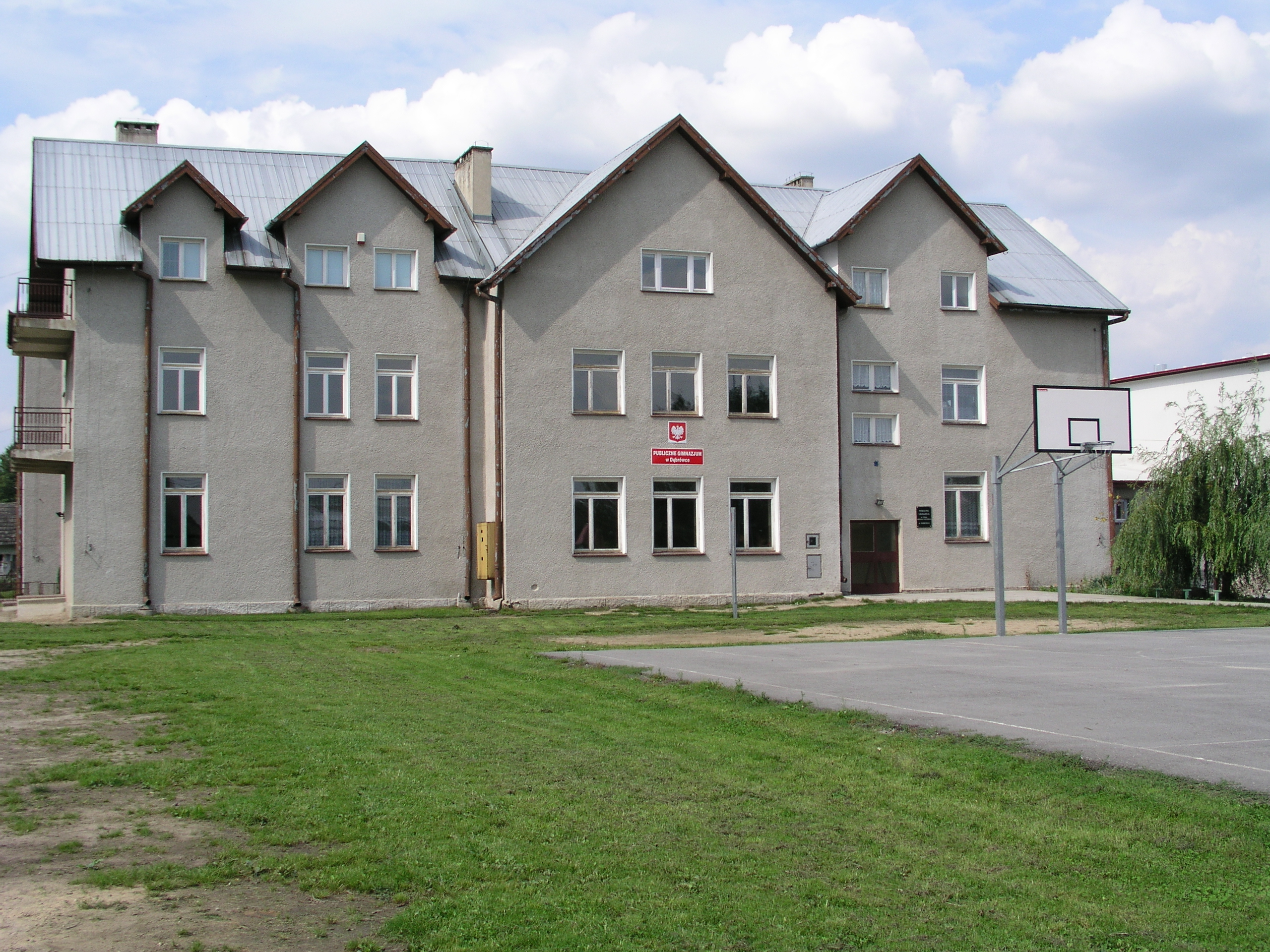
- School

- Location within Poland
- Coordinates: 50°3′N 20°34′E
- Country: Poland
- Voivodeship: Lesser Poland
- County: Bochnia
- Gmina: Rzezawa
- Population: 900

Dąbrówka [dɔmˈbrufka] is a village in the administrative district of Gmina Rzezawa, within Bochnia County, Lesser Poland Voivodeship, in southern Poland.
