= Okulice, Lesser Poland Voivodeship =

Okulice
- Village
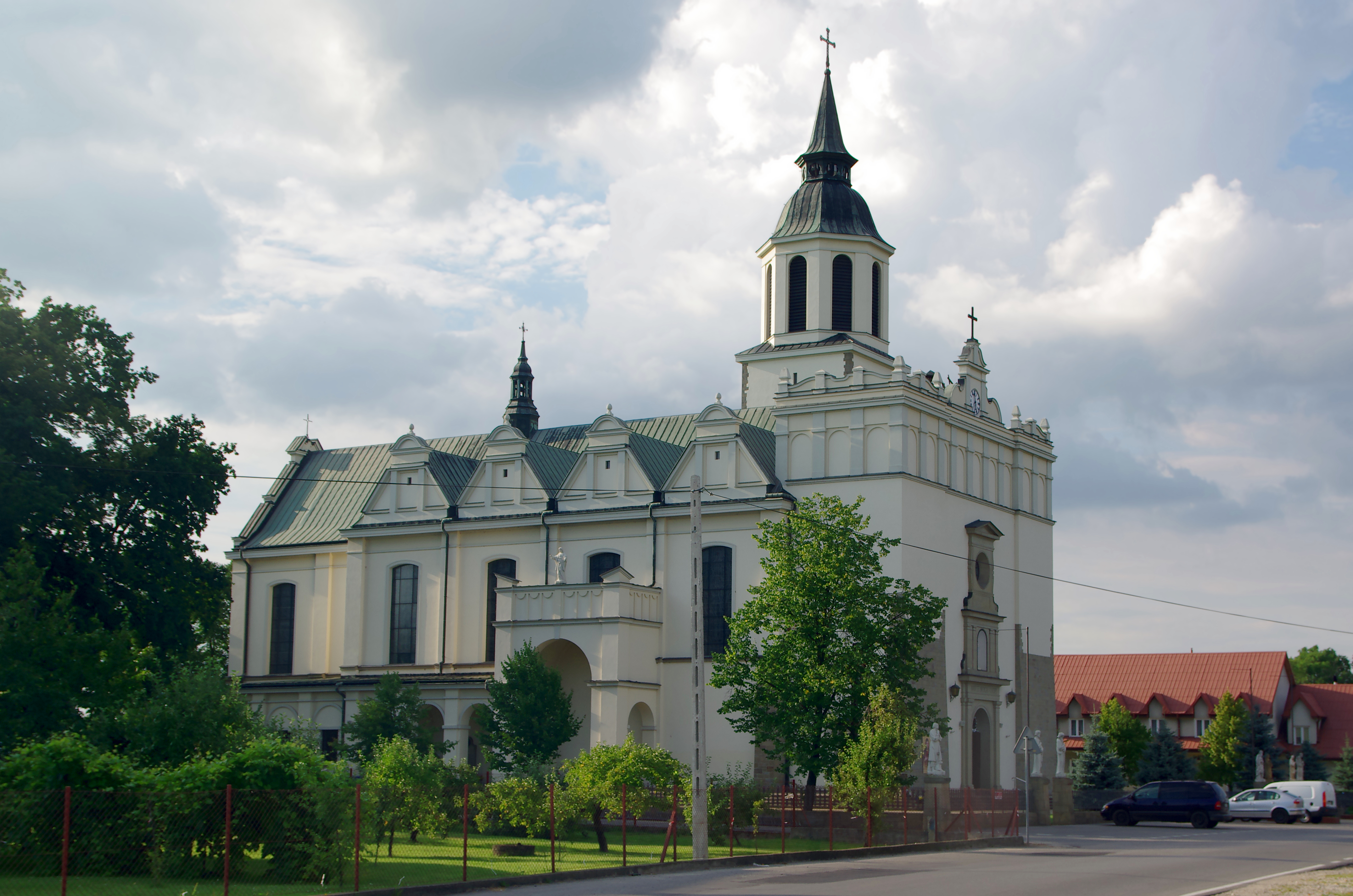
- Catholic church

- Location within Poland
- Coordinates: 50°4′N 20°32′E
- Country: Poland
- Voivodeship: Lesser Poland
- County: Bochnia
- Gmina: Rzezawa
- Population: 250

Okulice [ɔkuˈlit͡sɛ] is a village in the administrative district of Gmina Rzezawa, within Bochnia County, Lesser Poland Voivodeship, in southern Poland.
