= Rzezawa =

- Village
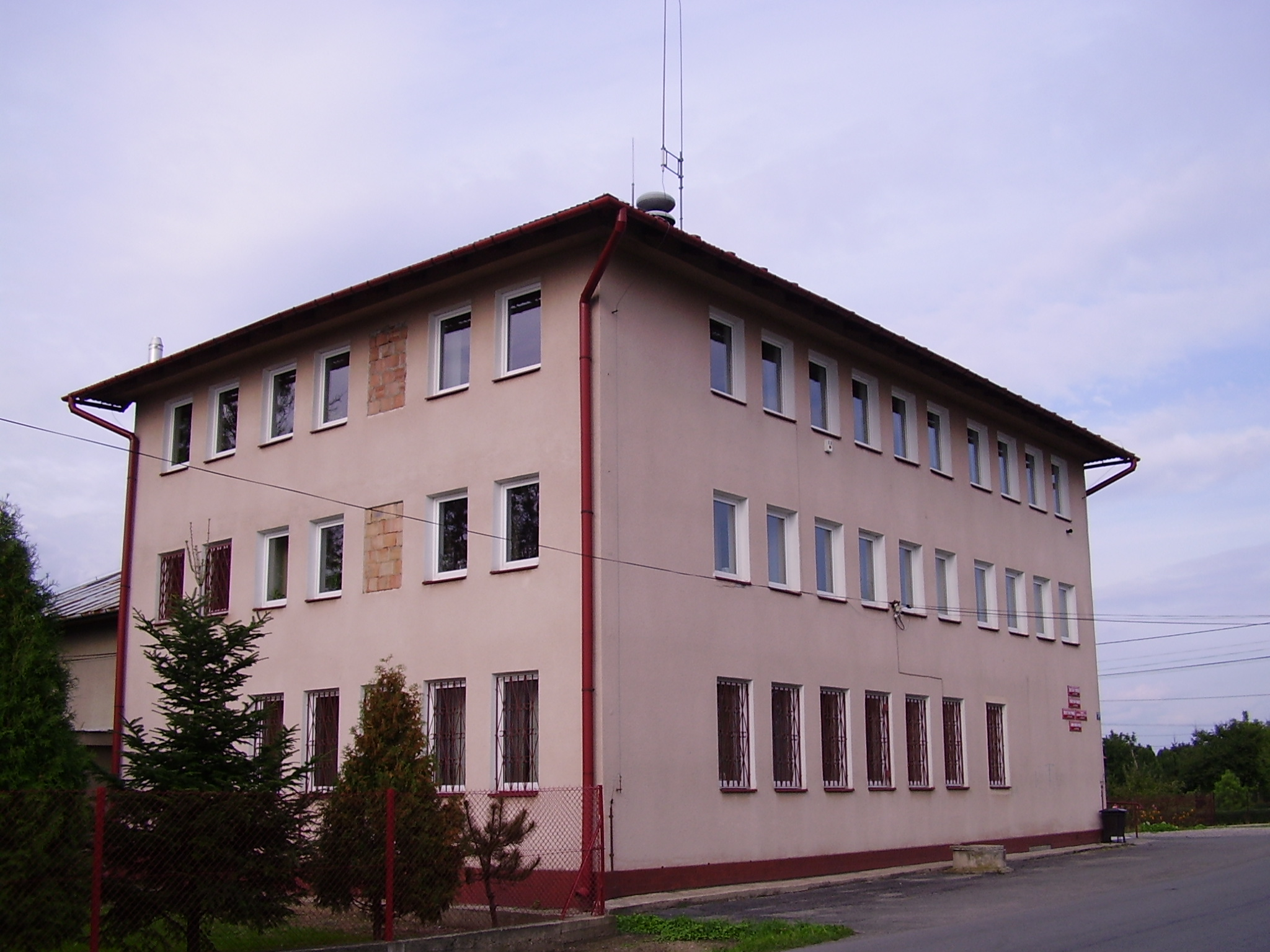
- Gmina office

- Location within Poland
- Coordinates: 49°59′N 20°31′E
- Country: Poland
- Voivodeship: Lesser Poland
- County: Bochnia
- Gmina: Rzezawa
- Population: 2,500

Rzezawa [ʐɛˈzava] is a village in Bochnia County, Lesser Poland Voivodeship, in southern Poland. It is the seat of the gmina (administrative district) called Gmina Rzezawa.
