= Gmina Rzezawa =

Gmina Rzezawa Rzezawa Commune
- Gmina
- Coat of arms
- Interactive map of Gmina Rzezawa
- Coordinates (Rzezawa): 49°59′N 20°31′E
- Country: Poland
- Voivodeship: Lesser Poland
- County: Bochnia
- Seat: Rzezawa

Area
  - Total: 85.48 km^{2} (33.00 sq mi)

Population (2006)
  - Total: 10,473
  - Density: 122.5/km^{2} (317.3/sq mi)
- Website: http://www.rzezawa.pl/

Gmina Rzezawa is a rural gmina (administrative district) in Bochnia County, Lesser Poland Voivodeship, in southern Poland. Its seat is the village of Rzezawa, which lies approximately 6 kilometres (4 mi) east of Bochnia and 43 km (27 mi) east of the regional capital Kraków.

The gmina covers an area of 85.48 square kilometres (33.0 sq mi), and as of 2006 its total population is 10,473.

== Villages ==
Gmina Rzezawa contains the villages and settlements of Borek, Bratucice, Buczków, Dąbrówka, Dębina, Jodłówka, Krzeczów, Łazy, Okulice, Ostrów Królewski and Rzezawa.

== Neighbouring gminas ==
Gmina Rzezawa is bordered by the town of Bochnia and by the gminas of Bochnia, Brzesko and Szczurowa.
