= Ostrów Królewski =

- Village
- Location within Poland
- Coordinates: 50°1′N 20°29′E
- Country: Poland
- Voivodeship: Lesser Poland
- County: Bochnia
- Gmina: Rzezawa
- Population: 325
- Website: http://www.rzezawa.pl

Ostrów Królewski (Polish pronunciation: [ˈɔstruf kruˈlɛfskʲi]) is a village in the administrative district of Gmina Rzezawa, within Bochnia County, Lesser Poland Voivodeship, in southern Poland.
