= Przewodziszowice Castle =

Polish castle

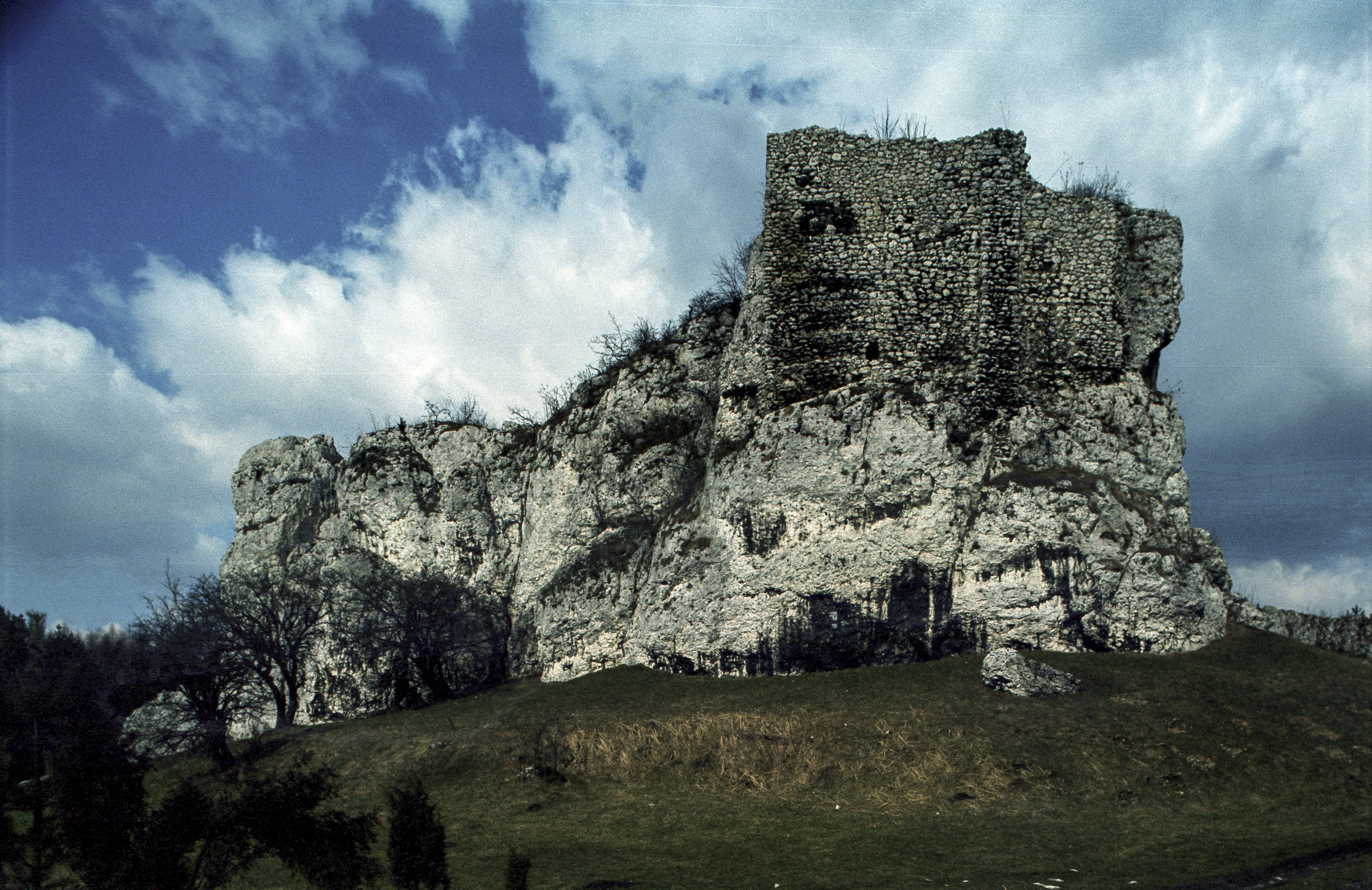
- Przewodziszowice Castle

- Location of the Przewodziszowice Castle in Poland
- 50°38′41″N 19°23′41″E
- Location: Żarki, Silesian Voivodeship, in Poland

History
- Built: 14th century

Site notes
- Architectural style: Gothic

Przewodziszowice Castle - brick fortress ruins, located on the peripheries of the former village of Przewodziszowice (now part of the town of Żarki), on the Kraków-Częstochowa Upland.

== History ==
The fortress was raised in the fourteenth, or on the turn of the fourteenth and fifteenth-century, as commanded by the Polish monarch Casimir III the Great, or Silesian duke Vladislaus II of Opole. Together with the Suliszowice Fortress, the fortresses served as a propounded flank of what now remains of the castle ruins located in the small forest osada of Ostrężnik Gmina Janów. In the fifteenth-century, the castle reserved as the residence for knight-highwayman Mikołaj Kornicz Siestrzeniec, known as "Siestrzeniec". According to a legend, the knight hid his loot in stone fissures or the castle well.
