= Krzeczów, Bochnia County =

Krzeczów
- Village
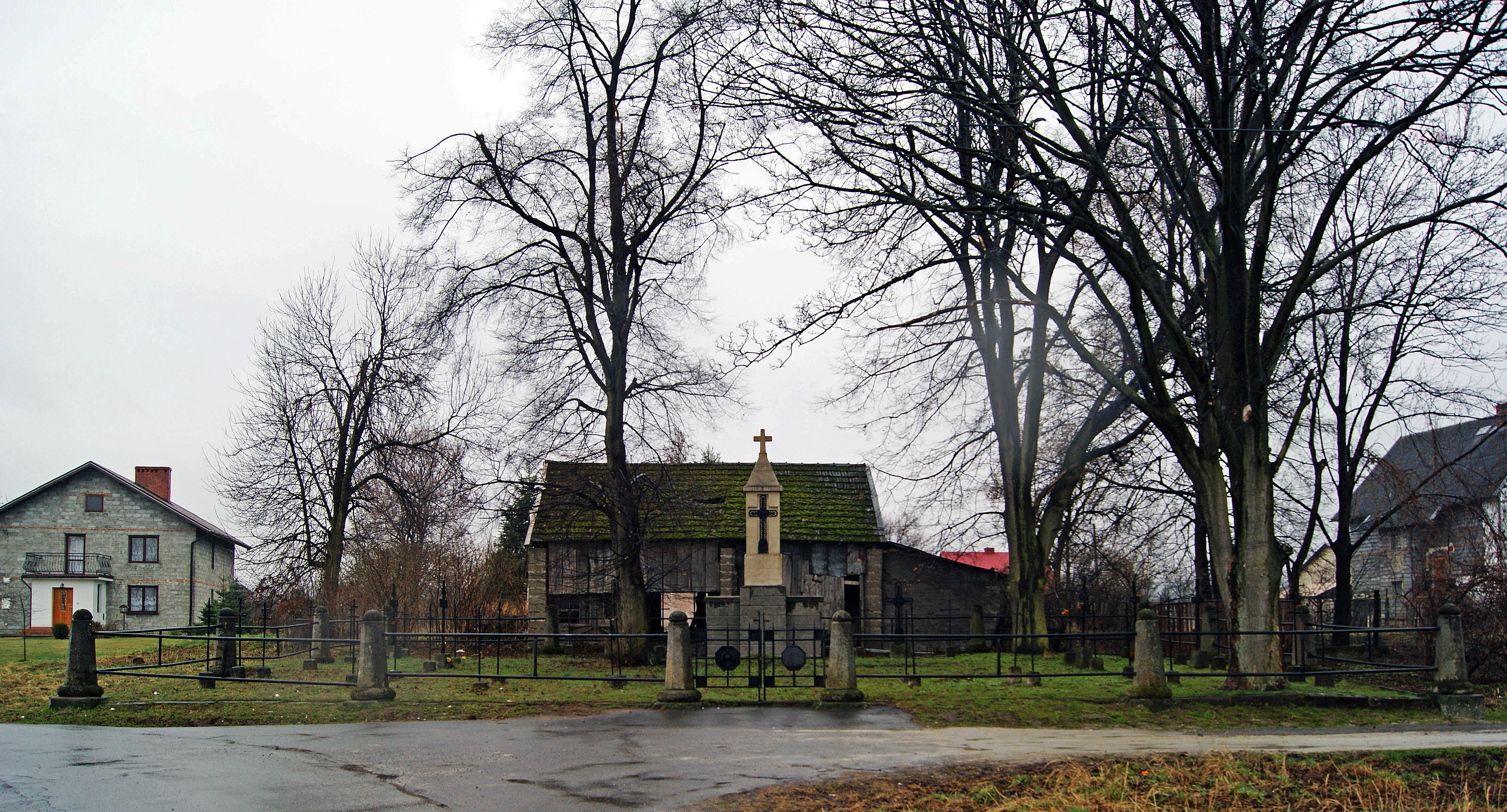

- Location within Poland
- Coordinates: 49°59′N 20°29′E
- Country: Poland
- Voivodeship: Lesser Poland
- County: Bochnia
- Gmina: Rzezawa

Krzeczów [ˈkʂɛt͡ʂuf] is a village in the administrative district of Gmina Rzezawa, within Bochnia County, Lesser Poland Voivodeship, in southern Poland.
