= New Jewish Cemetery, Żarki =

Jewish cemetery in southern Poland

New Jewish Cemetery in Żarki
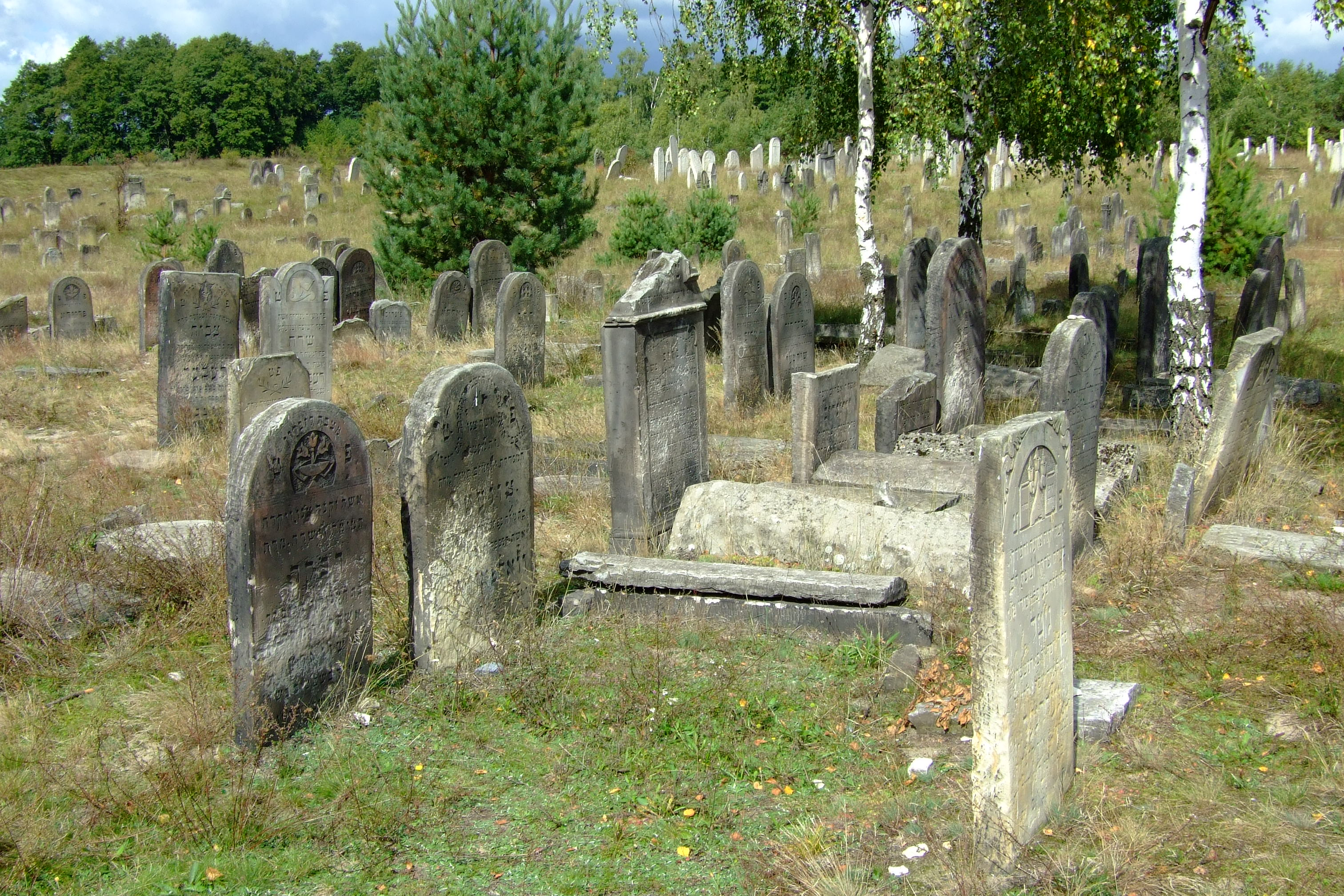
- Interactive map of New Jewish Cemetery in Żarki

Details
- Established: 1821
- Location: Żarki, Silesian Voivodeship
- Country: Poland
- Coordinates: 50°37′48″N 19°21′36″E
- Type: Religious cemetery
- Size: 1.5 ha

The New Jewish Cemetery, Żarki (Polish: Cmentarz żydowski w Żarkach) is a Jewish cemetery located in Żarki, on Polna Street.

Originally, three Jewish cemeteries existed in Żarki; only the cemetery on Polna Street — commonly referred to as the New Jewish Cemetery — has survived. The cemetery was established in 1821, covers an unfenced area of 1.5 hectares, and contains more than 700 preserved tombstones to this day. The oldest surviving gravestone dates from 1835.

The site is currently unfenced and remains accessible.

== Heritage status ==
The cemetery has been entered into the Polish Registry of Cultural Property for historic monuments, maintained by the National Institute of Cultural Heritage (Polish language abbreviation NID), under the Silesian Voivodeship:

- No. A/1457/24 of 20 September 2024 (Silesian Voivodeship)

The cemetery had previously been listed under the former local government arrangements as:

- No. A/416/87 of 25 February 1987 (former Częstochowa Voivodeship).

== Gallery ==
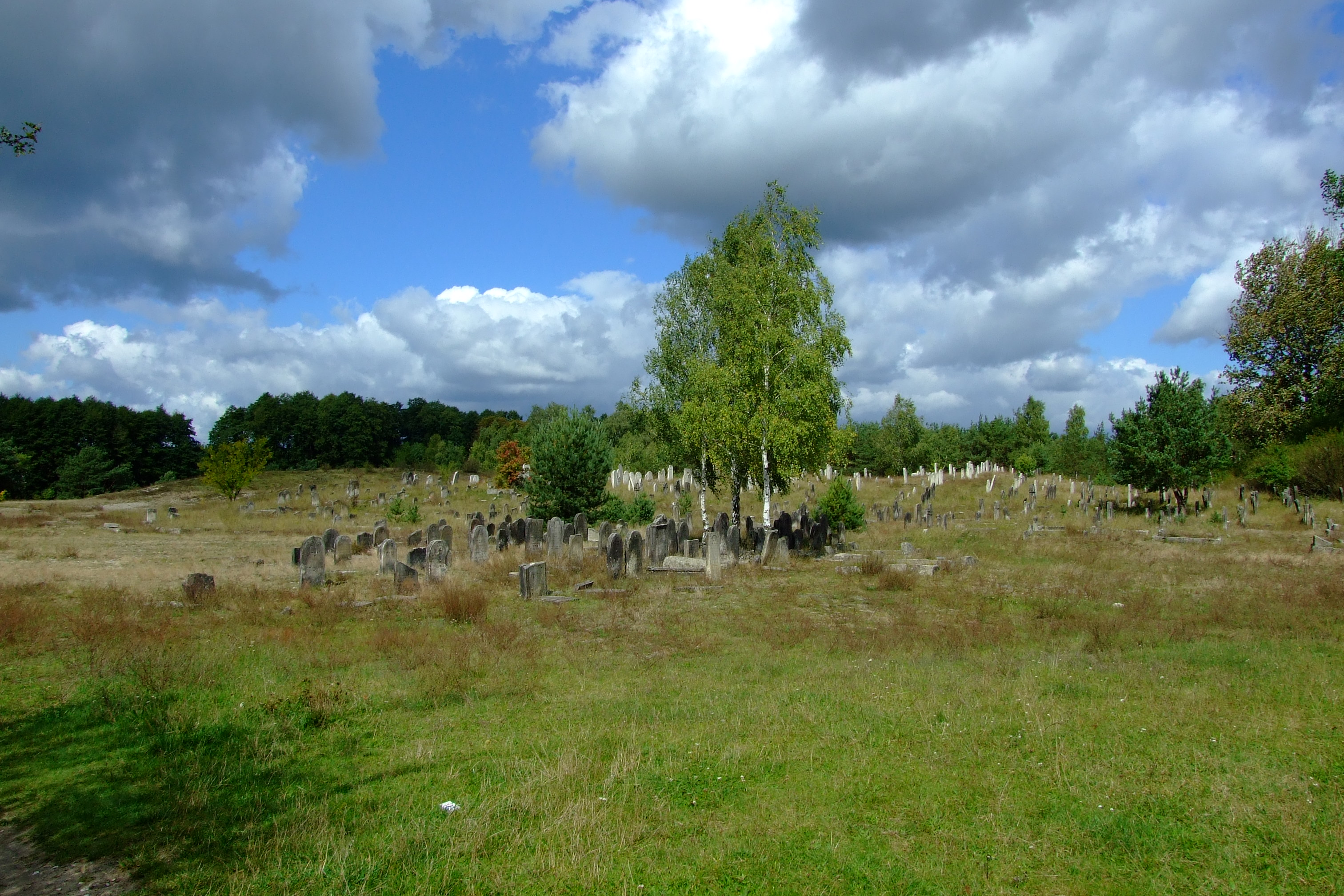

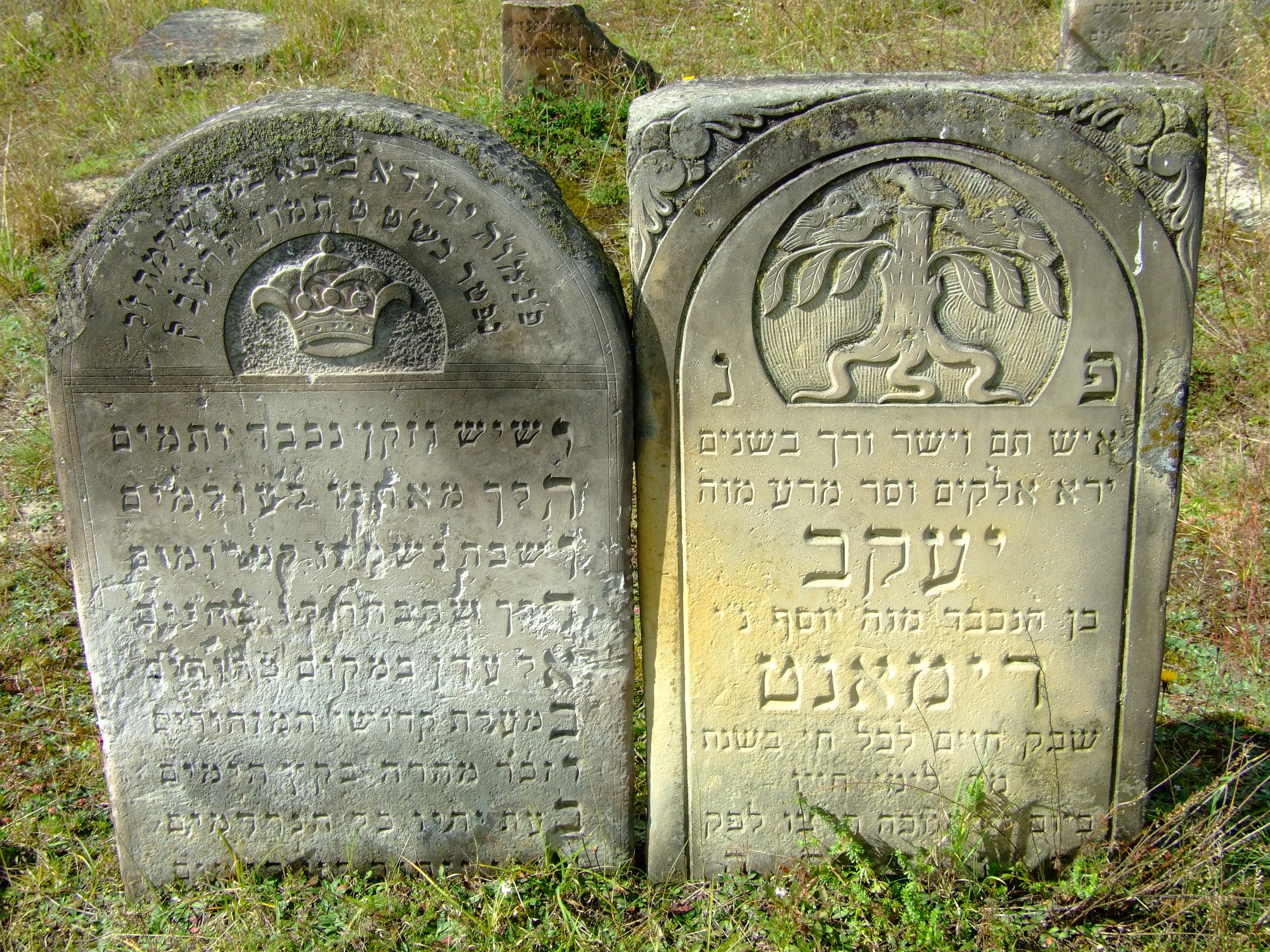

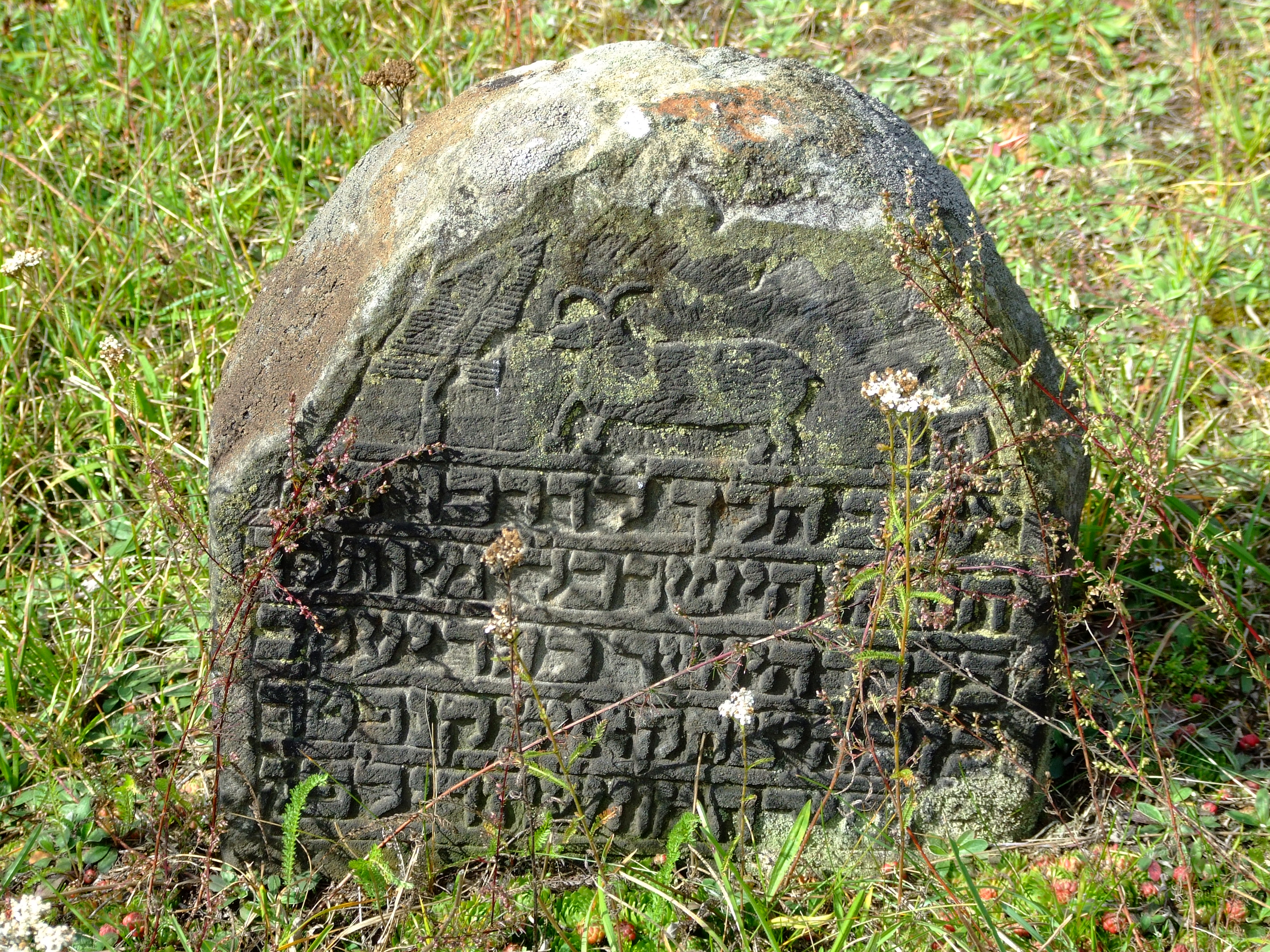

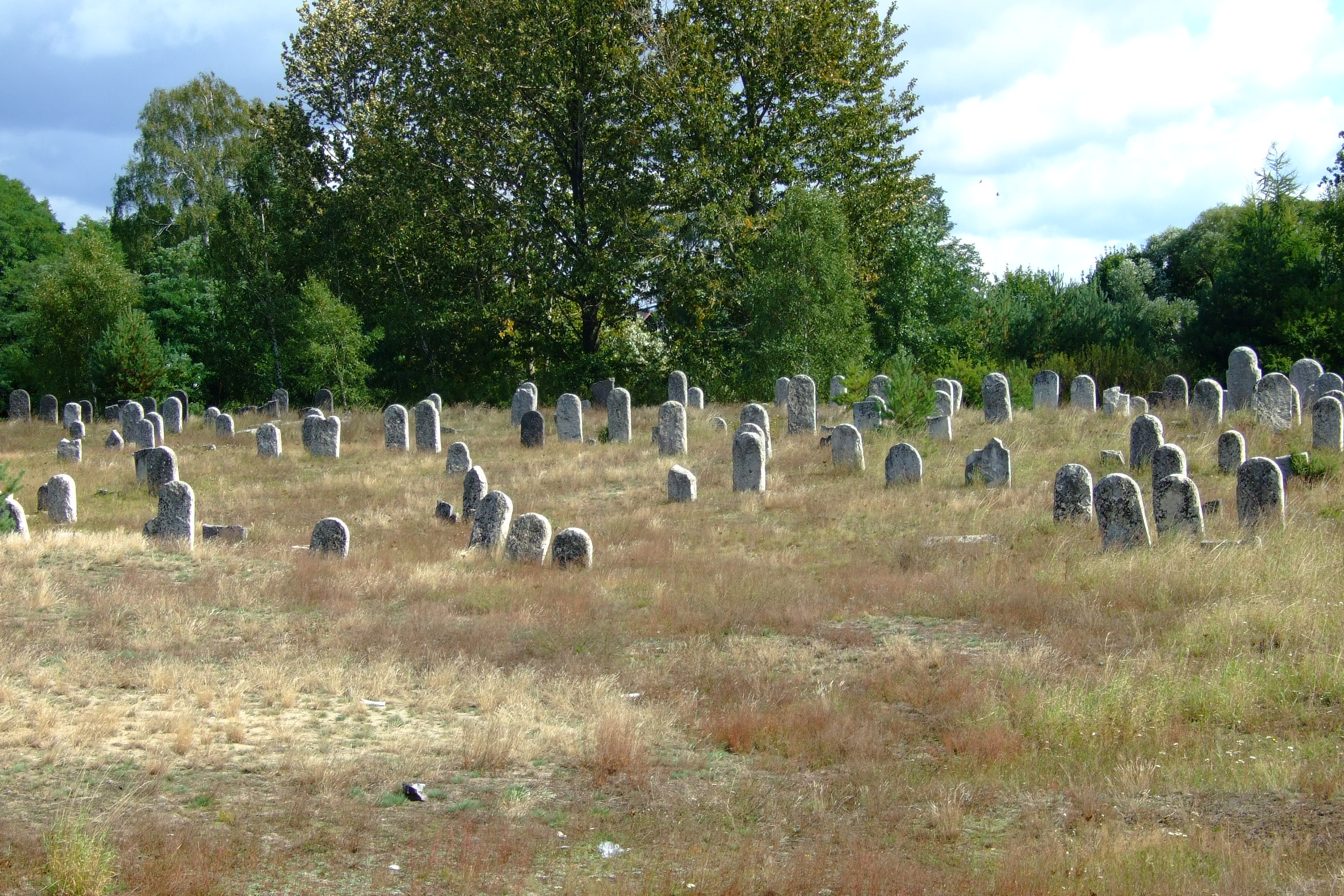

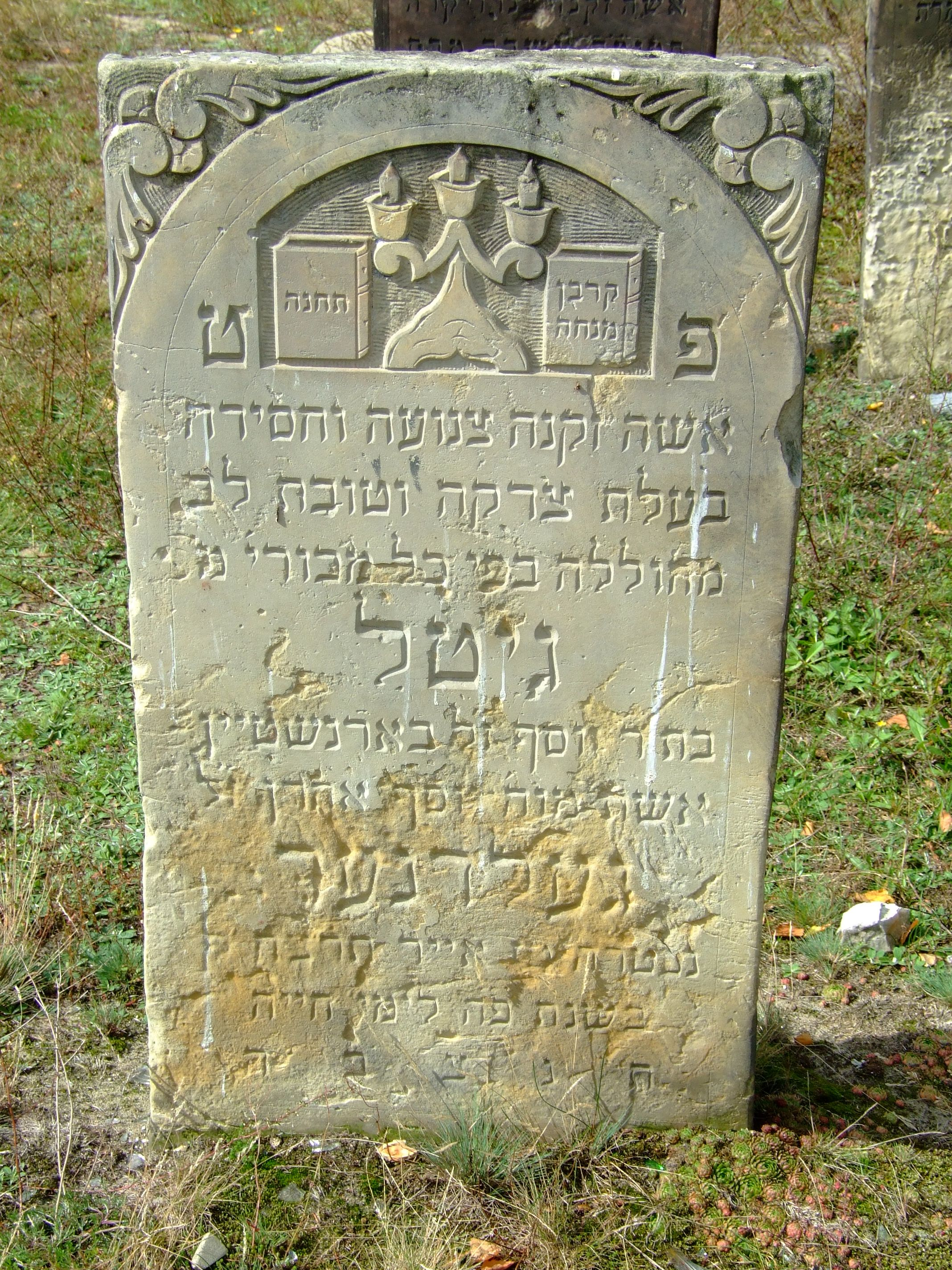

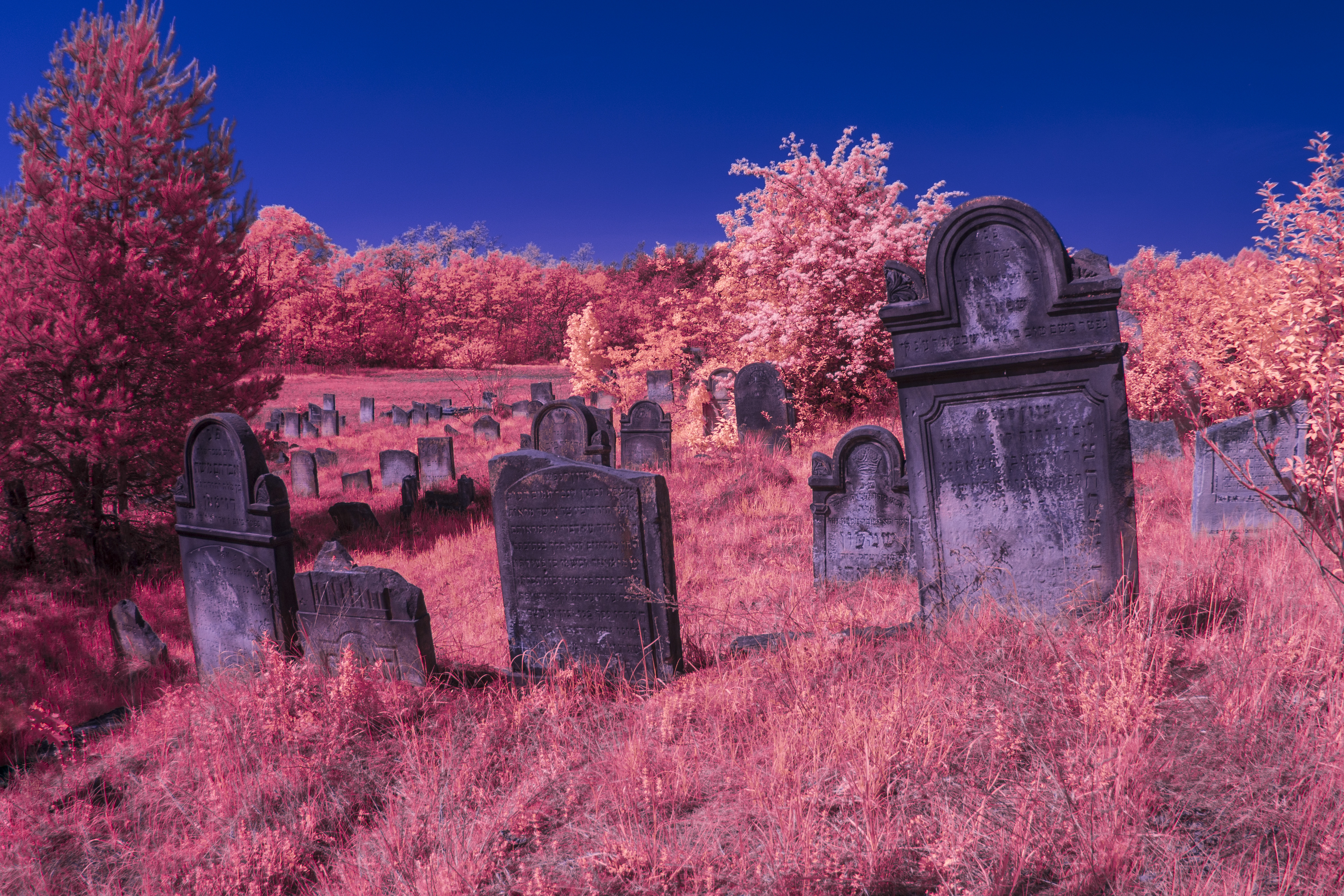
Jewish cemetery in Żarki — infrared photograph, awarded in the Wiki Loves Monuments 2022 competition in the category "Nieoczywiste Śląskie" ("Unobvious Silesian")

== Bibliography ==
- Burchard, Przemysław (1990). Pamiątki i zabytki kultury żydowskiej w Polsce [Souvenirs and monuments of Jewish culture in Poland] (in Polish). Warsaw: Burchard Edition. p. 135. OCLC 26195212.
- "Map of Żarki region (1925)" (in Polish). Military Geographical Institute (WIG).
- "Map of Żarki region (1934): Sheet 46 Column 29" (in Polish). Warsaw: Military Geographical Institute (WIG).
