= Bratucice =

- Village
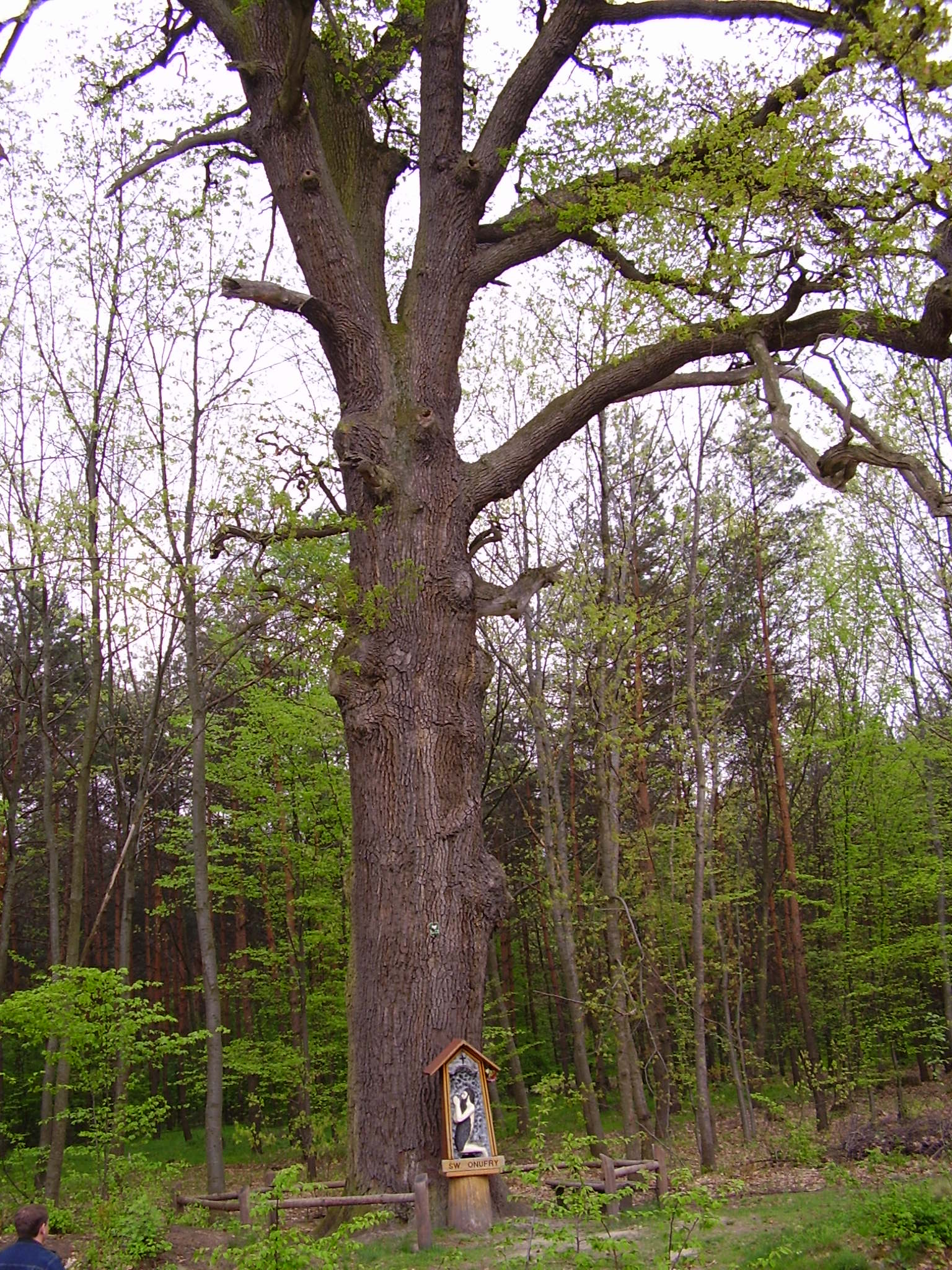
- St. Onuphrius's Oak in Bratucice

- Location within Poland
- Coordinates: 50°4′N 20°32′E
- Country: Poland
- Voivodeship: Lesser Poland
- County: Bochnia
- Gmina: Rzezawa
- Established: 1389
- Elevation: 188 m (617 ft)
- Population: 716
- Postal code: 32-712
- Area code: 14

Bratucice [bratuˈt͡ɕit͡sɛ] is a village in southern Poland, in the administrative district of Gmina Rzezawa within Bochnia County, Lesser Poland Voivodeship.
