= Jodłówka, Lesser Poland Voivodeship =

Jodłówka
- Village
- Location within Poland
- Coordinates: 49°59′N 20°33′E
- Country: Poland
- Voivodeship: Lesser Poland
- County: Bochnia
- Gmina: Rzezawa
- Population: 1,400

Jodłówka [jɔdˈwufka] is a village in the administrative district of Gmina Rzezawa, within Bochnia County, Lesser Poland Voivodeship, in southern Poland.
