= Żarki =

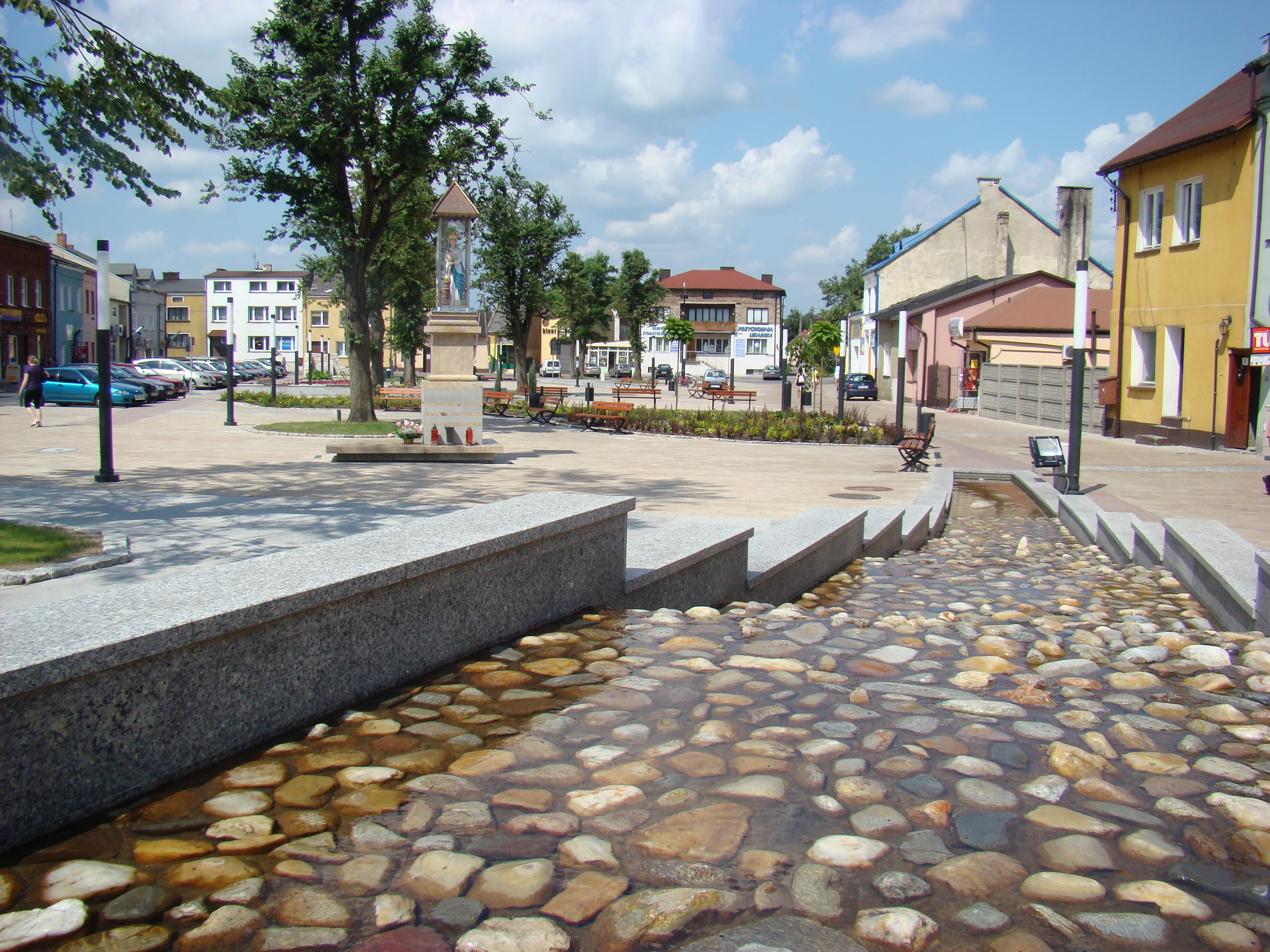
- Town square

- Coat of arms

- Location within Poland
- Coordinates: 50°37′41″N 19°22′13″E
- Country: Poland
- Voivodeship: Silesian
- County: Myszków
- Gmina: Żarki
- Town rights: before 1382

Area
  - Total: 25.68 km^{2} (9.92 sq mi)

Population (2019-06-30)
  - Total: 4,556
  - Density: 177.4/km^{2} (459.5/sq mi)
- Time zone: UTC+1 (CET)
  - Summer (DST): UTC+2 (CEST)
- Postal code: 42-310
- Vehicle registration: SMY
- Website: http://www.umigzarki.pl/

Żarki [ˈʐarki] is a town in Myszków County, Silesian Voivodeship, in southern Poland, with 4,556 inhabitants (2019).

== History ==
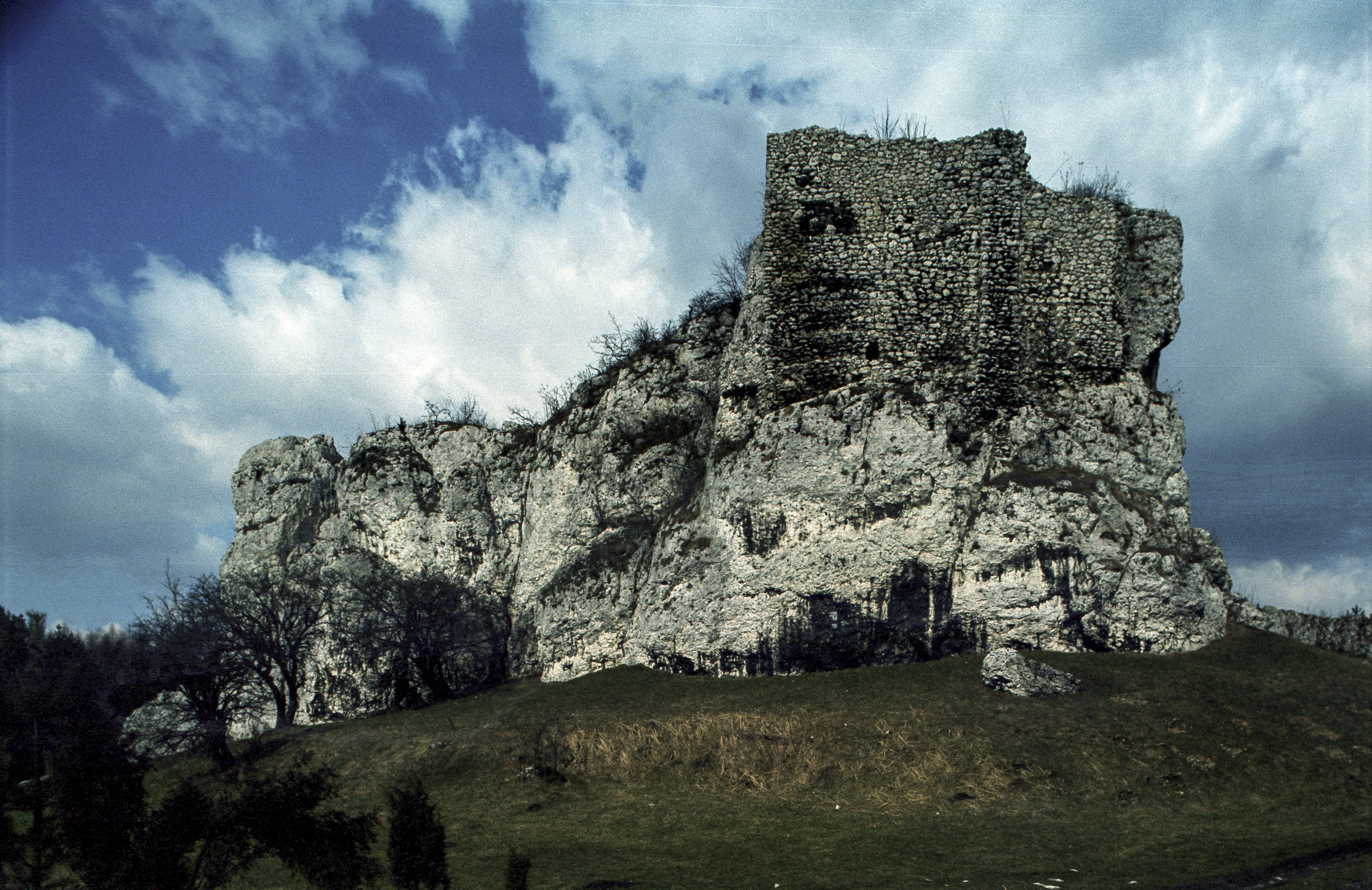
Medieval Przewodziszowice Castle

The history of Żarki dates back to the early 14th century, as the village was first mentioned in documents from the 1320s. It is not known when the village of Żarki received town charter: it happened before 1382, most likely during the reign of King Casimir III the Great. By 1406, Żarki already was a well established private town, governed by a vogt. Żarki belonged to several noble families, and was a local centre of craft and trade. For centuries, Żarki belonged to Lelow County, Kraków Voivodeship, Lesser Poland Province. In 1556, fairs were established on every Tuesday. Żarki had a market square, and its population in 1662 reached 620 residents. In 1664, the town burned in a great fire.

In 1720, Żarki was moved to a new location. At that time, the town became a center of iron ore mining, with a blast furnace. By 1791, its population grew to over 1200. In the Second Partition of Poland in 1793, the town was annexed by the Kingdom of Prussia. In 1807, Żarki became part of the Duchy of Warsaw, and in 1815, Russian-controlled Congress Poland, in which it remained until World War I. Due to efforts of Piotr Steinkeller, Żarki was an industrial center, where agricultural machinery was manufactured. In the 1850s, a cotton plant was opened here as well. Following the January Uprising, Żarki lost its town charter.

In 1914, the population of Żarki was app. 5000. During the month of October 1918, a short-lived local post was organized by the officer in charge of Civil Affairs of the District of Dabrow. In the Second Polish Republic, Żarki belonged to Zawiercie County of Kielce Voivodeship.

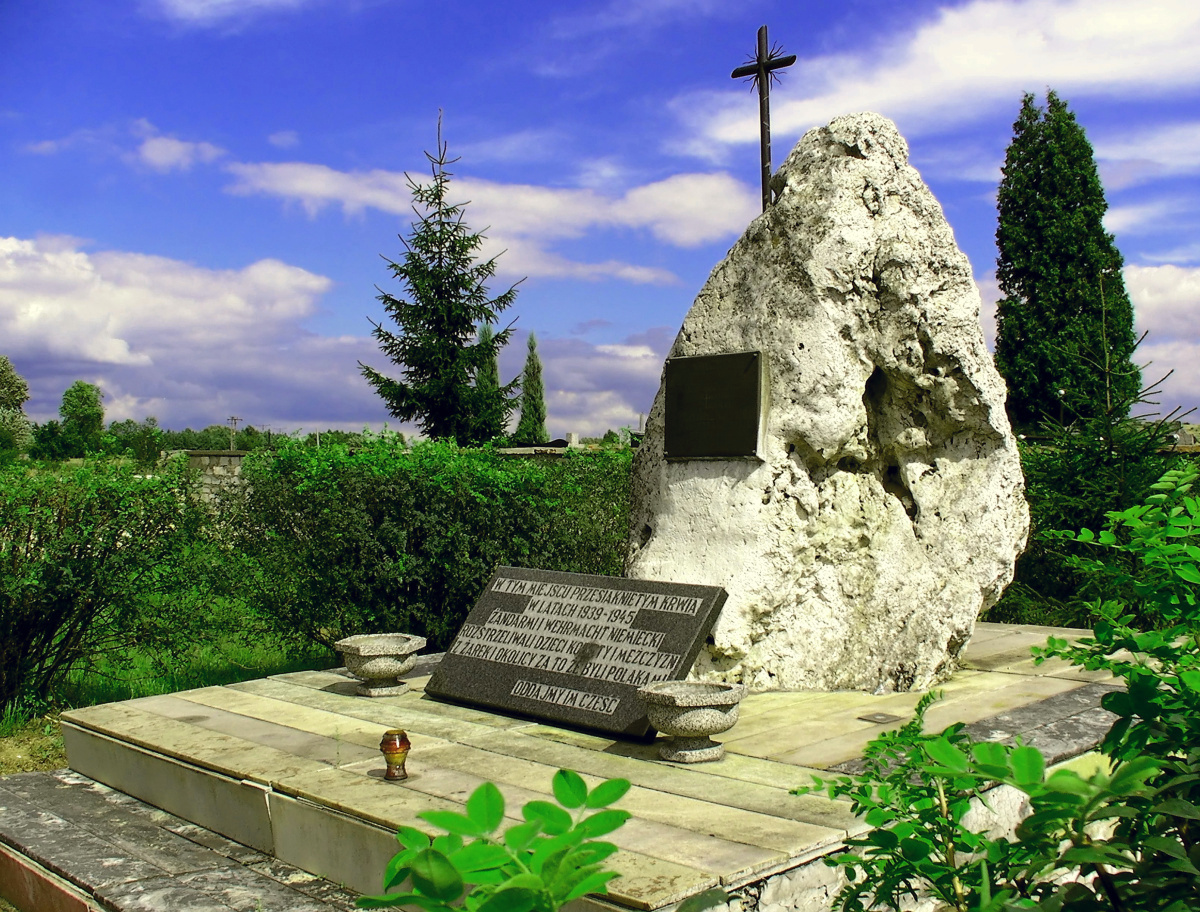
Memorial at the site of German executions of Poles

At the start of World War II, on September 4, 1939, Żarki was burned to the ground by the Wehrmacht. They shot more than 100 residents, most of whom were Jewish. Other Jews were robbed and many were conscripted for forced labor. Later, in late 1941 or early 1942, Jews, including those who had been deported to Zarki, were forced into an overcrowded ghetto without much access to food and medical care. Some young Jews were able to establish a small farm which provided vegetables, fruits, and fish to the Jewish residents. In October 1942, the Germans ordered Polish farmers to bring horses and wagons to the ghetto. Around 800 Jews were rounded up by the German SS, Ukrainian auxiliaries, and Blue police. Those in hiding who were caught were shot. The Polish farmers took the Jews to the train station in Zloty Potok and from there they were taken in freight cars to the Treblinka extermination camp where they were immediately murdered. About 1600 other Jews had fled when they heard the news that the Polish farmers had been ordered to come to the ghetto. Most fled to other ghettos and most eventually were murdered in killing camps. The number of Żarki Jews who survived the war and Holocaust is unknown.

Signs of Jewish heritage are still present in Żarki: there is new Jewish cemetery, building of former synagogue and a street in town center named after colonel Berek Joselewicz.

In 1949, Żarki regained its town charter.

== Demographics ==
| Year | Total population | Jewish population | Percentage of total population |
| 1741 | | 113 of adults | |
| 1791 | | 348 | |
| 1827 | 2.571 | 702 | 27.3% |
| 1857 | | 1.544 | |
| 1864 | 3.756 | 2.291 | 61% |
| 1897 | | 2.250 | |
| 1909 | 5.194 | 2.327 | 44.8% |
| 1921 | 4.073 | 2.536 | 57.6% |
| 2008 | 4.363 | | |

== Historic sites ==
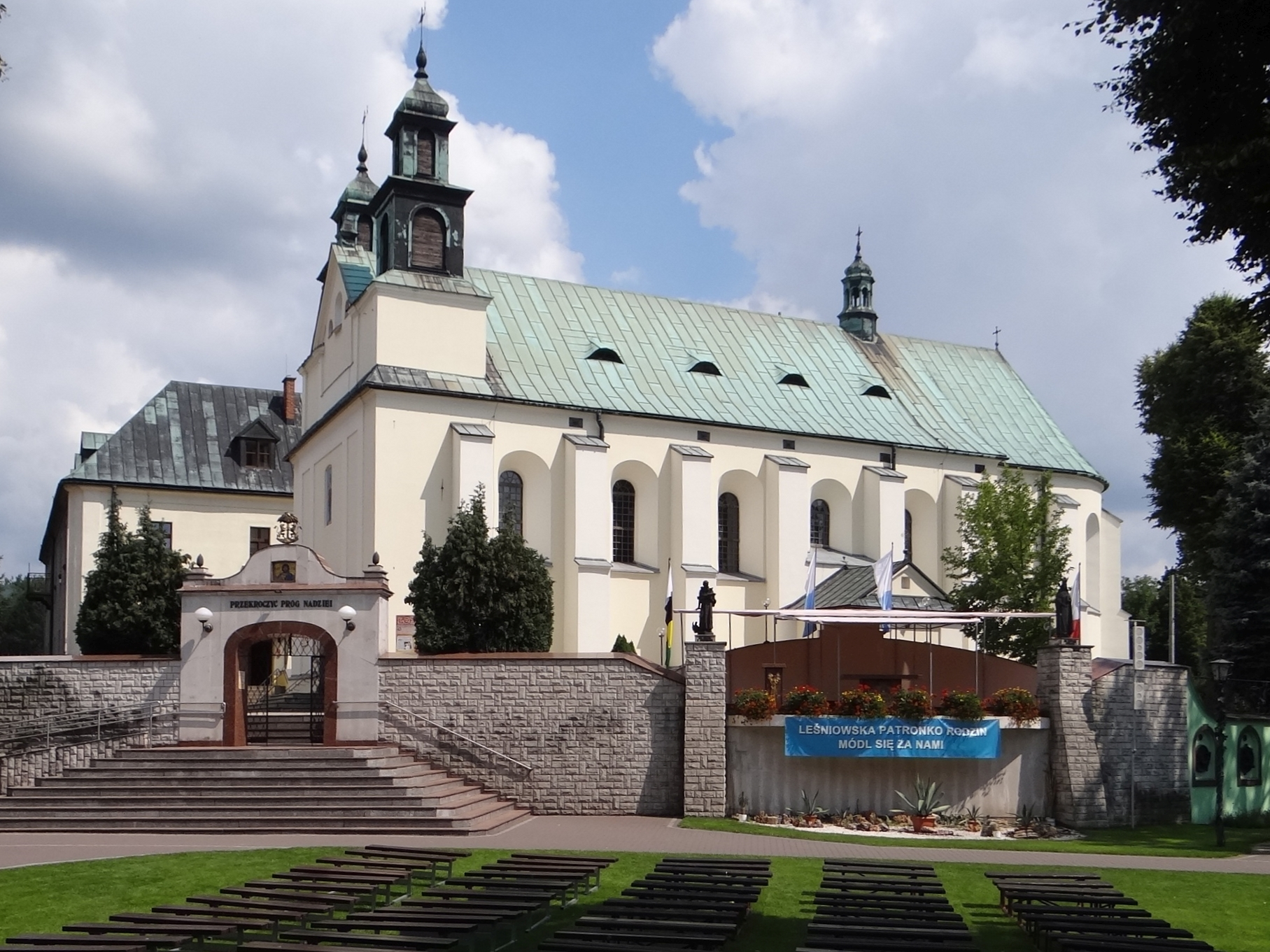
Sanctuary of Mary

Among local points of interest there are:

- Przewodziszowice Castle
- sanctuary of Mary, Patron Saint of Families,
- St. Simon and St. Jude church, built in 1522, and remodelled in the 17th century,
- wooden church of St. Barbara (17th century),
- ruins of an 18th-century manor house, with walls and tower,
- ruins of St. Stanislaus church (1782),
- new Jewish cemetery
