= Odrowąż, Radomsko County =

Odrowąż
- Village
- Location within Poland
- Coordinates: 51°0′38″N 19°42′26″E
- Country: Poland
- Voivodeship: Łódź
- County: Radomsko
- Gmina: Wielgomłyny
- Population: 110

Odrowąż [ɔˈdrɔvɔ̃ʂ] is a village in the administrative district of Gmina Wielgomłyny, within Radomsko County, Łódź Voivodeship, in central Poland.
