= Żegocina =

- Village
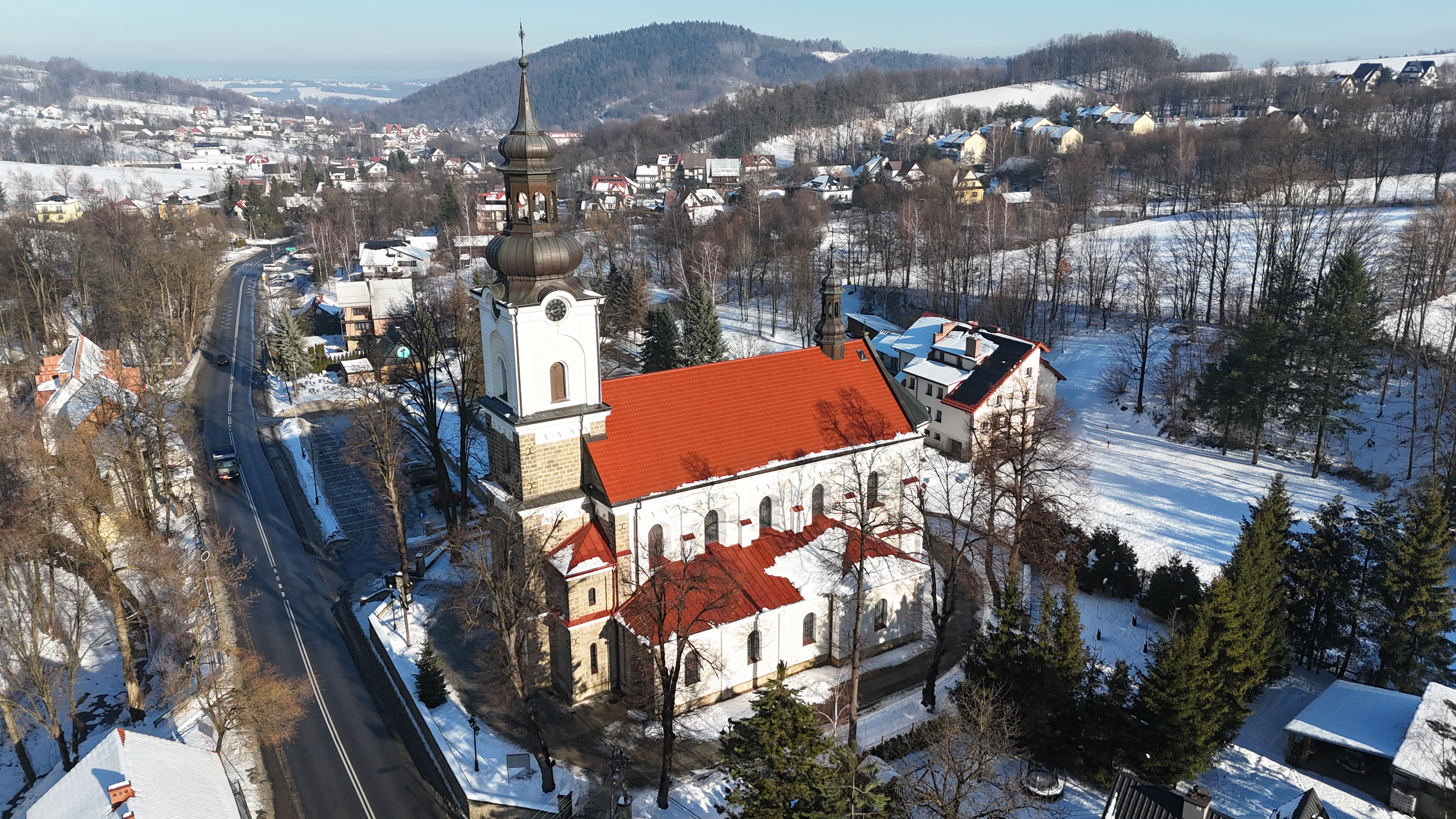
- Saint Nicholas Church

- Location within Poland
- Coordinates: 49°49′N 20°25′E
- Country: Poland
- Voivodeship: Lesser Poland
- County: Bochnia
- Gmina: Żegocina
- Population: 1,670
- Website: www.zegocina.pl (in Polish)

Żegocina [ʐɛɡɔˈt͡ɕina] is a village and sołectwo in Bochnia County, Lesser Poland Voivodeship, in southern Poland. It is the seat of the gmina (administrative district) called Gmina Żegocina.

== Origins ==
The settlement was founded by Wierzbięta in the 12th century. A church was established in 1293 by the knight Zbigniew Żegota, of the clan Topór.
