= Leszczyna =

Leszczyna may refer to:

- Leszczyna, Lower Silesian Voivodeship, Poland, in the south-west
- Leszczyna, Lublin Voivodeship, Poland, in the east
- Leszczyna, Lesser Poland Voivodeship, Poland, in the south
- Leszczyna, Masovian Voivodeship, Poland, in the east-central
- Leszczyna, Warmian-Masurian Voivodeship, Poland, in the north
