= Krosna (disambiguation) =

Krosna may refer to:

- Krosna, Lithuania
- Krosna, Poland
- Krosna-Wieś, Poland
