= Devil's Stone in Trzciana =

Rock formation in Poland

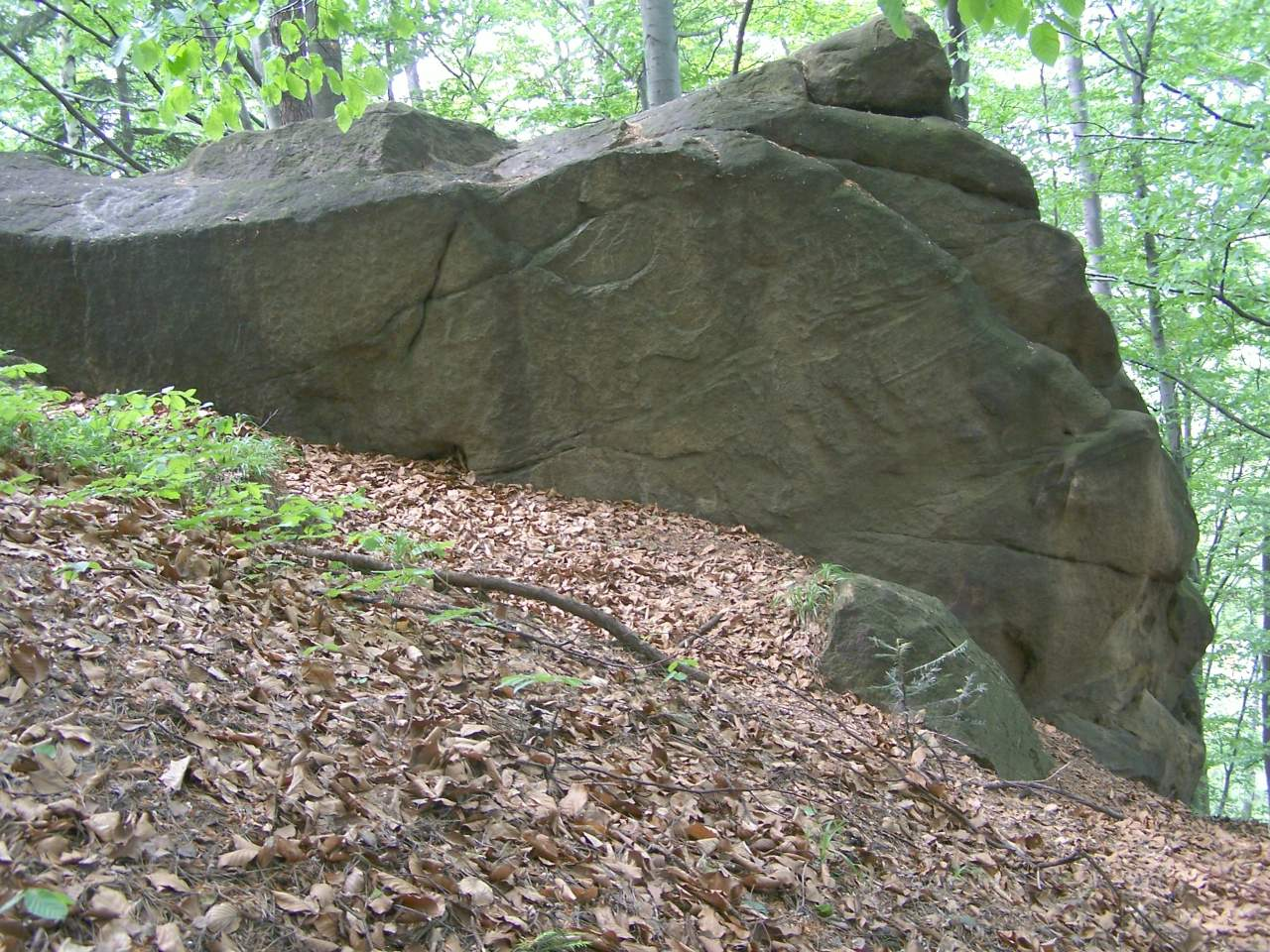
Devil's Stone in Trzciana

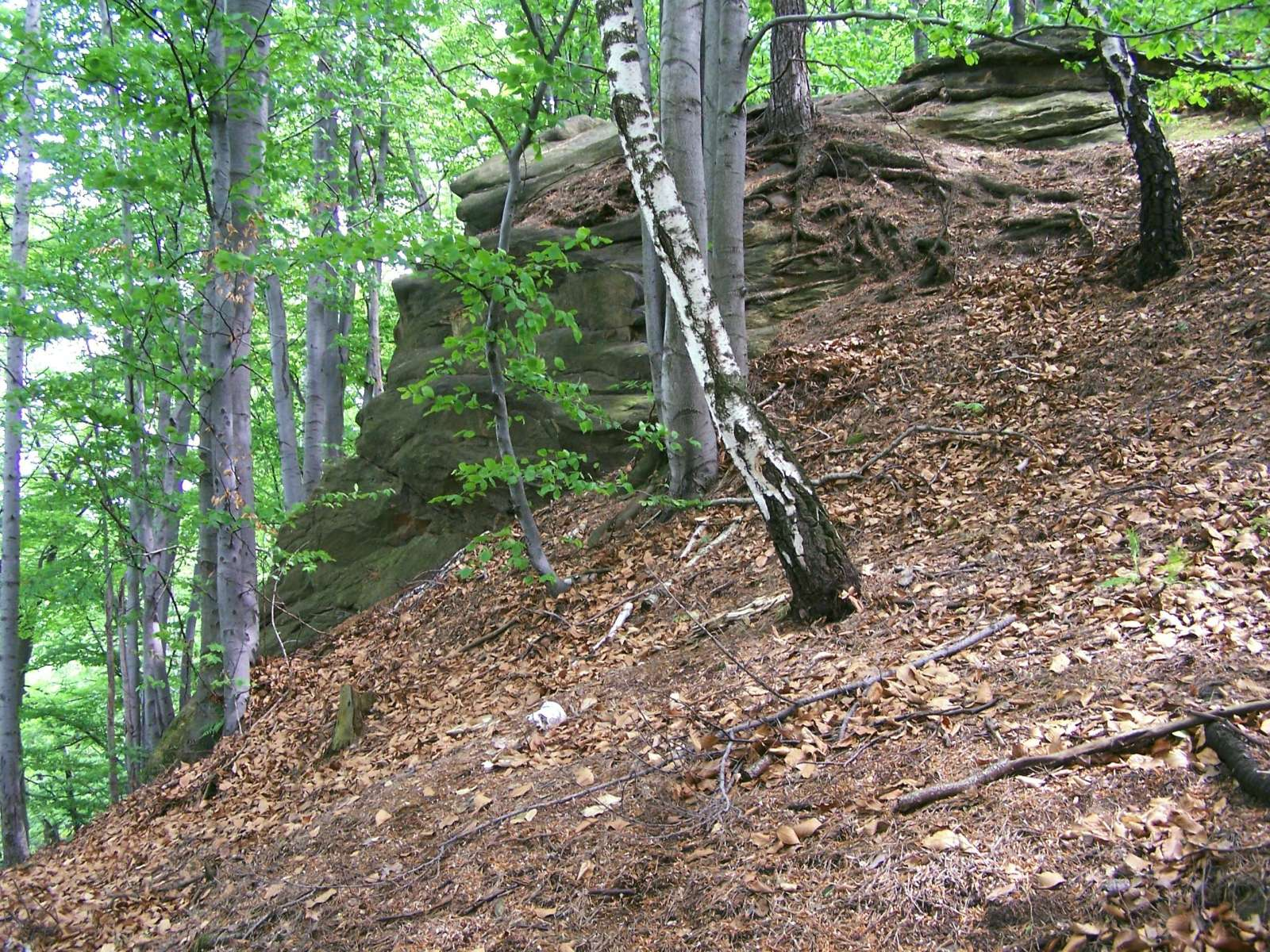
Devil's Stone in Trzciana

Devil's Stone in Trzciana (Polish: Diabelski Kamień w Trzcianie) – a rock formation in the Wiśnicki Foothills, located on the northern slopes of the Cichawka stream ravine, on the Wichraż hill (approx. 320 m above sea level). Built of sandstone, it reaches a height of 12 m and a length of 20 m. It is located in a beech and fir forest with protected plants and a spotted salamander. The site is associated with the legend of the White Lady and the devil who dropped the boulder. It is a walking point with a view of the Beskid Wyspowy.

== See also ==
- Trzciana, Lesser Poland Voivodeship
