= Bytomsko =

- Village
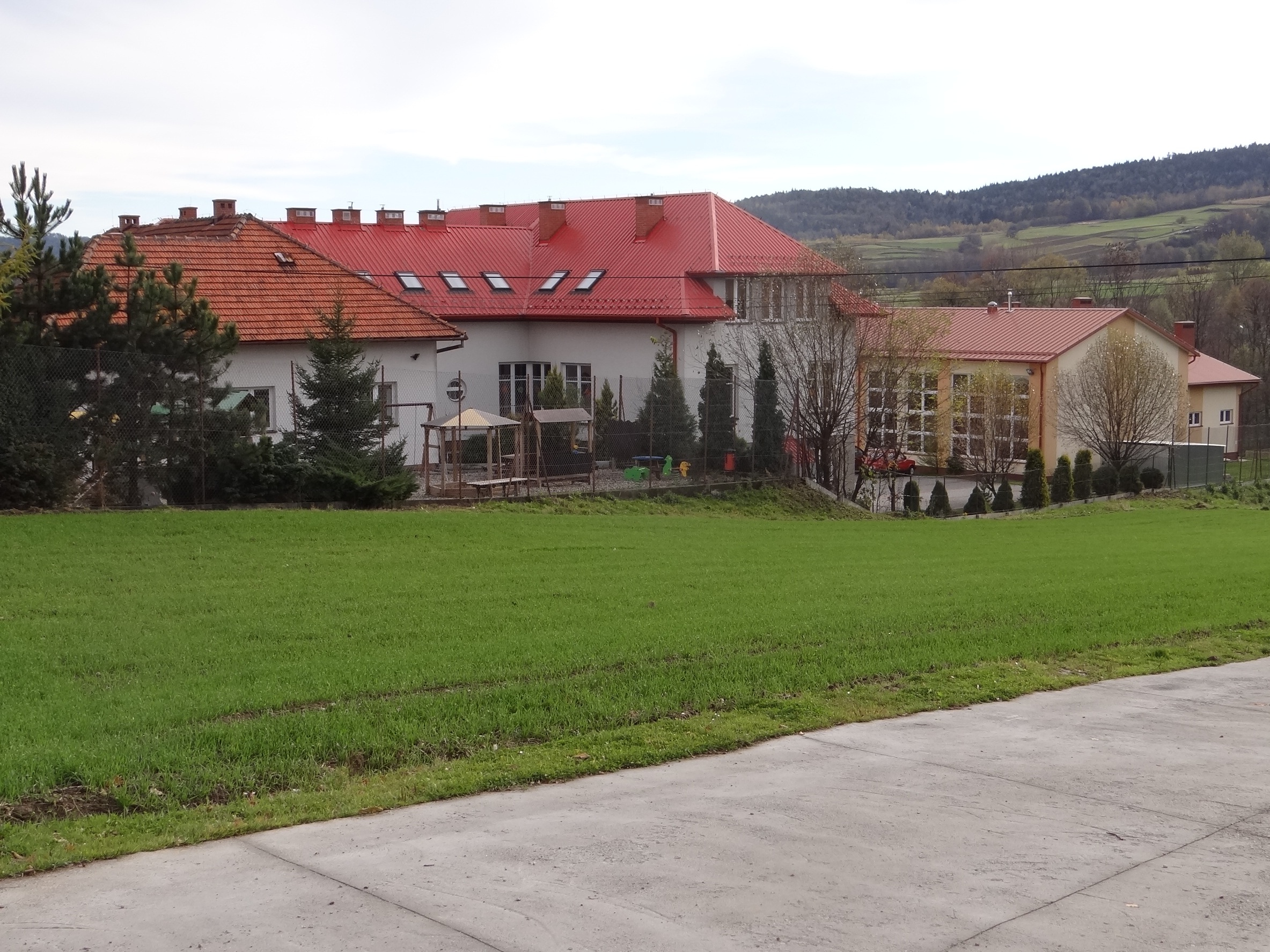
- School

- Location within Poland
- Coordinates: 49°49′N 20°27′E
- Country: Poland
- Voivodeship: Lesser Poland
- County: Bochnia
- Gmina: Żegocina
- Area: 5.38 km^{2} (2.08 sq mi)
- Elevation: 381 m (1,250 ft)
- Population: 664
- Website: www.zegocina.pl (in Polish)

Bytomsko [bɨˈtɔmskɔ] is a village and sołectwo in the administrative district of Gmina Żegocina, within Bochnia County, Lesser Poland Voivodeship, in southern Poland.
