= Trzciana, Lesser Poland Voivodeship =

Trzciana
- Village
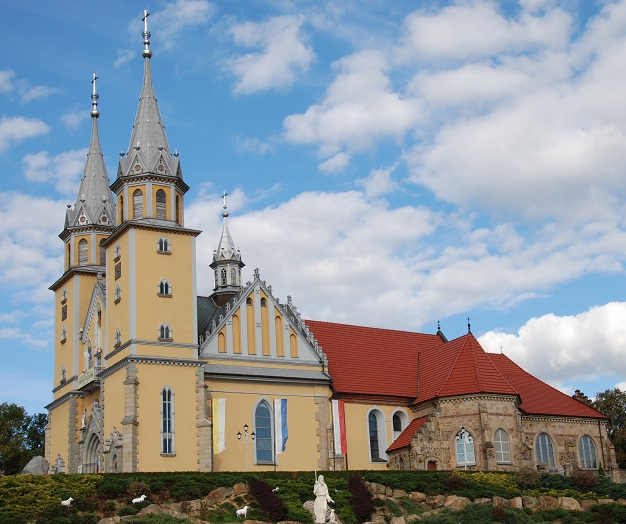
- Saint Margaret of Antioch church

- Location within Poland
- Coordinates: 49°50′44″N 20°22′17″E
- Country: Poland
- Voivodeship: Lesser Poland
- County: Bochnia
- Gmina: Trzciana
- Highest elevation: 364 m (1,194 ft)
- Lowest elevation: 227 m (745 ft)

Population
  - Total: 1,462
- Time zone: UTC+1 (CET)
  - Summer (DST): UTC+2 (CEST)
- Vehicle registration: KBC

Trzciana [ˈtʂt͡ɕana] is a village in Bochnia County, Lesser Poland Voivodeship, in southern Poland. It is the seat of the gmina (administrative district) called Gmina Trzciana.

Town rights were granted in 1785 and revoked in 1896.

== Points of interest ==
- Devil's Stone in Trzciana, a rock formation in the Wiśnicki Foothills
