= Gmina Żegocina =

Gmina Żegocina Żegocina Commune
- Gmina
- Flag Coat of arms
- Interactive map of Gmina Żegocina
- Coordinates (Żegocina): 49°48′N 20°26′E
- Country: Poland
- Voivodeship: Lesser Poland
- County: Bochnia
- Seat: Żegocina

Area
  - Total: 35.23 km^{2} (13.60 sq mi)

Population (2008)
  - Total: 5,069
  - Density: 143.9/km^{2} (372.7/sq mi)
- Website: http://www.zegocina.pl (in Polish)

Gmina Żegocina is a rural gmina (administrative district) in Bochnia County, Lesser Poland Voivodeship, in southern Poland. Its seat is the village of Żegocina, which lies approximately 21 kilometres (13 mi) south of Bochnia and 46 km (29 mi) south-east of the regional capital Kraków.

The gmina covers an area of 35.23 square kilometres (13.6 sq mi), and as of 31 December 2008 its total population was 5069.

== Villages ==
Gmina Żegocina is made up of the sołectwos of the villages of Bełdno, Bytomsko, Łąkta Górna, Rozdziele and Żegocina.

== Neighbouring gminas ==
Gmina Żegocina is bordered by the town of Bochnia and by the gminas of Laskowa, Lipnica Murowana, Nowy Wiśnicz and Trzciana.
