= Kierlikówka =

- Village
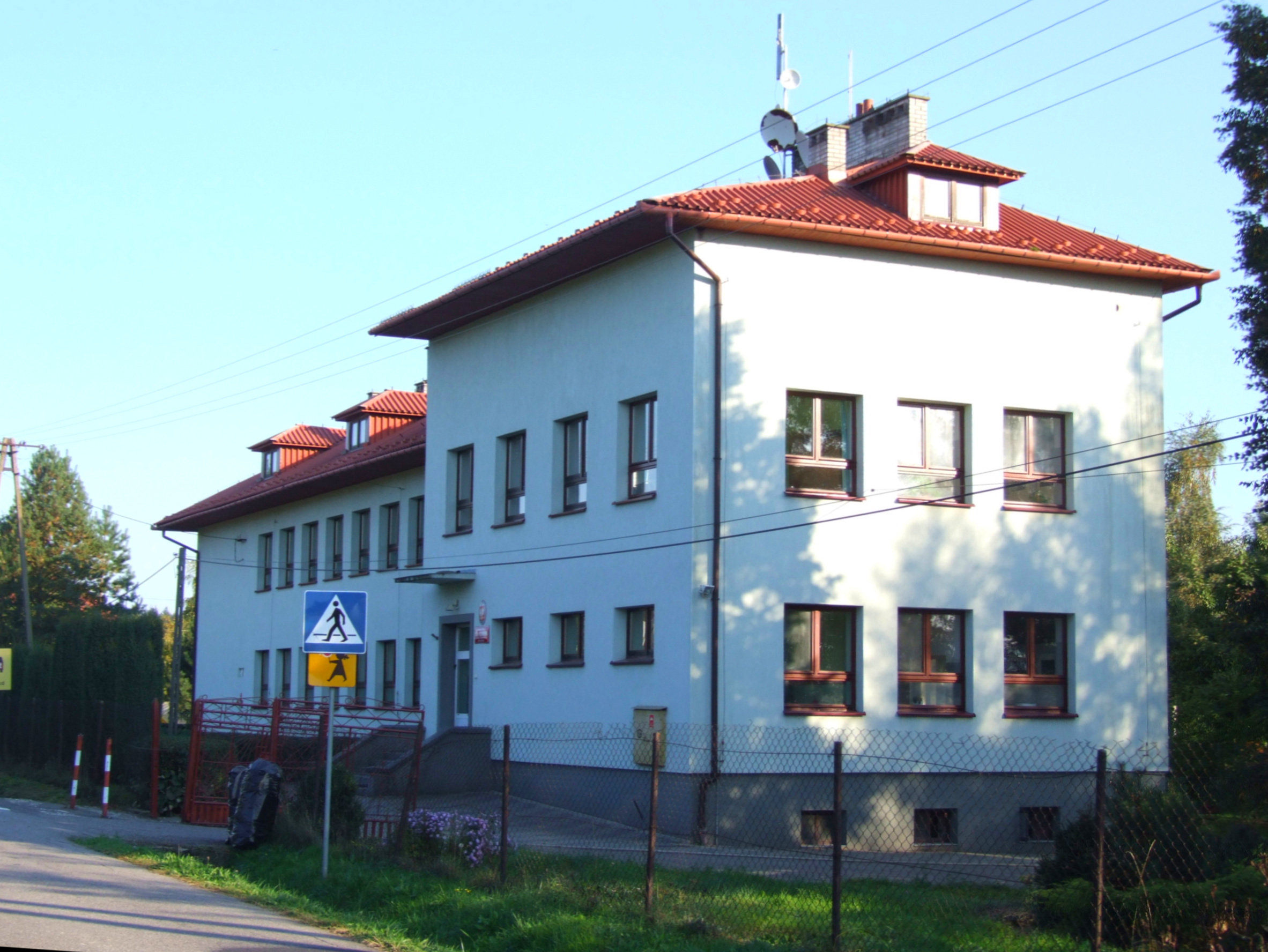
- School

- Location within Poland
- Coordinates: 49°49′15″N 20°23′0″E
- Country: Poland
- Voivodeship: Lesser Poland
- County: Bochnia
- Gmina: Trzciana

Kierlikówka [kʲɛrliˈkufka] is a village in the administrative district of Gmina Trzciana, within Bochnia County, Lesser Poland Voivodeship, in southern Poland.
