= Jaworzna =

- Village
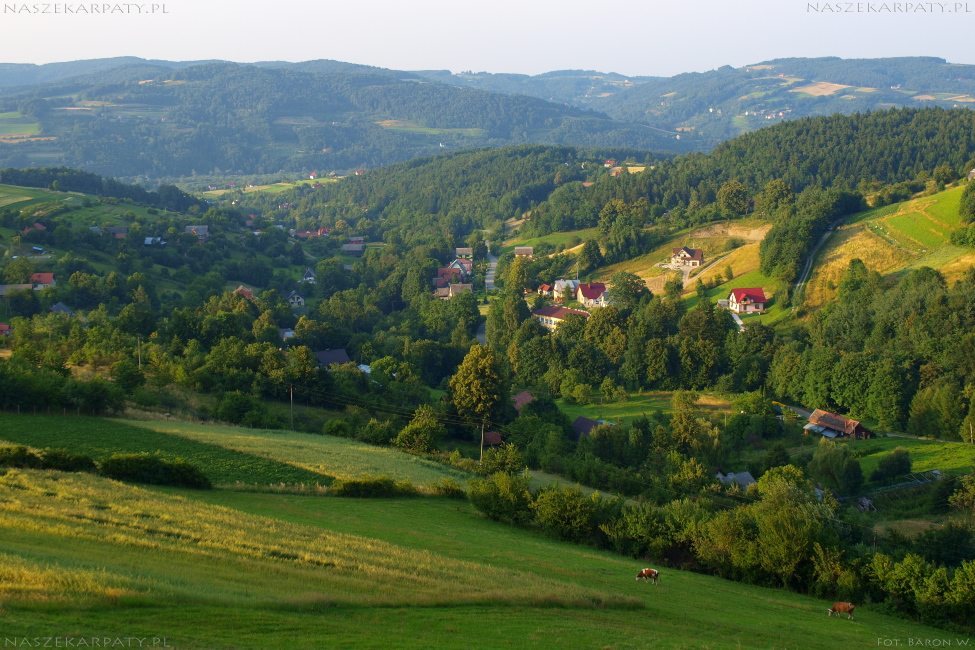
- Jaworzna, view of the village.

- Location within Poland
- Coordinates: 49°45′03″N 20°29′38″E
- Country: Poland
- Voivodeship: Lesser Poland
- County: Limanowa
- Gmina: Laskowa
- Population: 550

Jaworzna [jaˈvɔʐna] is a village in the administrative district of Gmina Laskowa, within Limanowa County, Lesser Poland Voivodeship, in southern Poland.
