= Żmiąca =

- Village
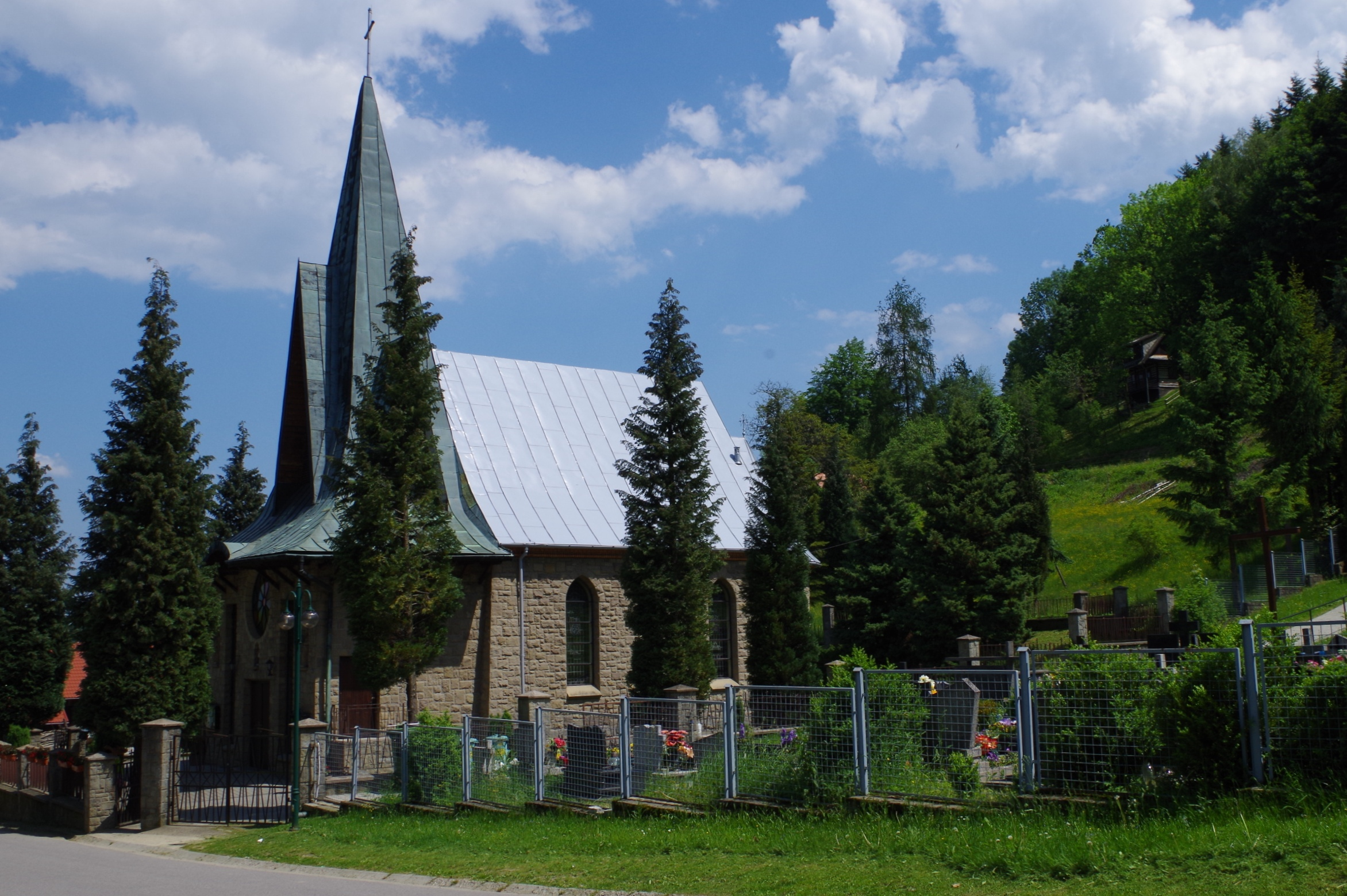
- Church of the Sacred Heart

- Location within Poland
- Coordinates: 49°45′N 20°31′E
- Country: Poland
- Voivodeship: Lesser Poland
- County: Limanowa
- Gmina: Laskowa

Population
  - Total: 704

Żmiąca [ˈʐmjɔnt͡sa] is a village in the administrative district of Gmina Laskowa, within Limanowa County, Lesser Poland Voivodeship, in southern Poland.
