= Ujazd, Bochnia County =

Ujazd
- Village
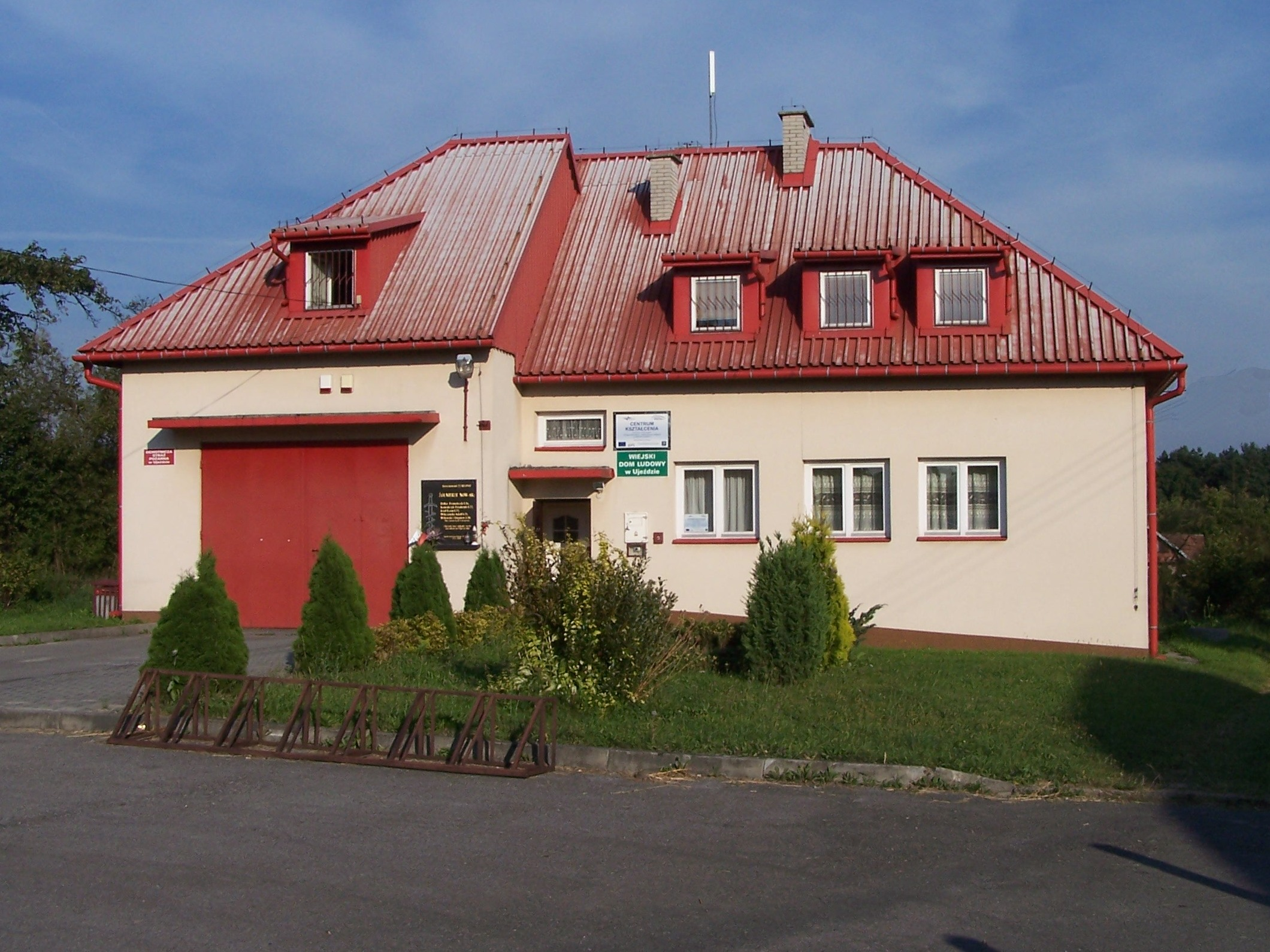

- Location within Poland
- Coordinates: 49°50′10″N 20°20′52″E
- Country: Poland
- Voivodeship: Lesser Poland
- County: Bochnia
- Gmina: Trzciana
- Population: 340

Ujazd [ˈujast] is a village in the administrative district of Gmina Trzciana, within Bochnia County, Lesser Poland Voivodeship, in southern Poland.
