= Bełdno =

- Village
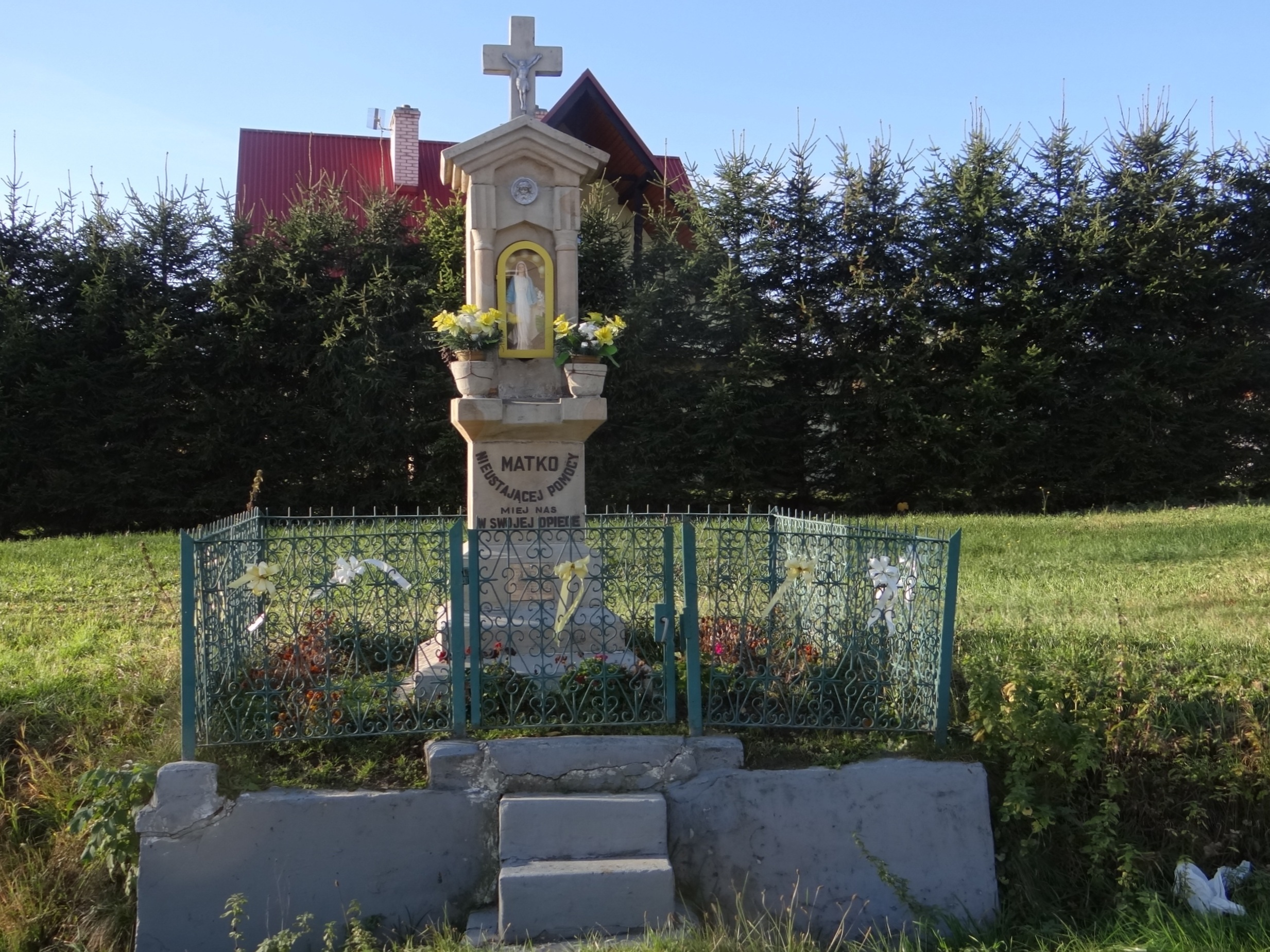
- Chapel

- Location within Poland
- Coordinates: 49°49′30″N 20°24′0″E
- Country: Poland
- Voivodeship: Lesser Poland
- County: Bochnia
- Gmina: Żegocina
- Population: 273
- Website: www.zegocina.pl (in Polish)

Bełdno [ˈbɛwdnɔ] is a village and sołectwo in the administrative district of Gmina Żegocina, within Bochnia County, Lesser Poland Voivodeship, in southern Poland.

== Origins ==
The village was established in 1398 according to the Magdeburg rights. These days it is the smallest of the subdivisions of the gmina.

== Shrine ==
By the road to Żegocina there is a wayside shrine to Our Lady of Perpetual Succour. It contains a statue of the Virgin that was rescued from the main hall of Kraków station during the upheavals of September 1939.
