= Laskowa, Limanowa County =

Laskowa
- Village
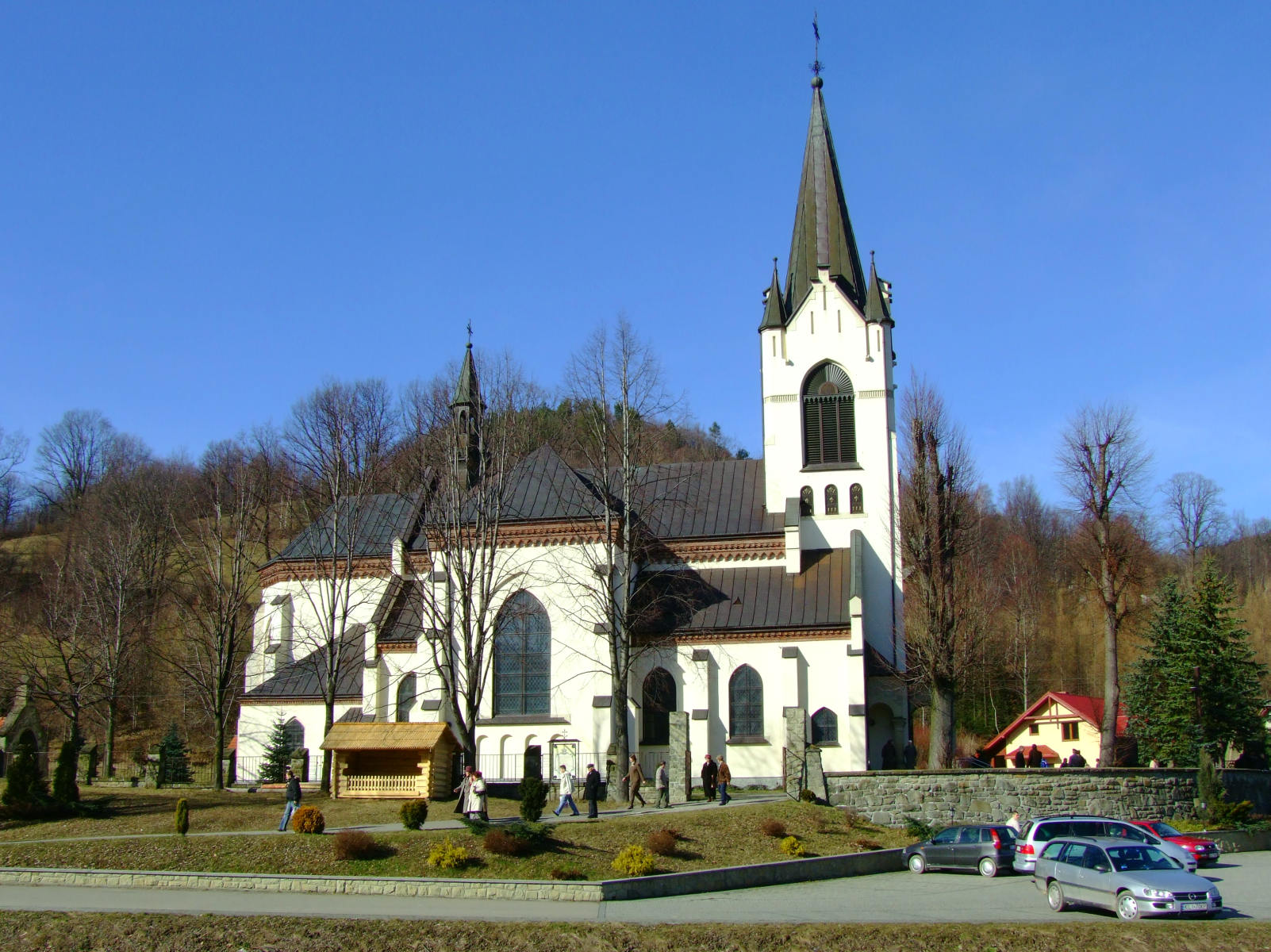
- Church of the Holy Name of Mary

- Location within Poland
- Coordinates: 49°45′46″N 20°27′8″E
- Country: Poland
- Voivodeship: Lesser Poland
- County: Limanowa
- Gmina: Laskowa
- Highest elevation: 760 m (2,490 ft)
- Lowest elevation: 340 m (1,120 ft)

Population
  - Total: 3,140
- Postal code: 34-602

Laskowa [lasˈkɔva] is a village in Limanowa County, Lesser Poland Voivodeship, in southern Poland. It is the seat of the gmina (administrative district) called Gmina Laskowa.

== Name ==
A local tale suggests that a king and his people found a hazel forest here, and he ordered the village to be built, calling it "wieś Laskowa" literally village of hazel.

Laskowa is a feminine noun, that sounds like adjective, means something related to:

- Polish "laska" literally stick (as in e.g. walking stick, stick of rock, or stick of dynamite) or gal.
- Polish "laskowy orzech" literally hazelnut.

== History ==
Laskowa was a possession of the Congregation of the Mission from Kraków.

Following the German-Soviet invasion of Poland, which started World War II in September 1939, the village was occupied by Germany until 1945. The Polish resistance was present in the area. In 1944 the Peasant Battalions seized grain from a local storehouse as part of a nationwide effort to prevent the Germans from shipping food out of Poland.

== Tourism ==
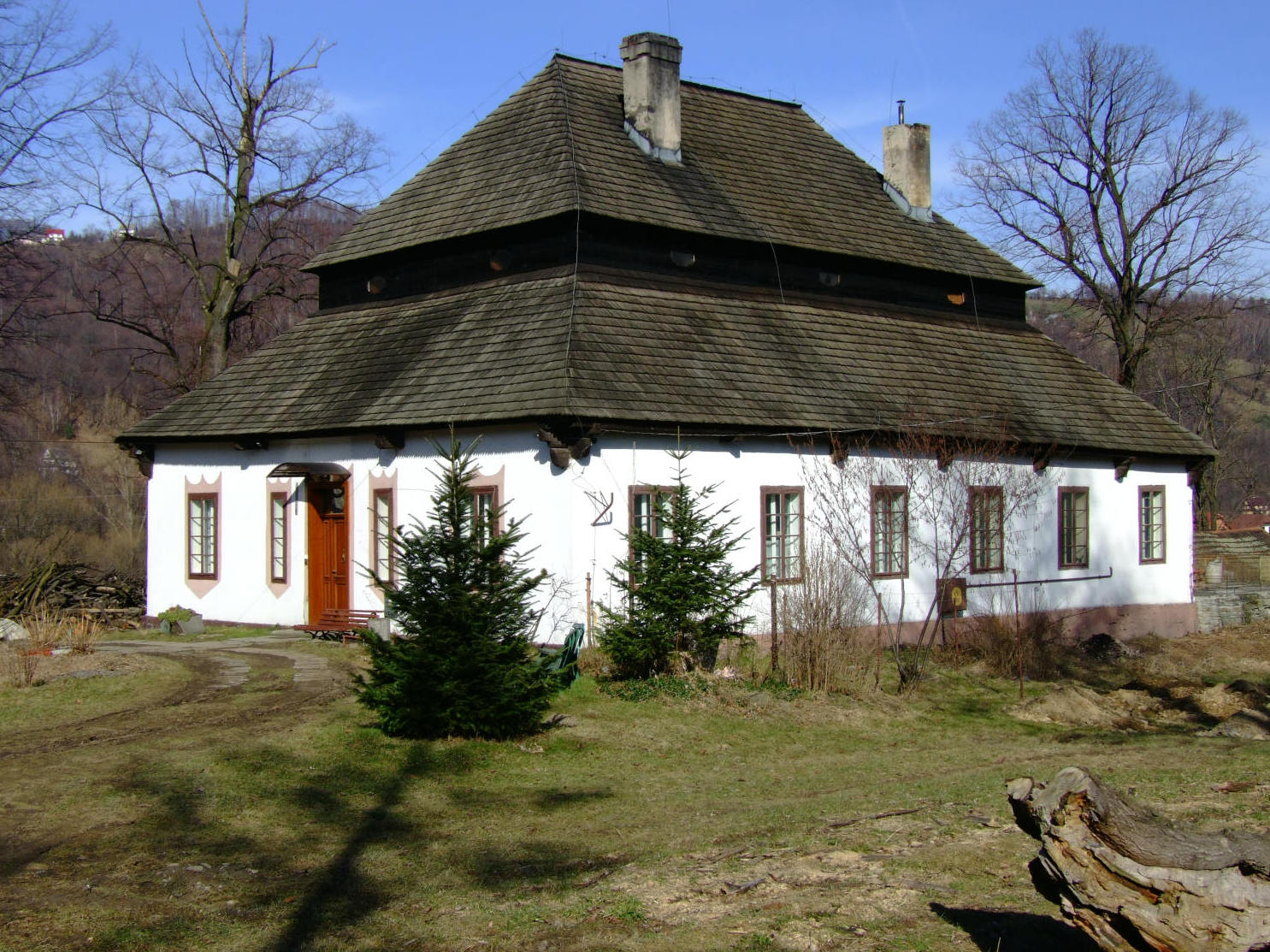
Historic small manor house from the 18th century

- Marked trails of Island Beskids
- Three hotels
- T-bar lift
- Chair lift

== People connected with Laskowa ==
- Józef Joniec, Polish Roman Catholic priest - born in Laskowa
- Pat Sajak, American television personality - his paternal grandfather was born in Laskowa
