= Kobyłczyna =

- Village
- Location within Poland
- Coordinates: 49°45′N 20°34′E
- Country: Poland
- Voivodeship: Lesser Poland
- County: Limanowa
- Gmina: Laskowa

Kobyłczyna [kɔbɨu̯ˈt͡ʂɨna] is a village in the administrative district of Gmina Laskowa, within Limanowa County, Lesser Poland Voivodeship, in southern Poland.
