= Łąkta Górna =

- Village
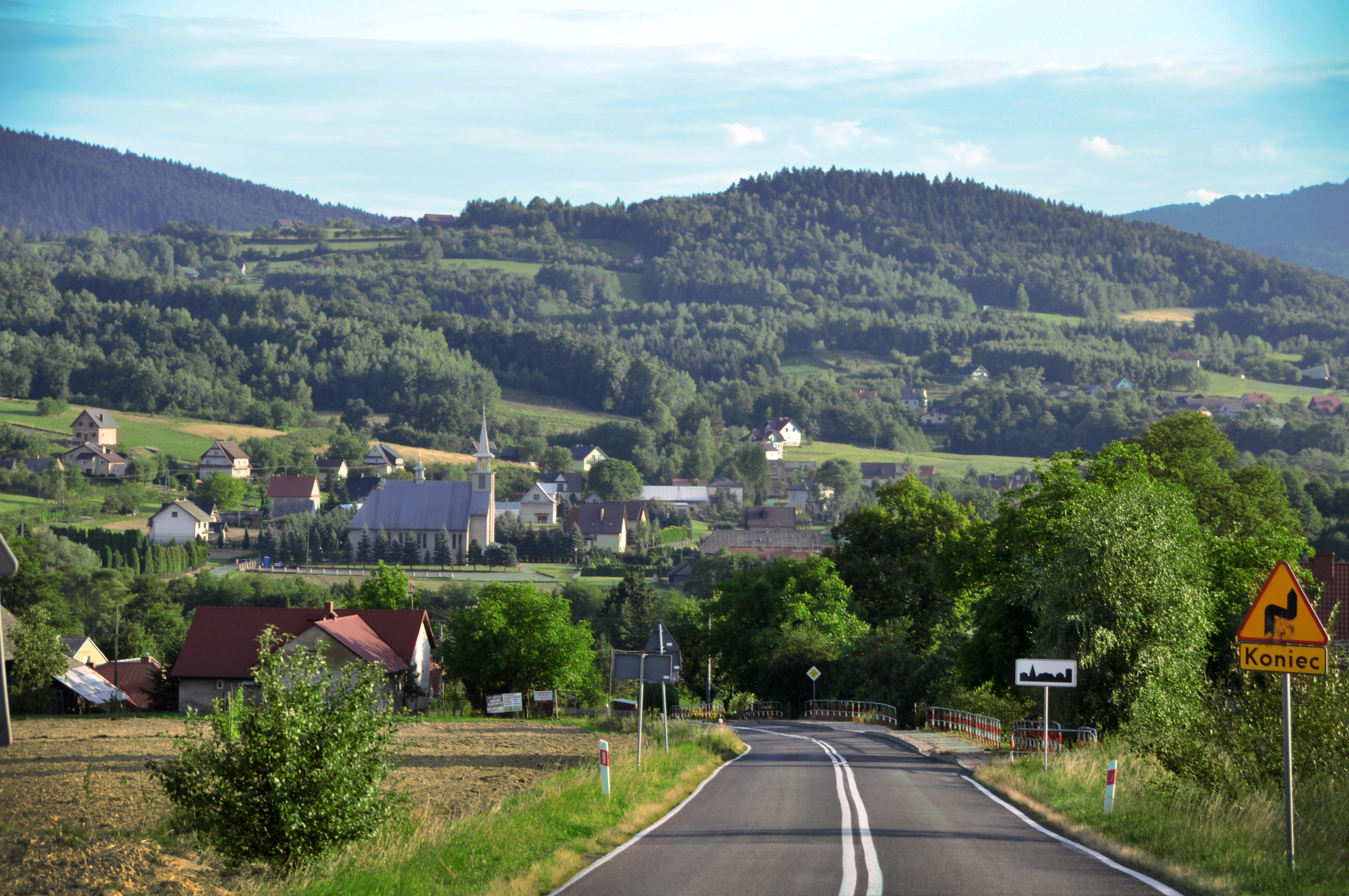
- North side view of village

- Location within Poland
- Coordinates: 49°50′N 20°26′E
- Country: Poland
- Voivodeship: Lesser Poland
- County: Bochnia
- Gmina: Żegocina
- Elevation: 457 m (1,499 ft)
- Population: 1,505
- Website: www.zegocina.pl (in Polish)

Łąkta Górna [ˈwɔ̃kta ˈɡurna] is a village and sołectwo in the administrative district of Gmina Żegocina, within Bochnia County, Lesser Poland Voivodeship, in southern Poland.
