= Łąkta Dolna =

- Village
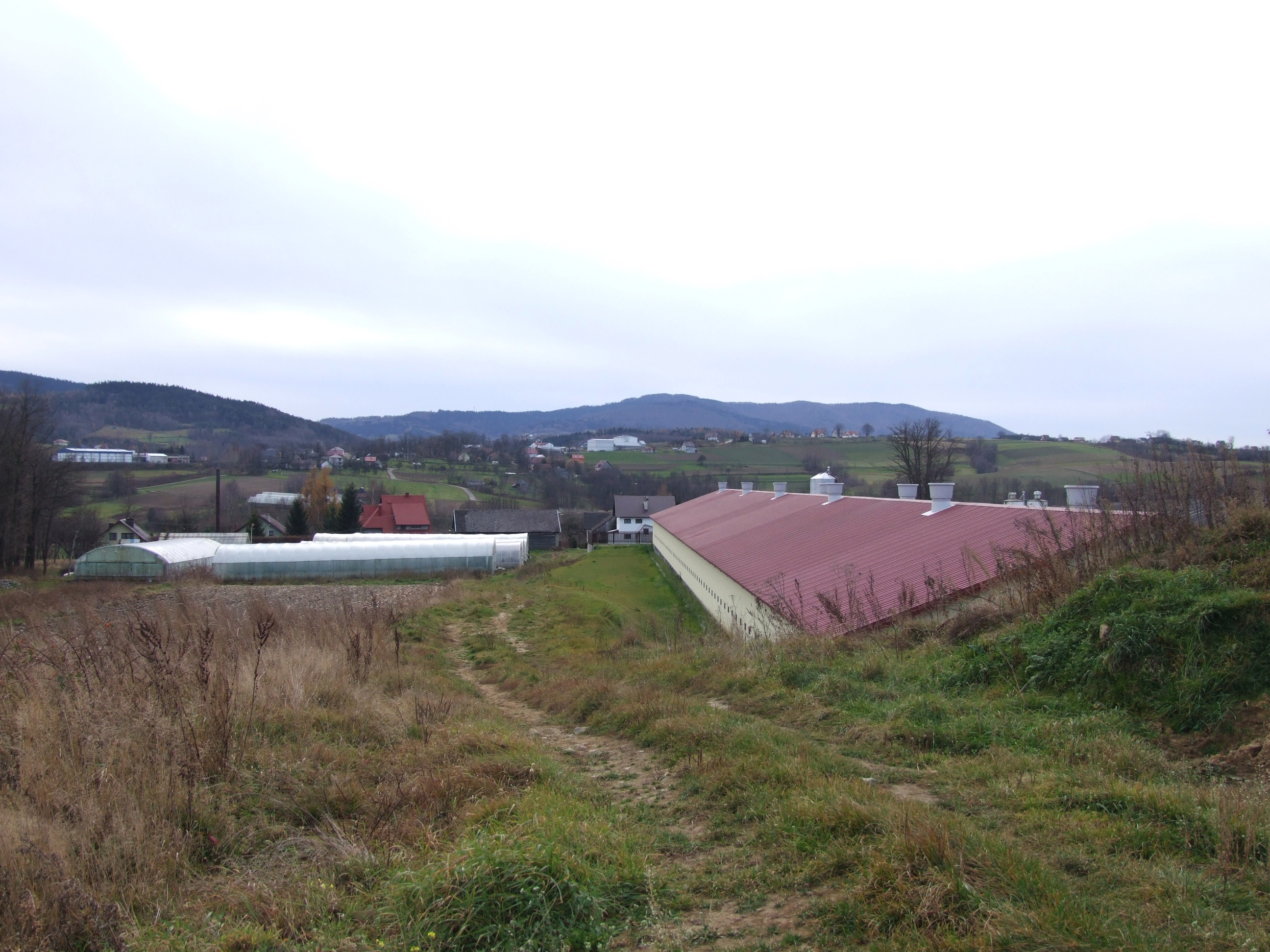

- Location within Poland
- Coordinates: 49°50′22″N 20°24′2″E
- Country: Poland
- Voivodeship: Lesser Poland
- County: Bochnia
- Gmina: Trzciana
- Population: 940

Łąkta Dolna [ˈwɔnkta ˈdɔlna] is a village in the administrative district of Gmina Trzciana, within Bochnia County, Lesser Poland Voivodeship, in southern Poland.
