= Kamionka Mała, Limanowa County =

Kamionka Mała
- Village
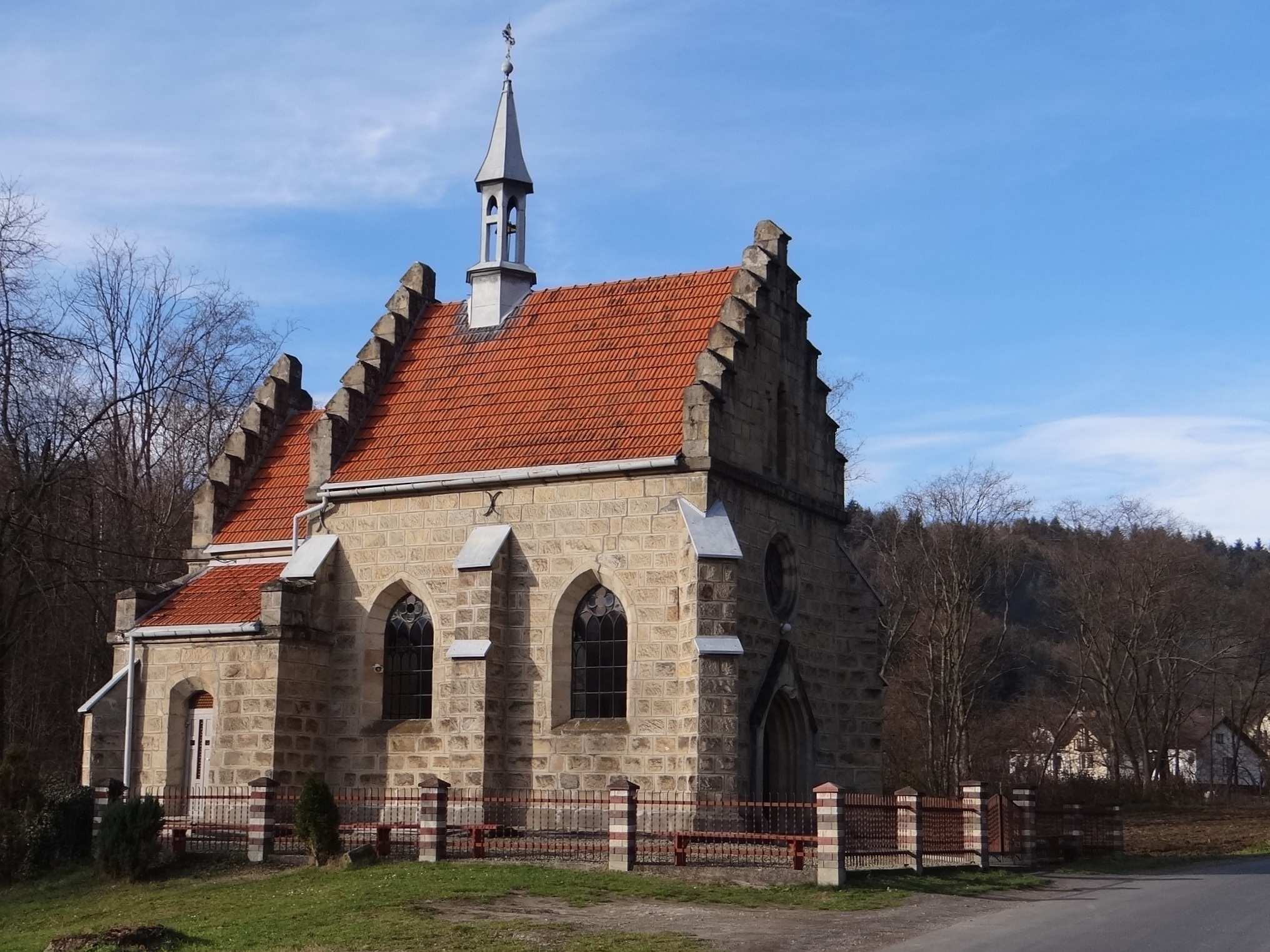
- Chapel of Our Lady of the Scapular

- Location within Poland
- Coordinates: 49°46′58″N 20°30′11″E
- Country: Poland
- Voivodeship: Lesser Poland
- County: Limanowa
- Gmina: Laskowa

Population
  - Total: 680

Kamionka Mała [kaˈmjɔnka ˈmawa] is a village in the administrative district of Gmina Laskowa, within Limanowa County, Lesser Poland Voivodeship, in southern Poland.
