= Gmina Trzciana =

Gmina Trzciana Trzciana Commune
- Gmina
- Coat of arms
- Interactive map of Gmina Trzciana
- Coordinates (Trzciana): 49°51′N 20°22′E
- Country: Poland
- Voivodeship: Lesser Poland
- County: Bochnia
- Seat: Trzciana

Area
  - Total: 44.09 km^{2} (17.02 sq mi)

Population (2006)
  - Total: 5,044
  - Density: 114.4/km^{2} (296.3/sq mi)
- Website: http://www.trzciana.pl

Gmina Trzciana is a rural gmina (administrative district) in Bochnia County, Lesser Poland Voivodeship, in southern Poland. Its seat is the village of Trzciana, which lies approximately 16 kilometres (10 mi) south of Bochnia and 39 km (24 mi) south-east of the regional capital Kraków.

The gmina covers an area of 44.09 square kilometres (17.0 sq mi), and as of 2006 its total population is 5,044.

== Villages ==
Gmina Trzciana contains the villages and settlements of Kamionna, Kierlikówka, Łąkta Dolna, Leszczyna, Rdzawa, Trzciana and Ujazd.

== Neighbouring gminas ==
Gmina Trzciana is bordered by the gminas of Łapanów, Limanowa, Nowy Wiśnicz and Żegocina.
