= Rozdziele, Bochnia County =

Rozdziele
- Village
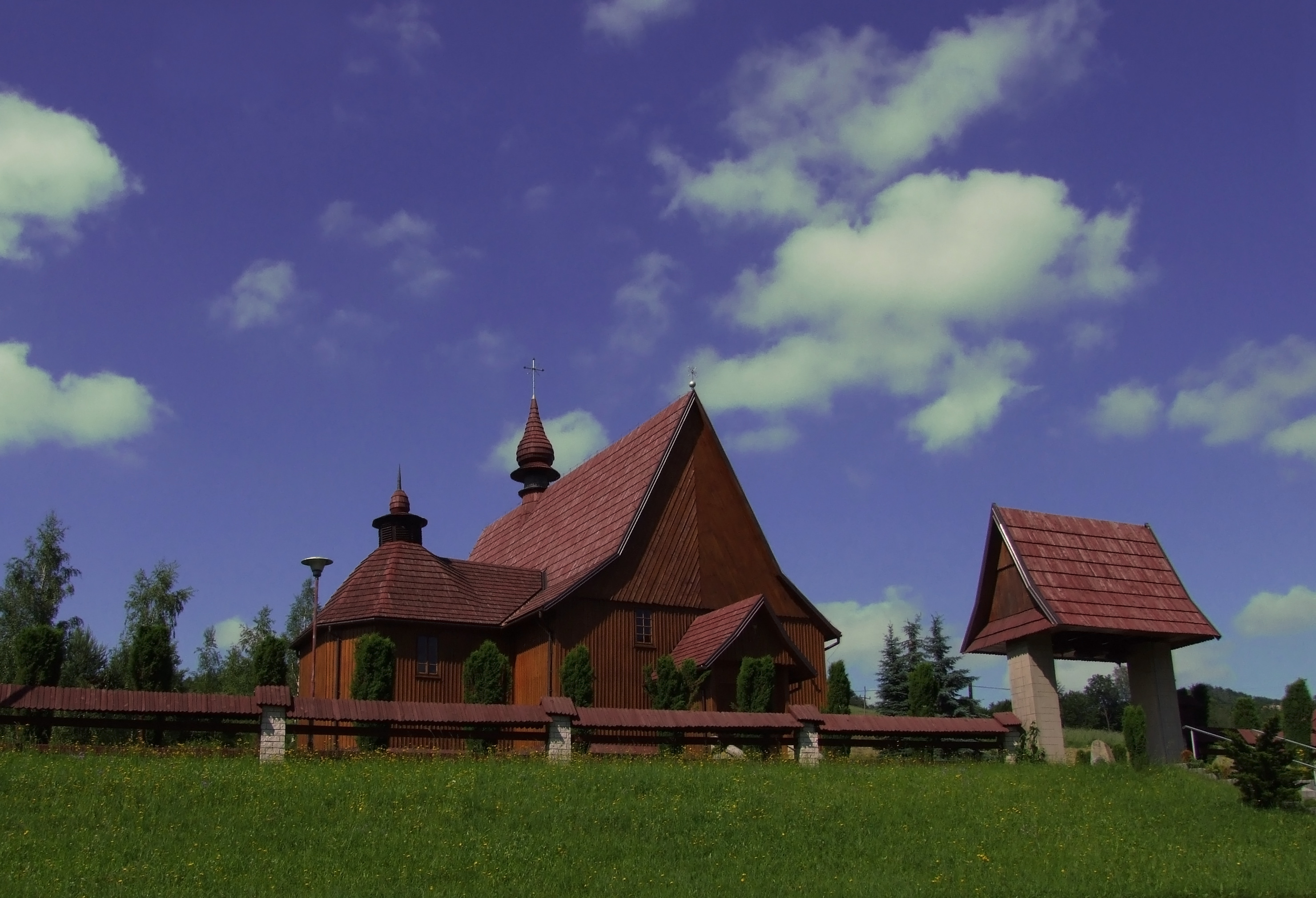
- Church

- Location within Poland
- Coordinates: 49°48′N 20°27′E
- Country: Poland
- Voivodeship: Lesser Poland
- County: Bochnia
- Gmina: Żegocina
- Population: 892
- Website: www.zegocina.pl (in Polish)

Rozdziele [rɔzˈd͡ʑɛlɛ] is a village and sołectwo in the administrative district of Gmina Żegocina, within Bochnia County, Lesser Poland Voivodeship, in southern Poland.

== Origins ==
The name Rozdziele indicates the idea of division and relates to the area being on the drainage divide between the Raba and Dunajec rivers. The earliest mention of the name occurs in 1262, in a grant of forest rights from king Bolesław V the Chaste, though there is no indication as to whether a settlement with that name existed then. The first definite mention of Rozdziele as a village does not occur until 1490.

Rozdziele is divided into two hamlets: Lower Rozdziele (Dolne Rozdziele) and Upper Rozdziele (Górne Rozdziele).

The centre of the village is in Lower Rozdziele, where is the church, cemetery, tourist hostel, the depot and shops. It lies downhill towards the East. In Upper Rozdziele there is a school.

In 2002 in Rozdziele the plane crashed. Four people died.

== Economy ==
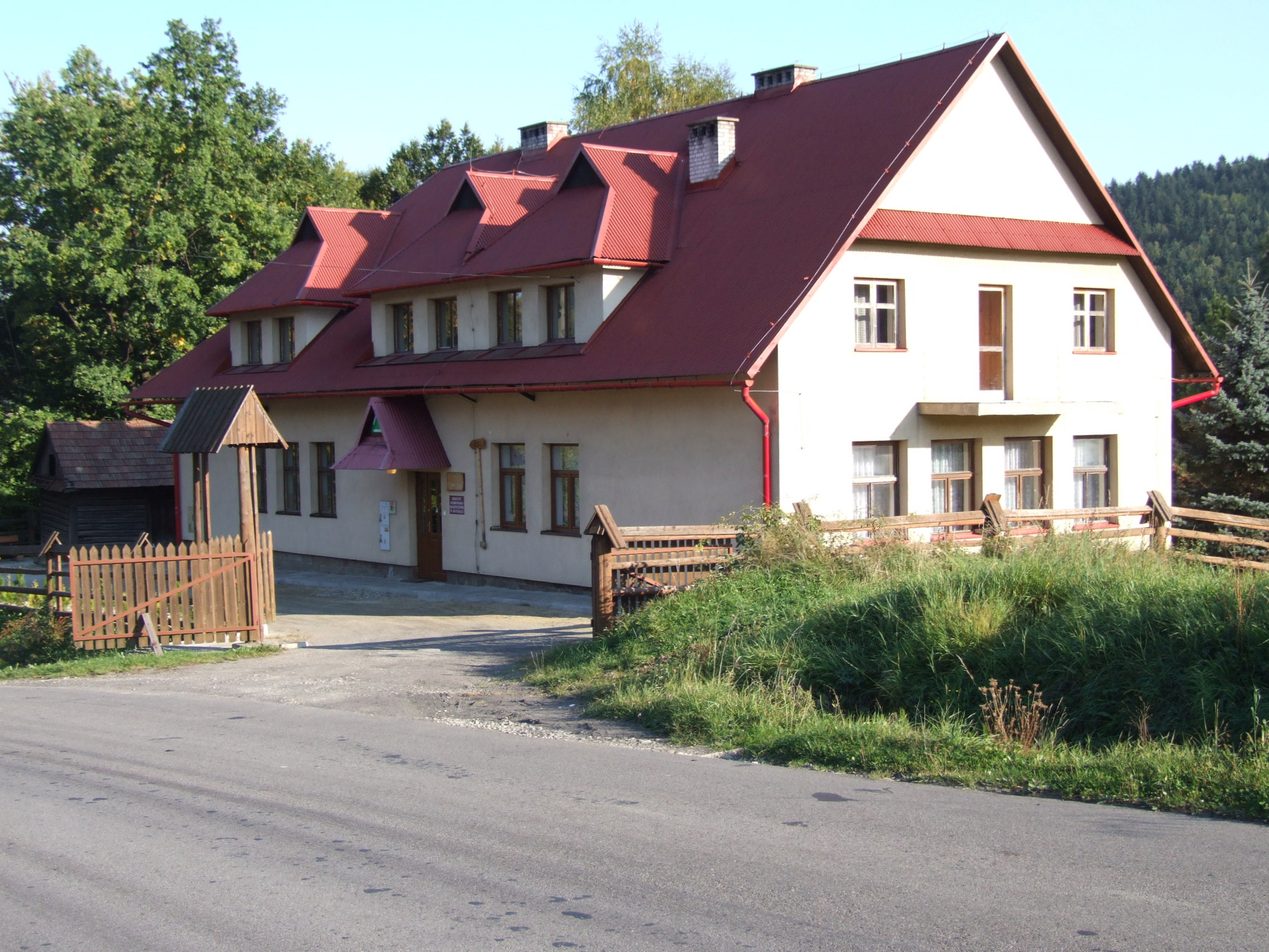
Tourist hostel in Rozdziele

These days the local economy centres around agriculture and, increasingly, tourism, given the village's location amongst hills and unspoilt Country side. In this village is two hotels: "Bacówka nad Wilczy Rynkiem" and tourists hostel PTSM.

== Religion ==
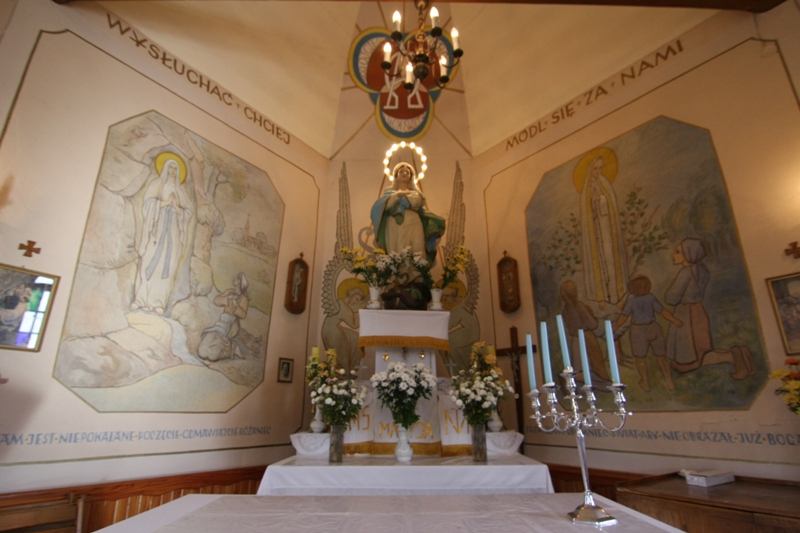
The sculpture Our Lady of Rozdziele in chapel

In this village is a historic Roman Catholic church dedicated to St. James the Apostle it is subsidiary to the parish church in Żegocina. Of wooden construction, typical of this part of Poland, the building dates back to the 15th century, and originally stood in Królówka. It was renovated from the funds of Zygmunt August - the king of Poland. In this church stayed King of Poland - Władysław IV. It was transported to its current location in 1986. The building is on the Wooden Architecture Trail.

In Rozdziele is wooden chapel from 1958. It was built thanks to the priest Michał Krawczyk from Kamionka Mała. In altar in this chapel is famous for favors sculpture Our Lady from 1846. It was built by a nobleman who survived during the rebellion in Galicia. Chapel is called Under limee tree (Pod lipami) because next to it grow this trees.

== See also ==
- Wooden Churches of Southern Little Poland
