= Kamionna, Lesser Poland Voivodeship =

Kamionna
- Village
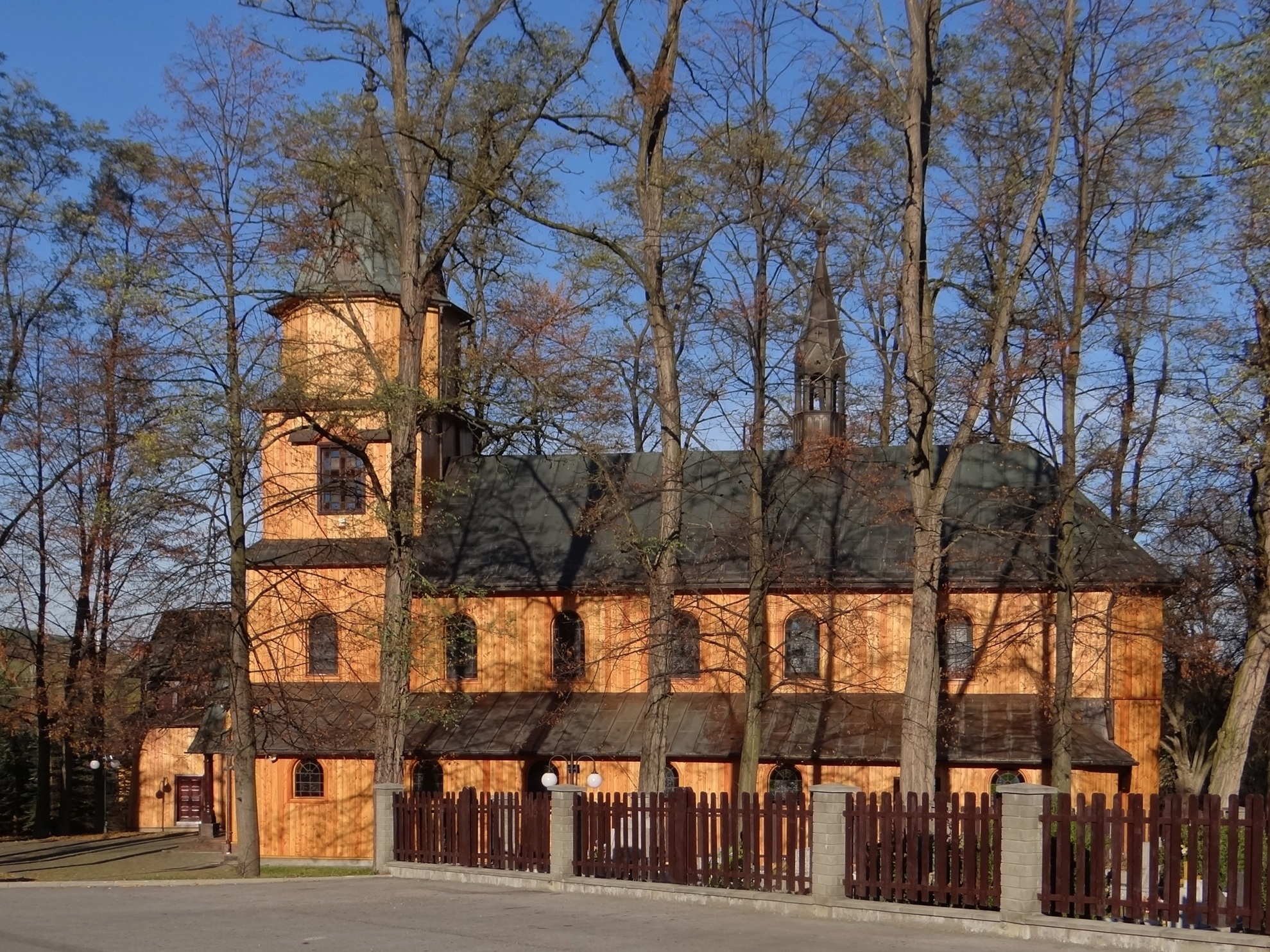
- Virgin Mary Queen of Poland church

- Location within Poland
- Coordinates: 49°48′36″N 20°22′1″E
- Country: Poland
- Voivodeship: Lesser Poland
- County: Bochnia
- Gmina: Trzciana
- Population: 770
- Website: http://www.kamionna.up.pl/

Kamionna [kaˈmjɔnna] is a village in the administrative district of Gmina Trzciana, within Bochnia County, Lesser Poland Voivodeship, in southern Poland.

In the course of the Josephine colonization Catholic and Lutheran Germans settled here in 1785.
