= Gmina Laskowa =

Gmina Laskowa Laskowa Commune
- Gmina
- Flag Coat of arms
- Interactive map of Gmina Laskowa
- Coordinates (Laskowa): 49°45′46″N 20°27′8″E
- Country: Poland
- Voivodeship: Lesser Poland
- County: Limanowa
- Seat: Laskowa

Area
  - Total: 72.82 km^{2} (28.12 sq mi)

Population (2006)
  - Total: 7,410
  - Density: 102/km^{2} (264/sq mi)
- Website: http://www.laskowa.iap.pl/

Gmina Laskowa is a rural gmina (administrative district) in Limanowa County, Lesser Poland Voivodeship, in southern Poland. Its seat is the village of Laskowa, which lies approximately 8 kilometres (5 mi) north of Limanowa and 50 km (31 mi) south-east of the regional capital Kraków.

The gmina covers an area of 72.82 square kilometres (28.1 sq mi), and as of 2006 its total population is 7,410.

== Villages ==
Gmina Laskowa contains the villages and settlements of Jaworzna, Kamionka Mała, Kobyłczyna, Krosna, Laskowa, Sechna, Strzeszyce, Ujanowice and Żmiąca.

== Neighbouring gminas ==
Gmina Laskowa is bordered by the gminas of Iwkowa, Limanowa, Lipnica Murowana, Łososina Dolna and Żegocina.
