= Strzeszyce =

- Village
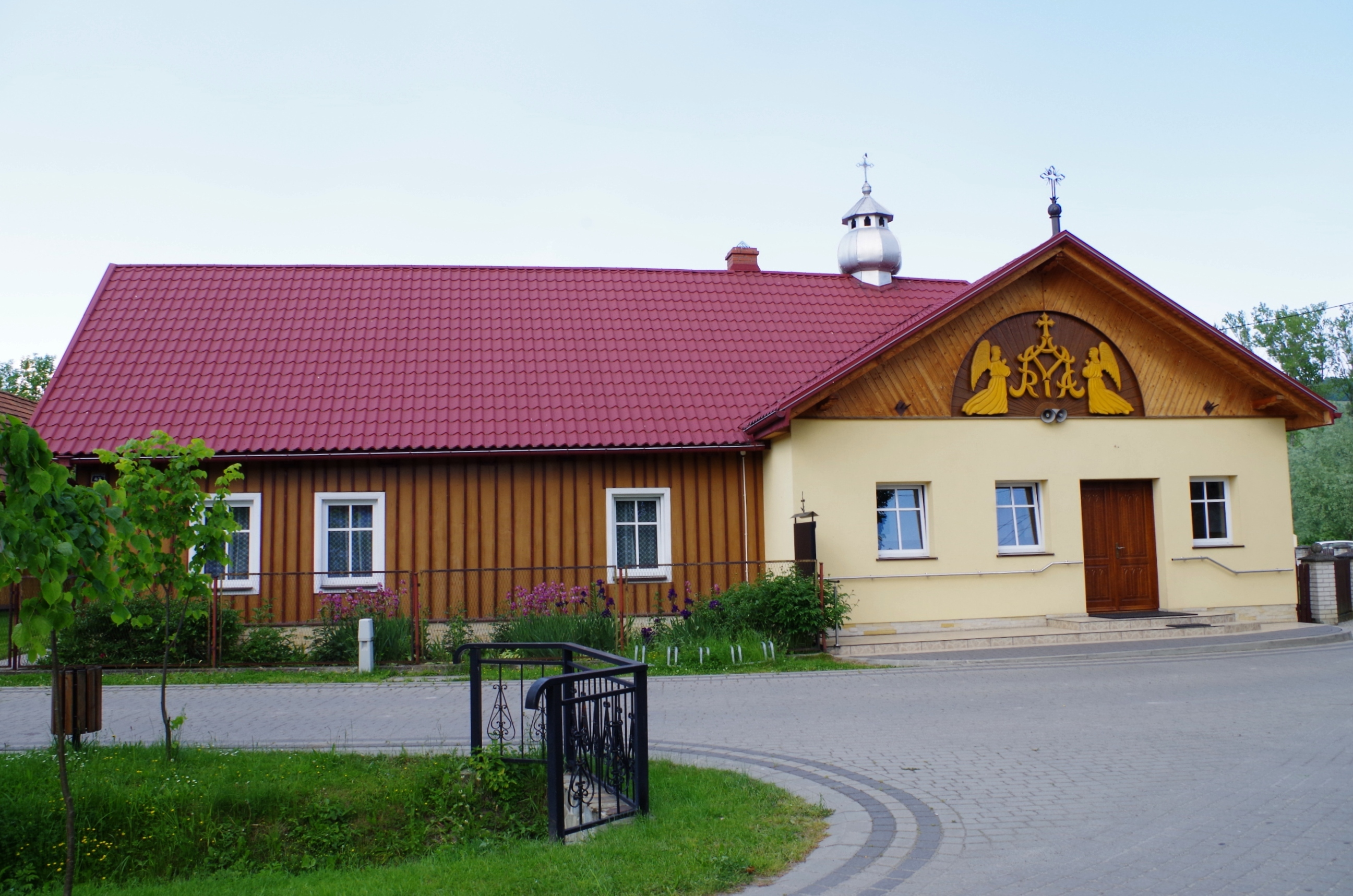
- Chapel in the village

- Location within Poland
- Coordinates: 49°46′N 20°32′E
- Country: Poland
- Voivodeship: Lesser Poland
- County: Limanowa
- Gmina: Laskowa

Strzeszyce [stʂɛˈʂɨt͡sɛ] is a village in the administrative district of Gmina Laskowa, within Limanowa County, Lesser Poland Voivodeship, in southern Poland.
