= Rdzawa =

- Village
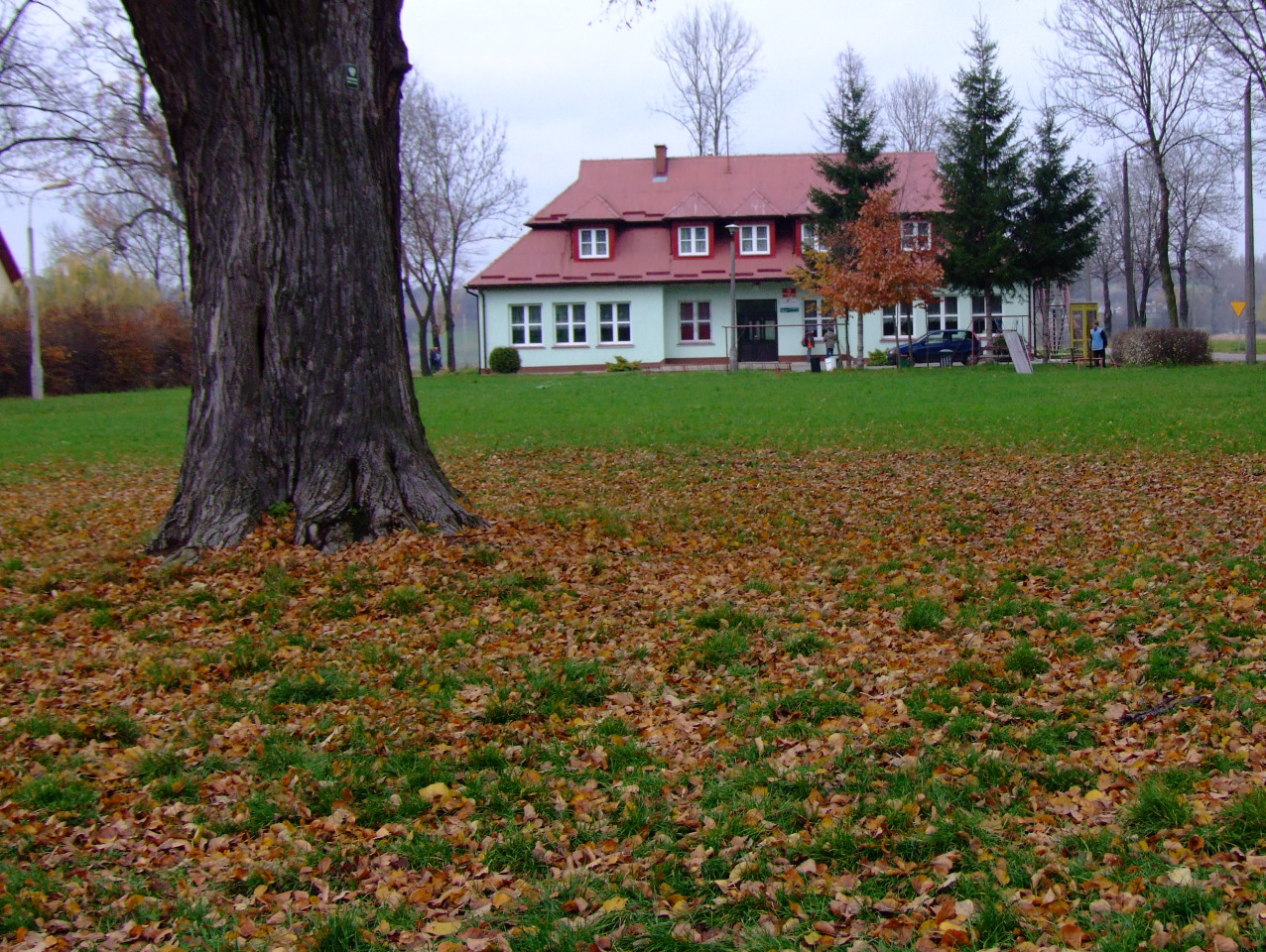

- Location within Poland
- Coordinates: 49°49′31″N 20°20′42″E
- Country: Poland
- Voivodeship: Lesser Poland
- County: Bochnia
- Gmina: Trzciana
- Population: 230

Rdzawa [ˈrd͡zava] is a village in the administrative district of Gmina Trzciana, within Bochnia County, Lesser Poland Voivodeship, in southern Poland.
