= Ujanowice =

- Village
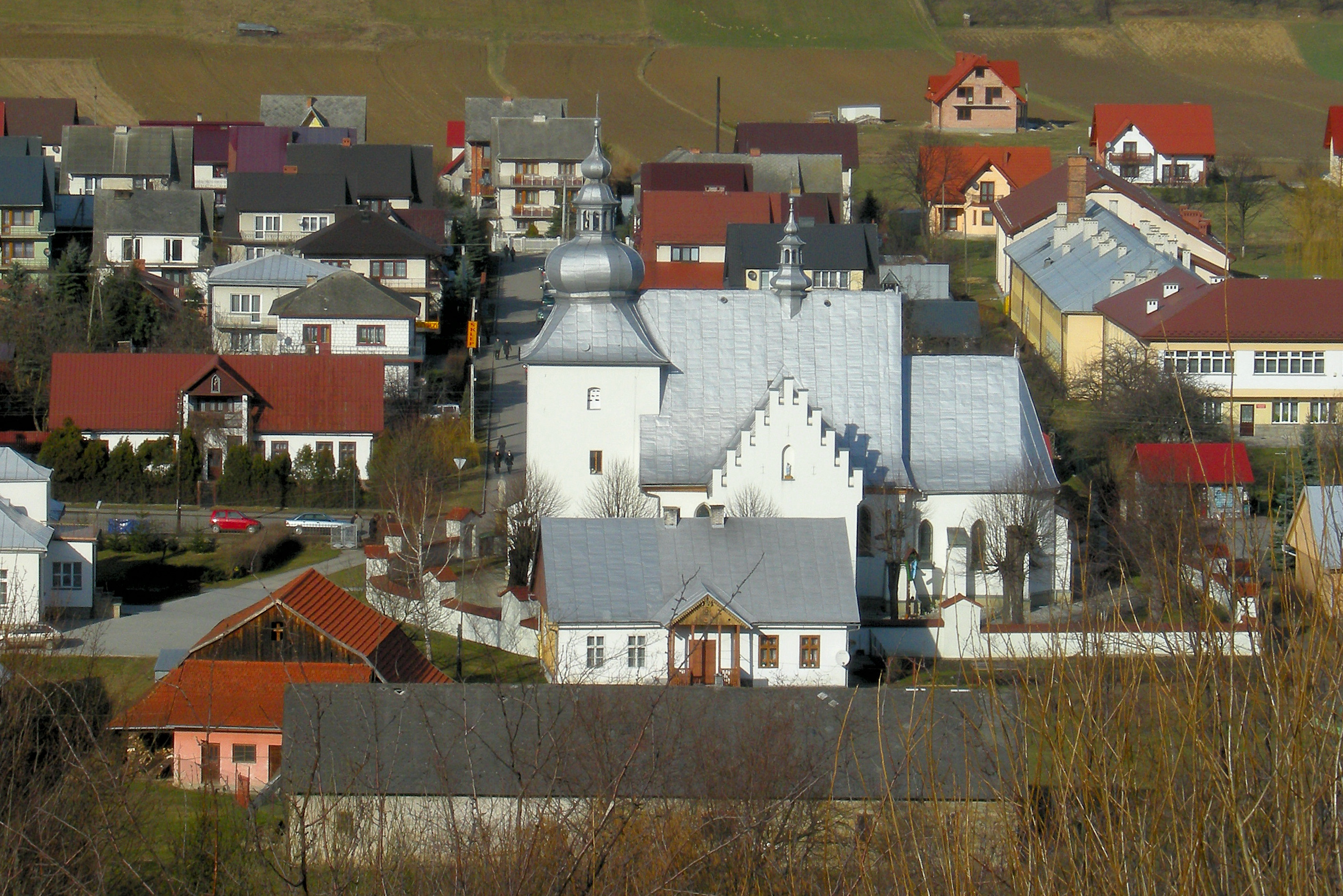
- Ujanowice with the Church of Saint Archangel Michael

- Location within Poland
- Coordinates: 49°44′45″N 20°33′35″E
- Country: Poland
- Voivodeship: Lesser Poland
- County: Limanowa
- Gmina: Laskowa
- Highest elevation: 280 m (920 ft)
- Lowest elevation: 250 m (820 ft)

Population
  - Total: 460

Ujanowice [ujanɔˈvit͡sɛ] is a village in the administrative district of Gmina Laskowa, within Limanowa County, Lesser Poland Voivodeship, in southern Poland.
