= Krosna, Poland =

Krosna
- Village
- Location within Poland
- Coordinates: 49°47′N 20°32′E
- Country: Poland
- Voivodeship: Lesser Poland
- County: Limanowa
- Gmina: Laskowa
- Time zone: UTC+1 (Central European Time)
  - Summer (DST): UTC+2 (Central European Summer Time)
- ISO 3166 code: POL

Krosna [ˈkrɔsna] is a village in the administrative district of Gmina Laskowa, within Limanowa County, Lesser Poland Voivodeship, in southern Poland.
