= Wierzbięta =

Wierzbięta or Wirzbięta is a Polish-language name and surname derived as a diminutive of the name Wierzba. Notable people with this surname include: Notable people with this name or surname include:

- Maciej Wirzbięta (alternatively Wierzbięta; (b. 1523 Kraków, d. June 1605) – Polish printer, translator and bookseller
- Wierzbięta z Ruszczy, a Voivode of Kraków
- Wierzbięta Krotoski, founder of Krotoszyn
- Wierzbięta z Paniewic, owner of Kępno
- Bartosz Wierzbięta (born 1974), Polish musician, dubbing director and translator
