= Leszczyna, Lesser Poland Voivodeship =

Leszczyna
- Village
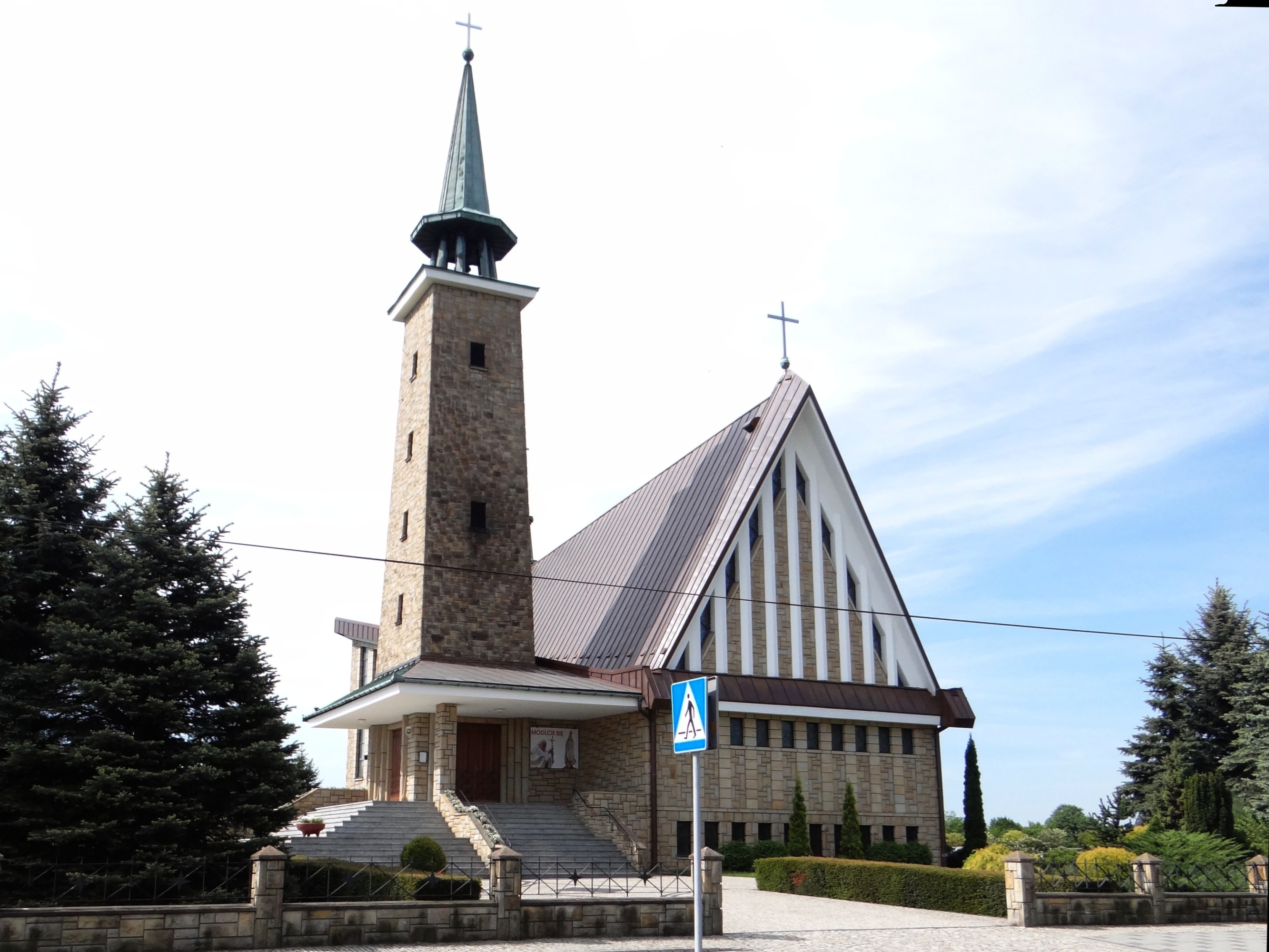
- Local Catholic church

- Location within Poland
- Coordinates: 49°51′35″N 20°23′41″E
- Country: Poland
- Voivodeship: Lesser Poland
- County: Bochnia
- Gmina: Trzciana
- Population: 760

Leszczyna [lɛʂˈt͡ʂɨna] is a village in the administrative district of Gmina Trzciana, within Bochnia County, Lesser Poland Voivodeship, in southern Poland.
